= George Vari Engineering and Computing Centre =

Building at Toronto Metropolitan University, Canada

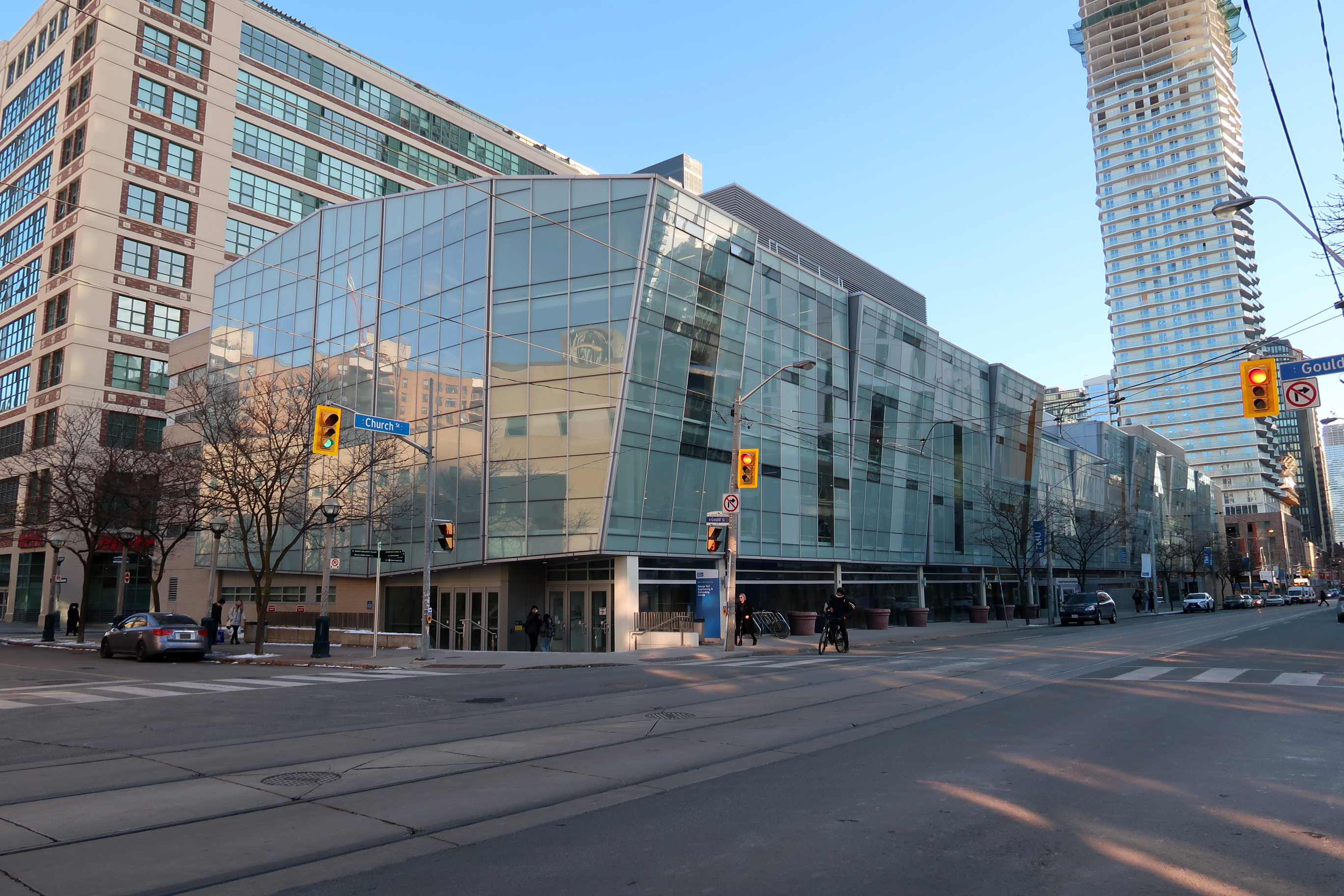
- A view of the George Vari Engineering and Computing Centre
- Interactive map of the George Vari Engineering and Computing Centre area

General information
- Location: Toronto, Ontario, 245 Church St.
- Coordinates: 43.6577°N 79.3773°W
- Completed: 2004
- Inaugurated: 2005
- Cost: $45 million
- Owner: Faculty of Engineering, Architectural Science, Toronto Metropolitan University

Technical details
- Floor count: 4

Design and construction
- Architecture firm: Moriyama & Teshima Architects

The George Vari Engineering and Computing Centre is a 4-story building that is part of Toronto Metropolitan University in Toronto, Ontario, Canada.

Initially, in 2000, Santiago Calatrava proposed that the engineering building be 33 floors. The cost was $90 million and $25 million over the university's budget.

Completed in 2004 by Moriyama & Teshima Architects, the state-of-the-art building cost $45 million to complete.

The building houses the Faculty of Engineering and Architectural Science Dean's Office, the First Year Engineering Office and the offices for the Departments of Aerospace Engineering; Electrical, Computer, and Biomedical Engineering; Computer Science; and Mathematics.

The building was officially renamed in 2005 as the George Vari Centre for Computing and Engineering after a gift from George and Helen Vari.
