= George Vari =

Canadian businessman

The Honourable George William Vari PC CM
- Born: August 14, 1923; Szepes County, Hungary
- Died: December 9, 2010 (aged 87); Toronto, Ontario, Canada
- Occupation: Real estate developer
- Spouse: Helen de Fabinyi (m. 1967)

George William Vari, PC CM (August 14, 1923 – December 9, 2010) was a Canadian real estate developer and philanthropist. Trained as a civil engineer and economist in Hungary, he immigrated to Canada after the 1956 Hungarian Revolution.

== Life and career ==
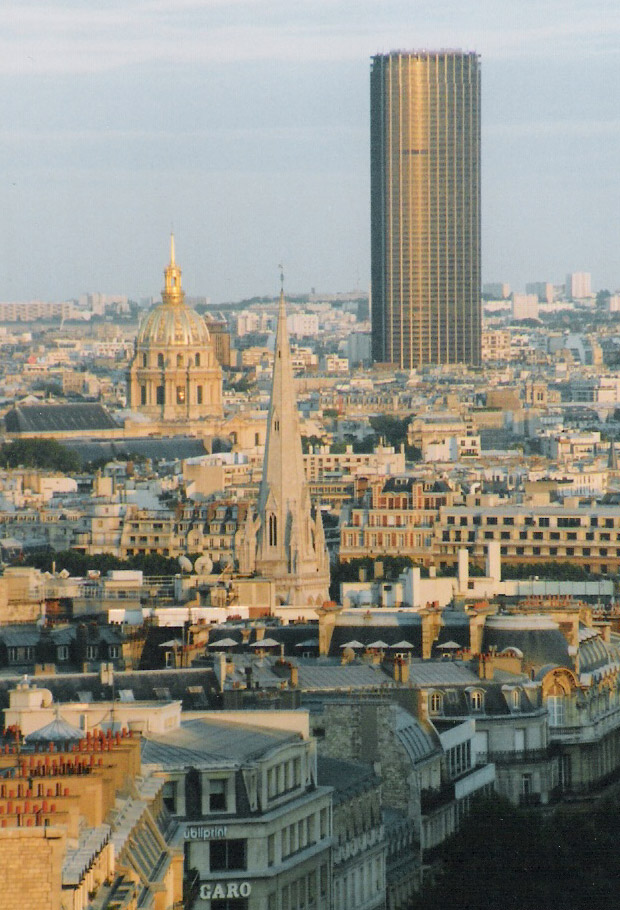
Tour Montparnasse, Paris

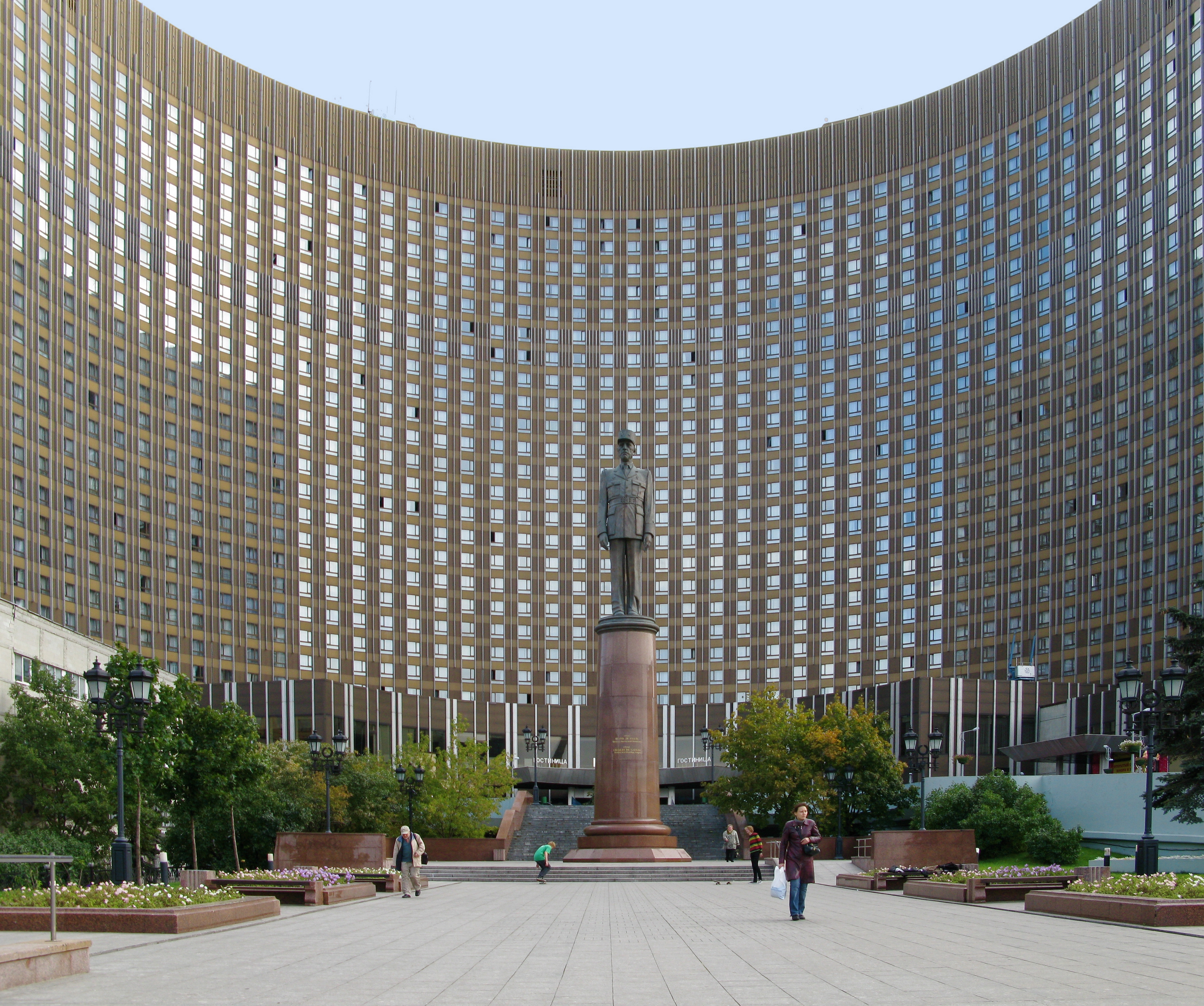
Cosmos Hotel, Moscow

George Vari was born in Szepes County, Hungary, to lawyer Istvan Vari and Ida Vari in 1923. During World War II, Vari was able to flee to Switzerland in 1940, and he studied in Lausanne. After the war, he returned to Hungary and attended the University of Szeged and Budapest Technical University.

Following the 1956 Hungarian Revolution, Vari left Hungary in 1957 and settled in Montreal. Vari had met Helen de Fabinyi in Hungary in 1950, and they were later married in Montreal in 1967.

Vari made his fortune in international real estate development, which included building the Tour Montparnasse in Paris, six of the pavilions at Expo 1967 in Montreal, and the Cosmos Hotel in Moscow.

He was renowned for his outstanding record in philanthropy, particularly in the field of educational institutions, making significant endowments to Nipissing University, Toronto Metropolitan University, York University and the University of Toronto. York's Vari Hall is named after him, as are various scholarships and awards at these institutions.

Toronto Metropolitan University renamed its Centre for Computing and Engineering (completed in 2004) to the George Vari Engineering and Computing Centre, following a $5 million donation in 2005. Vari and his wife operated the "George and Helen Vari Foundation" as a vehicle for much of their charitable works in Canada and internationally.

In 1992, Vari was named to the Security Intelligence Review Committee. As a result, he became a member of the Queen's Privy Council for Canada and was entitled to be styled as "The Honourable George Vari" for life. He was made a Member of the Order of Canada in 1989. In addition, both he and his wife were appointed to France's Legion of Honour.

== See also ==
- Hungarian Canadians
- List of Legion of Honour recipients by name (V)
- List of foreign recipients of the Legion of Honour by country
- Legion of Honour Museum
