= O'Keefe House =

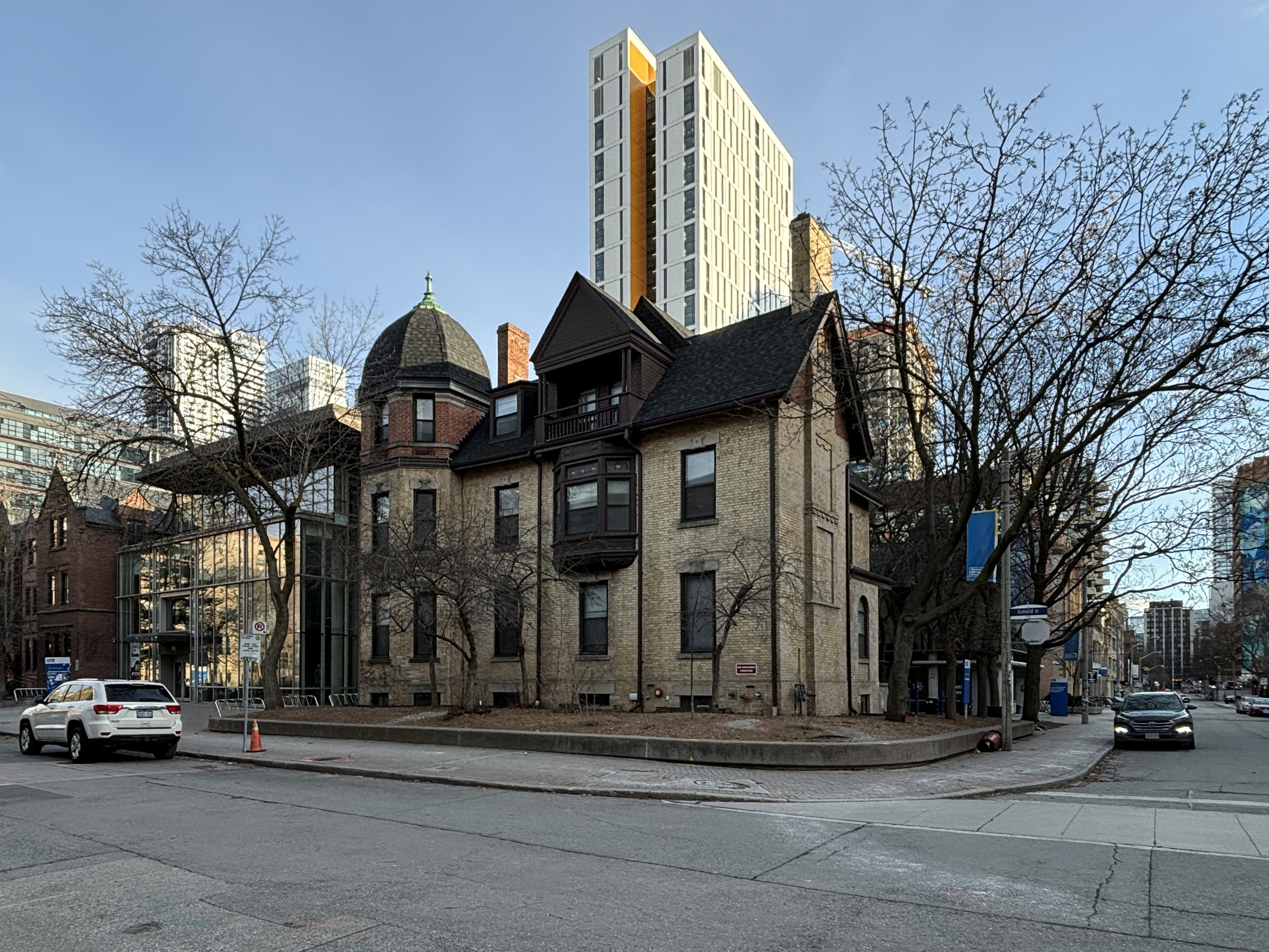
- O'Keefe House in 2024

General information
- Type: Residential
- Architectural style: Victorian
- Location: 137 Bond Street, Toronto, Ontario, M5B 1Y2
- Coordinates: 43°39′28″N 79°22′43″W
- Named for: Eugene O'Keefe
- Completed: 1855
- Renovated: 1889 (third storey addition)
- Owner: Toronto Metropolitan University

Technical details
- Floor count: Three

O'Keefe House is the former mansion of businessman Eugene O'Keefe, which served as a residence for Ryerson University (now Toronto Metropolitan University). It is located at 137 Bond Street in Toronto, Ontario, Canada. The building was a student residence from 1964 to 2018, and had 33 residents on three floors.

== History ==
The land at what is today 137 Bond Street was sold to a dry goods importer by the name of William Mathers on April 14, 1855. Along with the land, Mathers received the not yet completed, golden-bricked house. The building would host its most prominent proprietor in 1879 when it was purchased by Eugene O'Keefe. He was attracted to the house at the corner of Bond and Gould because he could keep tabs on his neighbouring brewery and reside within a block of St. Michael's Cathedral. To accommodate his growing family, O'Keefe had the third floor added in 1889. O'Keefe lived at 137 Bond Street until his death on the night of September 30, 1913, in his second-floor bedroom.

The house eventually was purchased by Longman's Publishing and converted to administrative space. The layout that can be found today can trace its origin to these offices. The Canadian Congress of Labour, the United Mine Workers and the Canadian Railroad Employees all utilized the Bond Street building at one point or another.

On March 6, 1963, S.E. Lyons and Son Realty Limited sent a letter to Ryerson principal Howard H. Kerr offering the premises at Bond and Gould for $85,000. Kerr struck a deal at $80,000, a stark contrast from its $6,000 value in 1880 or the $677,000 price-tag for a summer 2004 renovation. In time for the fall semester of 1964, Ryerson opened “The Bond Street Annex” along with other new residencies on Church Street and Oakham House, then known as Kerr Hall. Time saw the demolition of the Church Street residencies, and Oakham House was shut down as a residence for lack of fire code compliance. From 1963 through to the construction of Pitman Hall in 1991, O’Keefe was Ryerson's only official residence space. 2013 marked the 50th anniversary of O'Keefe House as a Ryerson residence.

In 2018, with the opening of the new HOEM residence on Jarvis Street, Ryerson announced that the building would no longer house students from the 2018-19 academic year. Instead, the building will be used by the university for non-residential purposes.

O'Keefe House under redevelopment in 2026

The building is currently being redeveloped into the new TMU Student Wellbeing Centre.
