= Oakham House =

Historical building in Toronto, Ontario, Canada

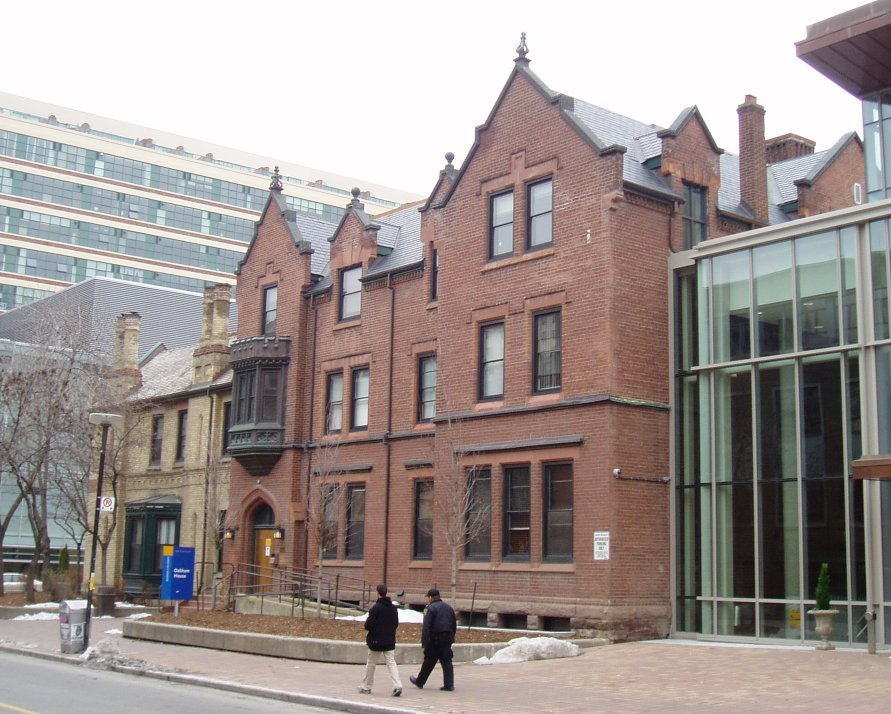
- Oakham House in 2006, as seen from Gould Street facing Church Street

General information
- Architectural style: Gothic revival
- Location: 322 Church Street, Toronto, Ontario, Canada
- Coordinates: 43°39′28.5″N 79°22′41″W
- Completed: 1848
- Renovated: 1900, 1978
- Owner: Toronto Metropolitan University

Design and construction
- Architects: William Thomas; D.B. Dick

Ontario Heritage Act
- Designated: August 14, 1978

Oakham House is a Gothic Revival style brick house at 322 Church Street, at the southwest corner with Gould Street, in the Garden District of Toronto, on the campus of Toronto Metropolitan University. It was built in 1848 as the private residence of its architect, William Thomas.

Originally the residence of Thomas, it was the residence of the McGee family following Thomas' death in 1860. The building was sold to the City of Toronto in 1898, and until 1958 the building housed a working boys' home, sheltering boys aged 14‍–‍18. In 1958, the building was sold to the Ontario government, who subsequently granted the building to the Ryerson Institute of Technology (now Toronto Metropolitan University). The institute initially used the building as a dormitory until 1978, after which it became a dedicated student centre.

== History ==
Oakham House opened in 1848 as a private residence and office for William Thomas. Thomas remained in this house until his death in 1860. Shortly before his death, he sold the house to John McGee, relative of D'Arcy McGee, for $2,000. The house remained with the McGee family until 1898, when the City of Toronto purchased the house for $8,000.

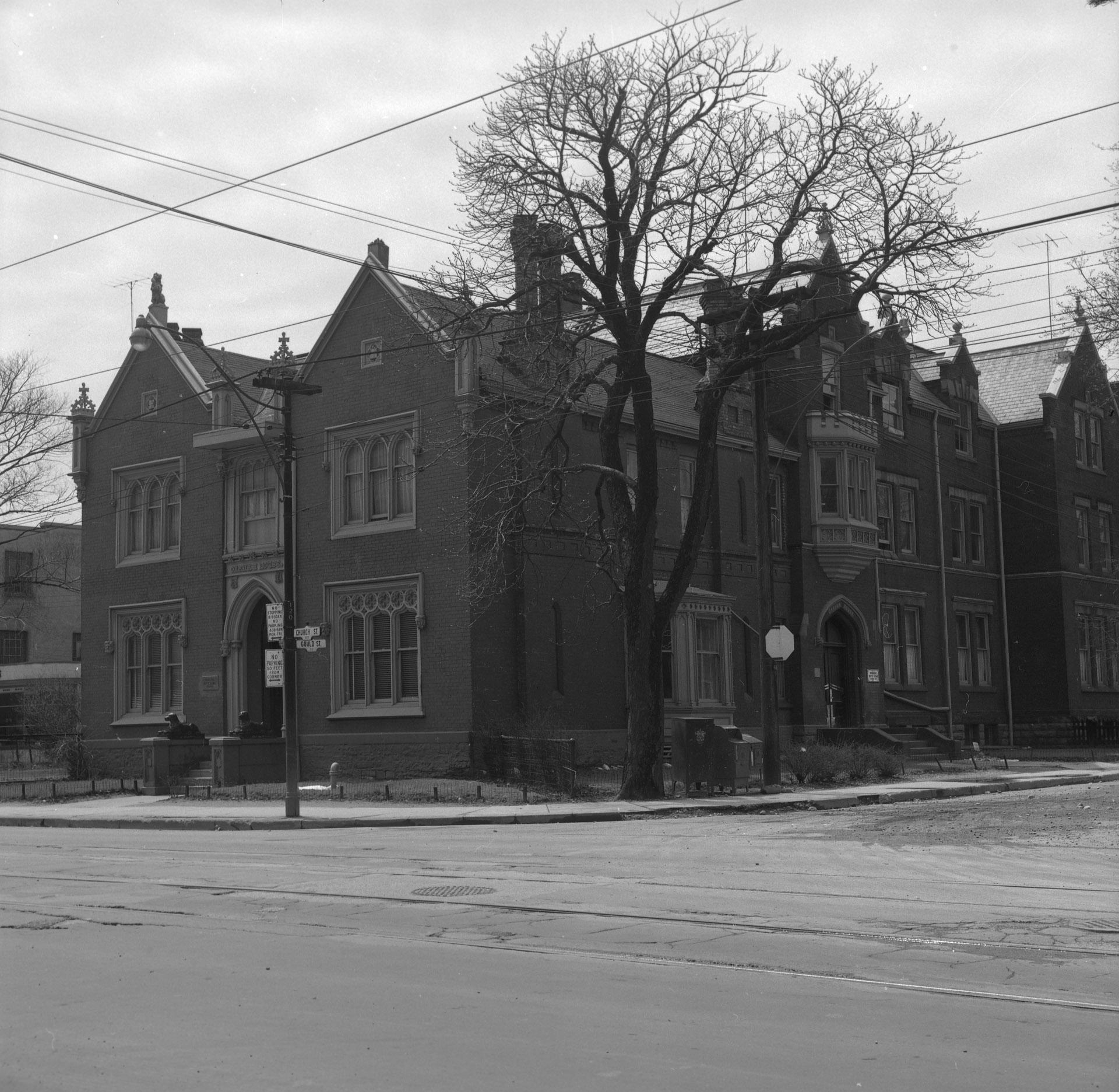
Oakham House as seen from the intersection of Church St. and Gould St. facing southwest (c. 1956)

While under the ownership of the City of Toronto, a working boys' home moved from a location on Frederick Street to Oakham House, housing about 50 boys aged 14‍–‍18. To accommodate the larger number of people, an addition to the house was added in 1900, designed by D.B. Dick, replacing the wing that Thomas' office was in. The house was also home to a football team that played for the Boys' Union Football League. The boys would be boarded in the house for free until they could find a job, at which point they would start paying a weekly sum to remain housed there.

In October 1958, the Ontario government bought the house from the city, and subsequently gave it to the nearby Ryerson Institute of Technology. The house was renamed to Kerr Hall, after the principal of the institute Howard Hillen Kerr. The house was renovated to serve as a dormitory for students attending the institute. The boys' home that stood there relocated, and was renamed to Clifton House. The renovated Kerr Hall opened in 1960, with 42 male dorms on the upper floors of the building. The basement was home to the Students' Administrative Council (now Toronto Metropolitan Students' Union), as well as a conference room. In the 1960s, another Kerr Hall was under construction around the old Ryerson Hall, and so in 1969, the house was renovated and renamed to Eric Palin Hall. The renovated hall opened in 1971, and continued to serve as a dormitory until 1973, when the fire department deemed the upper floors unsafe.

The building was renovated once again starting in 1976, and in 1978 reopened, this time under its original name of Oakham House, as a student centre, featuring a pub on the lower levels. The students' union took over daily management of the building in July 1996. The house was incorporated into the new Student Campus Centre in 2005, and in 2021, the building was renovated again, this time to expand the kitchen and dining area at the café operating in the building.

== Architecture ==
Oakham House was constructed with yellow-brick masonry on a stone foundation and topped with a slate roof. Pinnacles ornament the roofline, with two on each side of Oakham House's two front gables. The house exhibits many other Gothic elements such as the various carved-stone head sculptures on its facade. The carved-stone heads with garlands on their brows can also be seen at the base of the pinnacles. There are ten stone heads on the facade of the house. The addition made in 1900 by D.B. Dick is both larger and taller than the original house, but was still constructed in the same style. The addition used liver coloured bricks instead of the yellow ones on the original, however this was concealed with a coat of paint. The removal of the paint later on ended up damaging the masonry of the building.

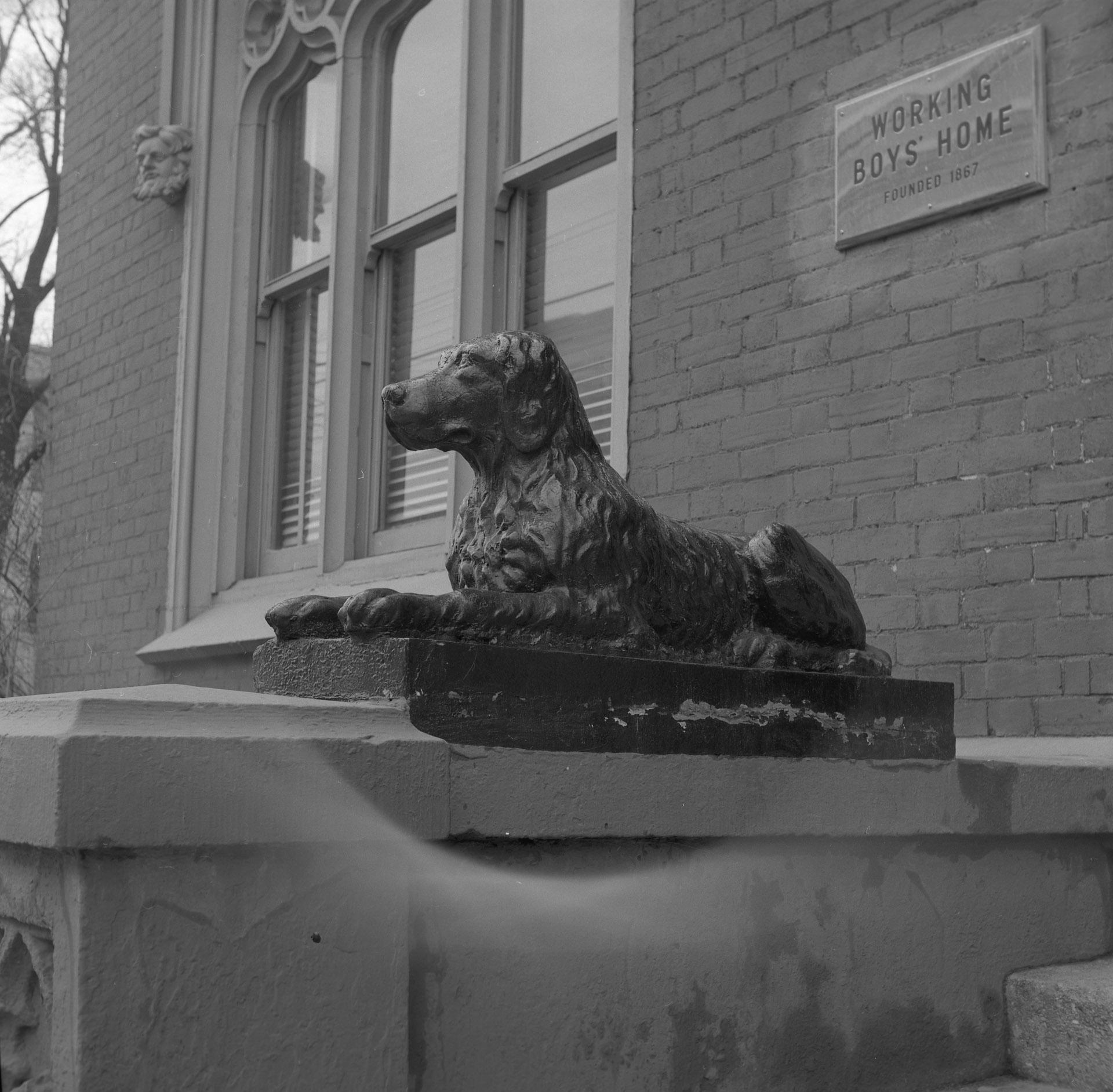
One of the iron dogs outside of Oakham House (c. 1956)

The entrance on Church Street consists of a pointed arch by multiple mouldings. This entrance is framed with engaged columns with figured capitals. A square with an ornate T is present on top of the front door and below the centre window. It has small shields on either side with heraldic devices and a coat of arms. The name of the building was carved in stone, and this sign was mounted above the front door. Two iron dogs facing each other, with iron rings in their mouths for hitching horses used to be present at the curb of the house. They were painted red in order to represent Chesapeake Bay Retrievers. Later on, the dogs were removed from the curb and mounted on the front entrance near the steps and were repainted black. The dogs have since been relocated to the TMU Library's Archives and Special Collections reading room.

== See also ==
- List of oldest buildings and structures in Toronto
