= Helen Vari =

Canadian philanthropist (1931–2023)

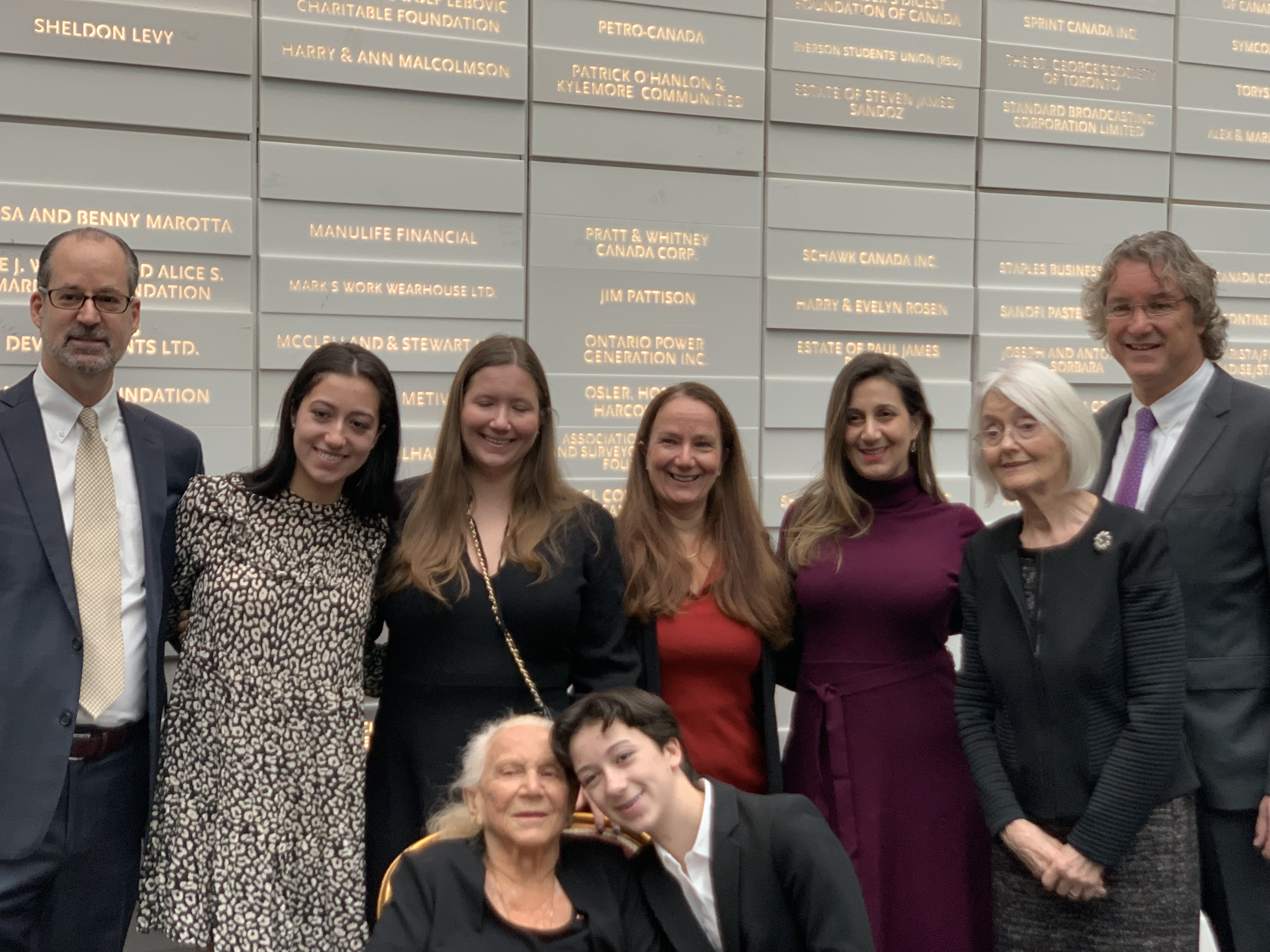
Mrs Helen Vari at a ceremony in Toronto in December 2022

Helen Ilona Vari CM (née de Fabinyi; March 31, 1931 – March 16, 2023) was a Canadian philanthropist.

== Biography ==
Vari was born Helen Ilona de Fabinyi in Spišská Nová Ves on March 31, 1931, and was raised in Hungary. She was educated in Hungary and Austria. She met George Vari in 1950. She fled Hungary in 1957 following the Hungarian Revolution of 1956. She and George were married in Montreal in 1967.

In 1984, Vari and her husband founded the George and Helen Vari Foundation to promote education in Canada and cultural and educational exchange. The foundation gave philanthropic gifts to numerous educational institutions including the University of Toronto, York University, Toronto Metropolitan University and Ontario Tech University.

The Varis donated generously to the restoration of Les Invalides and donated thousands of Canadian maple trees to the Palace of Versailles to replace those destroyed in a storm.

On November 19, 2015, Vari was made a Member of the Order of Canada, she was invested on February 12, 2016, at Rideau Hall by David Johnston, Governor General of Canada. She was also honoured with the French Legion of Honour and served as a patron of the foreign section of the Society of Members of the Legion of Honour.

She was honorary colonel of the Toronto Scottish Regiment (Queen Elizabeth The Queen Mother's Own).

In 2022, as honorary co-chair of the Vimy Foundation, Vari unveiled the Vari Gate in Vimy. She also financed a new visitor's centre at the Canadian National Vimy Memorial.

Vari died on March 16, 2023, at the age of 91.

== Honours ==
=== National honours ===
- February 6, 2002: Queen Elizabeth II Golden Jubilee Medal
- November 19, 2015: Member of the Order of Canada
- February 6, 2012: Queen Elizabeth II Diamond Jubilee Medal

=== Foreign honours ===
- France:
  - Ordre national de la Légion d'honneur:
    - 2012: Officer
    - 2018: Commander
    - 2022: Grand Officer
  - Ordre national du Mérite:
    - Officer

=== Honorary degrees ===
- 2003: York University, Doctor of Laws (LLD)
- 2011: Victoria University, University of Toronto, Doctor of Humane Letters (LHD)
- 2015: University of Ontario Institute of Technology, Doctor of Laws (LLD)
- 2017: Ryerson University, Doctor of Laws (LLD)
- 2019: St. Francis Xavier University
- 2022: Nipissing University, Doctor of Letters (DLitt)
