= South Bond Building =

Coordinates: 43.65685°N 79.37829°W

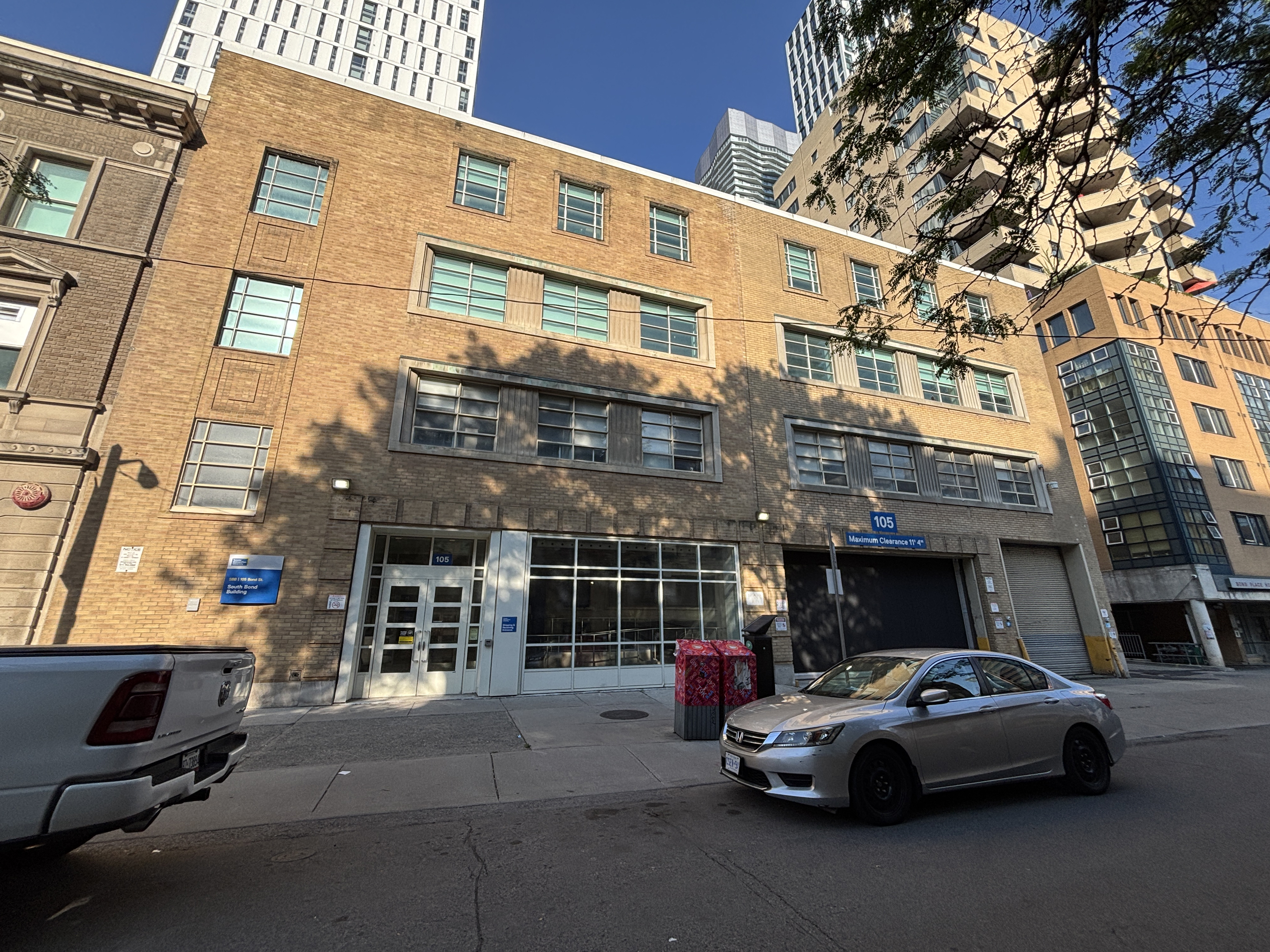
South Bond Building in 2025

The South Bond Building, or the former C.E. Goad Offices, is located at 105 Bond Street, Toronto, Ontario. It was built in 1912, and, starting in 1944, housed the Doubleday Canada publishing headquarters and was purchased by Ryerson University (now Toronto Metropolitan University) in 2006. After undergoing extensive renovations that kept the original facade, Ryerson opened the South Bond Building (building code SBB) in the fall of 2007. In 2009, it was the first university in Ontario to be awarded a LEED (Leadership in Energy and Environmental Design) Gold rating for energy efficiency.

The building is currently home to:

- School of Urban and Regional Planning (SURP) (3rd and 4th floors)
- Psychology Research & Training Centre (PRTC) (1st and 2nd floors)
- Toronto Metropolitan University Shipping and Receiving dock (1st floor)

The City of Toronto listed it as a municipal heritage property on July 2, 1974.
