= HitchBOT =

Either of two Canadian-made hitchhiking robots

hitchBOT
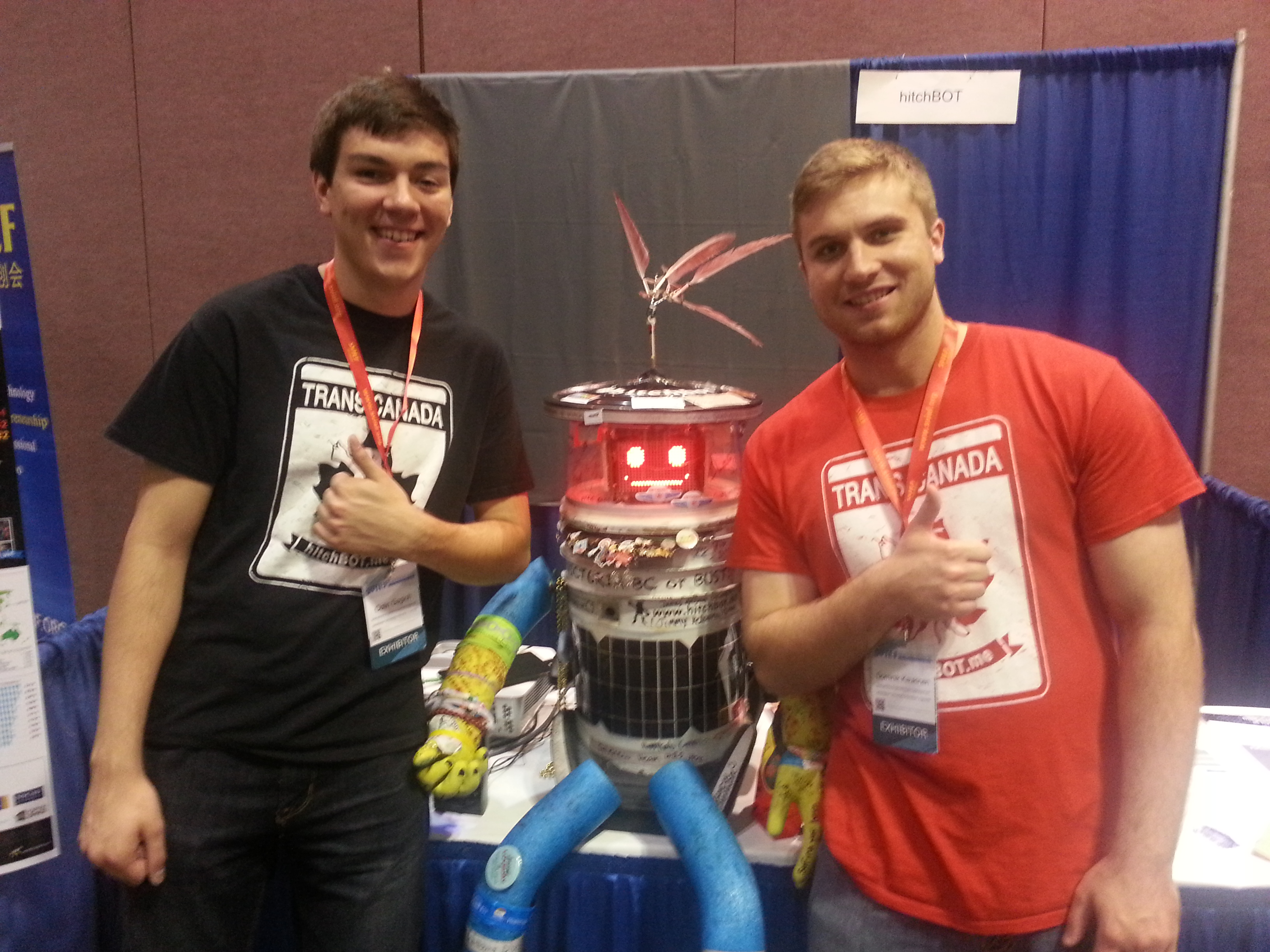
- hitchBOT (middle) displayed at an exhibition
- Inventor: David Harris Smith; Frauke Zeller
- Year of creation: 2013
- Type: Humanoid robot
- Purpose: Study social interaction with humans

hitchBOT was a Canadian hitchhiking robot created by professors David Harris Smith of McMaster University and Frauke Zeller of Ryerson University (now known as Toronto Metropolitan University) in 2013. It gained international attention for successfully hitchhiking across Canada, Germany and the Netherlands. In 2015, its attempt to hitchhike across the United States ended when it was stripped, dismembered, and decapitated in Philadelphia.

== Description ==
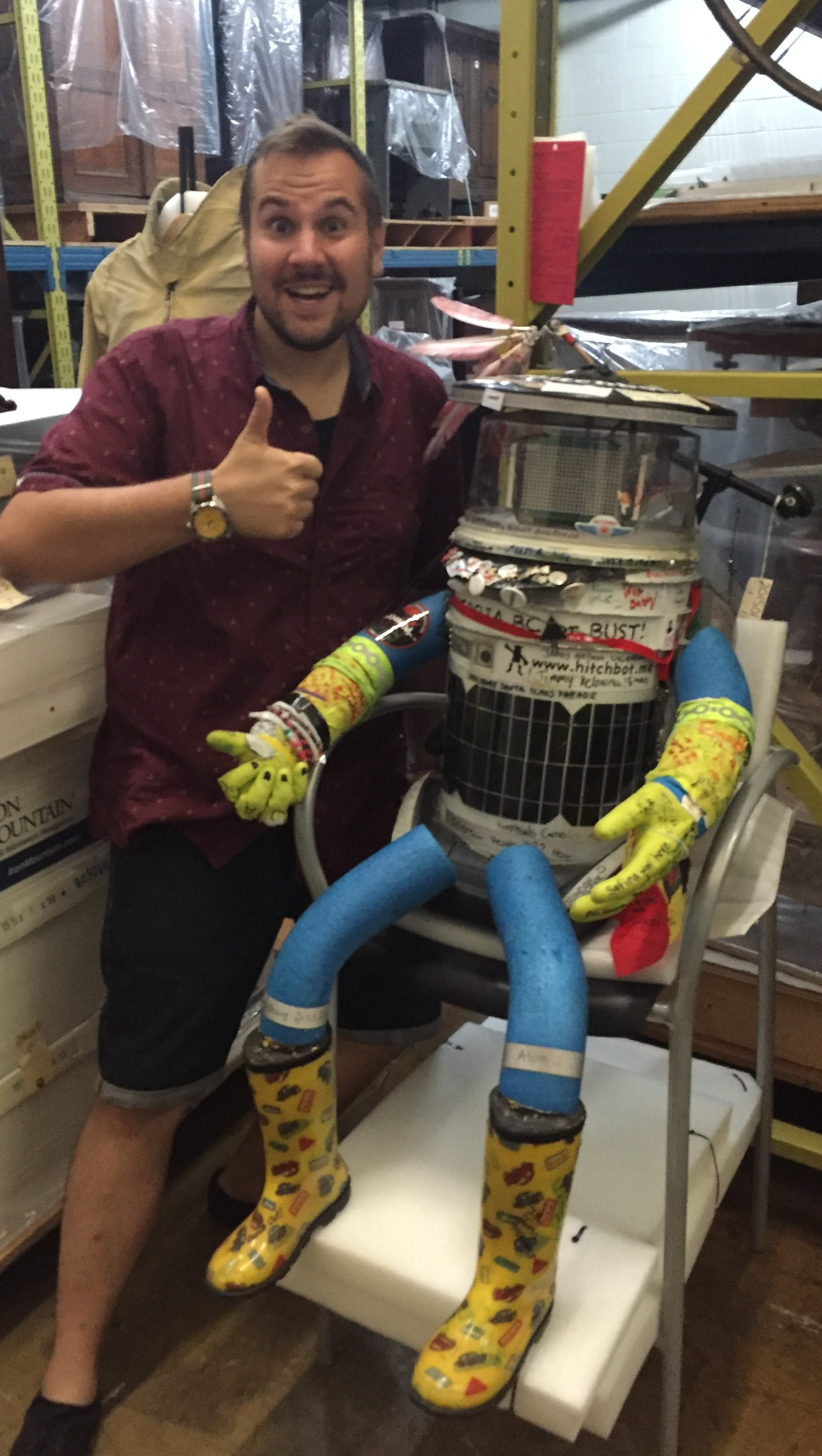
Original hitchBOT in collections

Smith, who had hitchhiked across Canada three times, and Zeller had "designed the robot to learn about how people interact with technology and ask the question, 'Can robots trust human beings?'" The robot could not walk – it completed its "hitchhiking" journeys by "asking" to be carried by those who picked it up. The robot could engage in basic conversations, discuss facts, and function as a robotic companion during travels in the vehicle of the driver who picked it up. As part of a social experiment, it was equipped with social media accounts on Twitter, Facebook, and Instagram.

The robot had a cylindrical body composed mainly of a plastic bucket, with two flexible "arms" and two flexible "legs" attached to the torso. The top section of the body was transparent, containing a screen which displayed eyes and a mouth, making the robot approximately humanoid in external appearance. It was small and had a look the team described as "yard-sale chic," to evoke trust and empathy, and had a child's car seat base to be easily and safely transportable. It was powered either by solar power or by automobile cigarette lighters. It had a GPS device and a 3G connection, which allowed researchers to track its location. It was equipped with a camera, which took photographs periodically to document its journeys.

== Travels ==
The press reported the robot's "hitchhiking" in many countries. From July 27, 2014, to August 21, 2014, it hitchhiked across Canada from the Institute for Applied Creativity at NSCAD University, Halifax, Nova Scotia, to Victoria, British Columbia. The robot spent a weekend with the Wiikwemkoong First Nation, it was given the name "biiaabkookwe" translating as "Iron Woman" from the Anishinaabe. The robot was so popular that its GPS had to be disabled sometimes to prevent crowds from bothering those who took it into their homes.

A second hitchBOT machine was made, and in February 2015, it hitchhiked around Germany for ten days. For three weeks in June 2015, it hitched around the Netherlands.

HitchBOT then attempted to cross the United States from Boston to San Francisco, starting July 17, 2015. After two weeks, on August 1, 2015, a photo was tweeted, showing that the robot had been stripped "beyond repair" and decapitated in Philadelphia. It was located by some people following its progress on its website. The head was never found. Frauke Zeller, co-creator of hitchBOT, said: "We can see on all our data that the tablet and battery and everything shut off at the same time, so it must have been when they vandalised the bot."

== Legacy ==
HitchBOT's story highlighted the issues of autonomous technology, the ethics of robot treatment, and the anthropomorphism of animate-like devices. The first hitchBOT became a permanent Canada Science and Technology Museum exhibit. The second damaged robot was rebuilt and is currently housed at the Heinz Nixdorf MuseumsForum in Paderborn, Germany. Smith and Zeller recreated their invention as hitchBOT 2.0 in 2019. The robot was sent to Paris, France, where it was touring about and appearing in a play, Killing Robots, by Linda Blanchet. That tour was put on hold indefinitely due to COVID-19.

== Similar robots ==
A similar hitch-hiking robot, TweenBOT, travelled in the late 2000s. Its purpose was also to study the interaction of humans with it. Zeller has also created an art critic robot called kulturBOT.
