= Toronto Metropolitan Students' Union =

Students' union at Toronto Metropolitan University

- Institution: Toronto Metropolitan University
- Location: Toronto, Ontario, Canada
- Established: June 27, 1967
- President: vacant
- Vice presidents: Education: vacant Equity: vacant Operations: vacant Student Life & Events: vacant
- Members: 45,000+
- Website: yourtmsu.ca

The Toronto Metropolitan Students' Union (TMSU; formerly known as the Ryerson Students' Union or RSU) is the current students' union that represents full-time undergraduate students at Toronto Metropolitan University, (known until 2022 as Ryerson University). All full-time students are required to be members and pay a levy. The money is used to fund student groups, events for students and campaigning.

== Board ==
The board of directors set the direction and the executive manage the day-to-day operations of the corporation. Students elect two to five members from each faculty, depending on the size of the faculty, to the board, in addition to having ex-officio student representatives from the university's senate, student groups, course unions and residence.

== Equity Service Centres ==
The TMSU has eight Equity Service Centres: The Centre for Women & Trans People, The Good Food Centre, BIPOC Students' Collective, Access TMU, The Queer Space, Centre for Safer Sex & Sexual Violence Support, SHIFT Centre and the Trans Collective. These centres serve as a space for students from different marginalized backgrounds to come together and organize equity and social justice initiatives, events, and campaigns.

In 2010, the board of directors voted to change the name from "Community Service Groups" to "Equity Service Centres".

== Controversy ==
The RSU has been extensively criticized for its equity centre policies and for banning a men's issues student group on campus. In 2015, former RSU vice-president education Jesse Root was accused of deleting emails in violation of Ontario's privacy laws.

== Ram Ganesh misuse of funds controversy ==
On January 24, 2019, photos of credit card statements belonging to RSU President Ramganesh Ragupathy (Ram Ganesh) were obtained and published on Facebook by university political group Rhinoceros Party. The statements alleged frivolous spending by Ganesh of over $250,000, including transactions for alcohol, a casino, various bars and nightclubs, hotel rooms, and at a sporting goods store.

In response to ongoing turmoil at the union involving both the above scandal and an inability to renegotiate a new operating agreement, Toronto Metropolitan University terminated its 1986 operating agreement with the union and declared that it would no longer recognize the union as the official student government for full-time undergraduate and graduate students on campus. The courts ordered an injunction preventing the university from severing the agreement.

== See also ==
- List of Ontario students' associations
