= Toronto Metropolitan University =

Public university in Ontario, Canada

- Coat of arms
- Former names: Ryerson Institute of Technology (1948–1966); Ryerson Polytechnical Institute (1966–1993); Ryerson Polytechnic University (1993–2001); Ryerson University (2001–2022)
- Motto: Mente et artificio (Latin)
- Motto in English: "With mind and skill"
- Type: Public university
- Established: September 16, 1948; 78 years ago (Note: The following date was when the institution was opened to the public.)
- Academic affiliations: COU; IAU; Universities Canada
- Endowment: C$133 million
- Chancellor: Donette Chin-Loy Chang
- President: Mohamed Lachemi
- Provost: Roberta Iannacito-Provenzano
- Undergraduates: 47,118
- Postgraduates: 2,941
- Location: Toronto, Ontario, Canada; 43°39′27.85″N 79°22′48.64″W
- Campus: Urban; 121 acres (49 ha)
- Other campus: Brampton
- Student newspapers: The Eyeopener; On The Record
Colours
Blue and gold
- Nickname: Bold
- Sporting affiliations: U Sports – OUA
- Mascot: Frankie the Falcon
- Website: torontomu.ca

Toronto Metropolitan University (TMU or Toronto Met), formerly known as Ryerson University, is a public research university located in Toronto, Ontario, Canada.

The university's core campus is situated within the Garden District in downtown Toronto, although it also operates facilities elsewhere in the city and a satellite campus in Brampton for its medical school. The university includes nine academic divisions: the Faculty of Arts, the Faculty of Community Services, the Faculty of Engineering and Architectural Science, the Faculty of Science, The Creative School, the Lincoln Alexander School of Law, the Ted Rogers School of Management, the School of Medicine, and the Yeates School of Graduate and Postdoctoral Studies. Many of these are further organized into smaller departments and schools. The university also provides continuing education services through the Chang School of Continuing Education.

The institution was established in 1948 as the Ryerson Institute of Technology, named after Egerton Ryerson, a prominent contributor to the design of the public school system and teachers' college in Canada West. In 1964, the institution was reorganized under provincial legislation and renamed Ryerson Polytechnical Institute. Under that name, it was granted limited degree-granting powers during the 1970s. The institution was reorganized into a full-fledged university in 1993 and renamed Ryerson Polytechnic University. In 2002, several years after the university's school of graduate studies was established, the university adopted the name Ryerson University. In 2022, it was renamed Toronto Metropolitan University, in response to concerns about Egerton Ryerson's influence on the Canadian Indian residential school system.

The university is a co-educational institution, with approximately 47,118 undergraduates and 2,950 graduate students enrolled there during the 2025–26 academic year. As of 2026, TMU has over 256,000 alumni. The university's athletics department operates several varsity teams that play as TMU Bold, competing in the Ontario University Athletics conference of U Sports.

== History ==
During the Second World War, Howard Hillen Kerr, the director of the Training and Re-Establishment Institute, along with other members of the Toronto Board of Education, saw a need for specialized institutes to provide educational and vocational training for specific jobs for returning veterans. After a trip to the Massachusetts Institute of Technology (MIT) in 1943, Kerr envisioned a similar institute in Canada spanning "the gap" between secondary education and universities. Kerr's effort led to the Vocational Education Act and the creation of vocational schools and technological institutes in Ontario. Although several institutes had been planned during the war, their establishment was delayed by the advent of the Cold War and the potential need to remobilize. However, with the prospect of another war diminished greatly by 1948, the decision was made to open the Ryerson Institute of Technology, with class calendars hastily issued in August 1948.

The school was named after Egerton Ryerson, who established the Toronto Normal School in 1847 on the future site of the Ryerson Institute of Technology. He also helped develop education in Canada West as the region's chief superintendent of education, creating a model for publicly funding the training of teachers and working on Canada West's Education Act, 1846. The site of the normal school eventually developed into several buildings used by the province's Department of Education and what became the Ontario Agricultural College, Royal Ontario Museum, OCAD University, and Ontario Institute for Studies in Education. Later, the grounds were used by the Royal Canadian Air Force as a training centre during the Second World War.

The Ryerson Institute of Technology was officially opened on September 16, 1948, with approximately 250 students enrolled. Kerr served as the institution's first principal until 1966, when he became the head of the Council of Regents for Colleges of Applied Arts and Technology. The initial aim for the institute to serve as a career training and vocational school was reflected by its early enrolment, with the majority of its early students being enrolled in continuing education part-time night school programs, as opposed to a full-year academic stream. Initially the institute only offered two-year career training and vocational programs; its program catalogue was later expanded to include three-year diplomas by the early 1950s. Kerr mandated that English, physical education, and history be mandated in the school's curriculum in 1952.

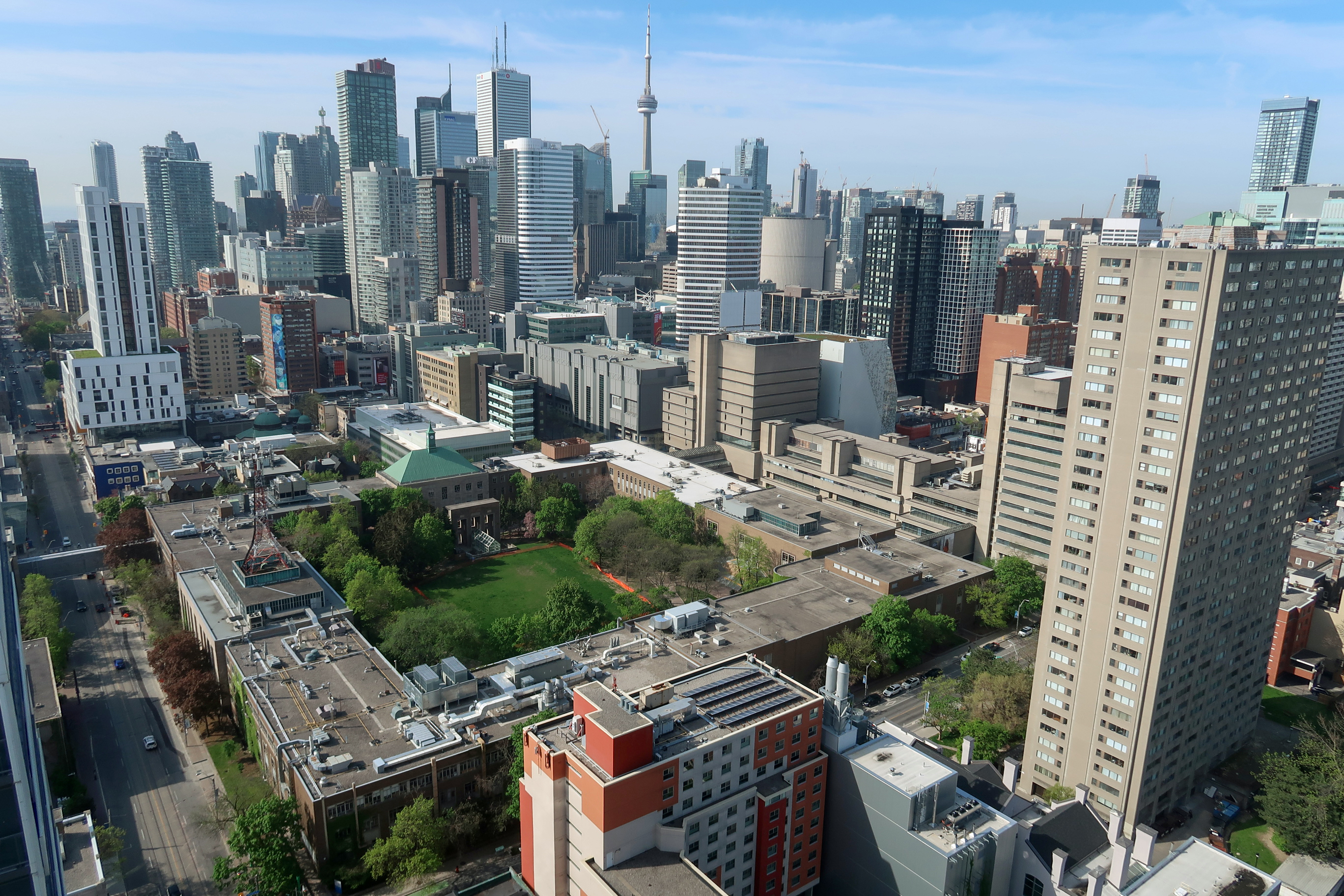
Aerial view Toronto Metropolitan University campus in Downtown Toronto in 2023

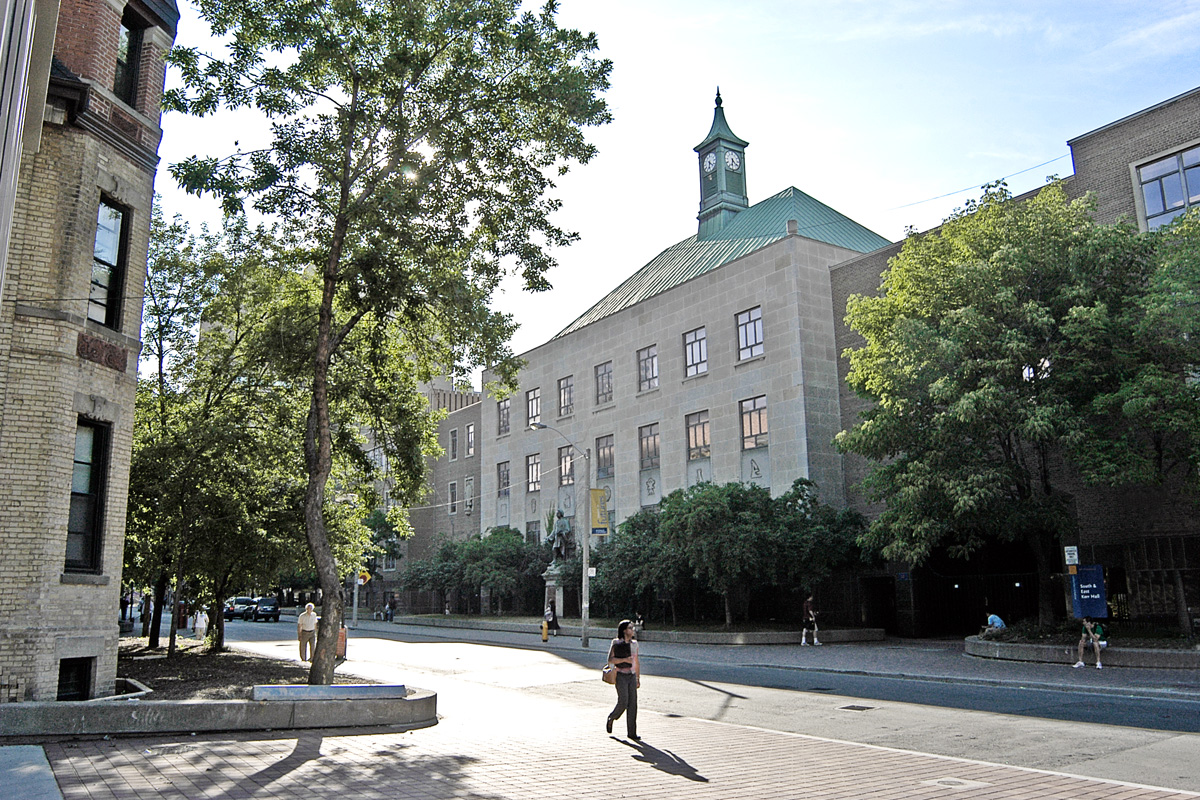
Exterior of Kerr Hall. Kerr Hall was completed in 1963 to accommodate the institution's growing student population.

Initially, plans were made to house the institute entirely within the Toronto Normal School building but the rapid growth of the student population made such plans impossible. Therefore, work on the first building built specifically for the institute began in 1958; Kerr Hall was completed in 1963. Several buildings had to be razed, including temporary barracks used during the Second World War and the Toronto Normal School (though its portico façade was kept). A number of other buildings were later built surrounding the courtyard.

The Ryerson Polytechnical Institute Act was passed by the provincial Parliament in 1963 to reorganize the institution. The institution was provided with its own board of governors and renamed Ryerson Polytechnical Institute in 1964. The nursing programs of three hospitals were transferred to the institution, the first one to be offered in a post-secondary institution in Canada. (Note: Prior to 1964, training for nurses in Canada typically occurred in a hospital setting.) In 1971, the institute received limited degree-granting authority: Bachelor of Applied Arts and Bachelor of Technology, then Bachelor of Business Administration in 1977.

In 1993, the institute became a full polytechnic university and renamed Ryerson Polytechnic University, expanding the mandate of the institution to include scholarly research. The school of graduate studies was formally established in 1997. In June 2002, the institution shortened its name to Ryerson University to reflect its new scope. The beginning of the 21st century saw another construction boom on its campus.

After the Truth and Reconciliation Commission of Canada released its report in May 2015, the university acted on several recommendations made out to post-secondary institutions in the report. As a result of Egerton Ryerson's association with the establishment of the Canadian Indian residential school system, the institution faced calls to reevaluate the namesake of the university in 2017. A consultation process to formulate the institution's response to the report was launched in 2018, led by faculty member Denise O'Neil Green. Green was later appointed the university's first vice-president for equity and community inclusion; the first vice-president position with this mandate in a Canadian post-secondary institution. In 2018, a plaque that describes Egerton Ryerson's role in the residential school system was placed next to the statue of him.

Pressure to rename the university grew after the finding of 215 (later revised to 200) possible unmarked graves at the Kamloops Indian Residential School in May 2021. Shortly after its discovery, staff and students of the university's Yellowhead Institute announced they would cease using the Ryerson name in favour of "X University" to advocate for a name change. In June 2021, the statue of Egerton Ryerson was toppled by activists and its severed head was thrown into Toronto Harbour. The university stated that the statue will not be restored or replaced. In August 2021, the university announced that it would accept the 22 recommendations of an internal task force, including the renaming of the university. On April 26, 2022, the university announced its renaming to Toronto Metropolitan University. The name change was formalized in December 2022 through an amendment to the institution's governing legislation.

On April 15, 2025, a motorist intentionally struck four pedestrians on the university's walkway, adjacent to Gould Street, leaving one with serious injuries.

== Campus ==
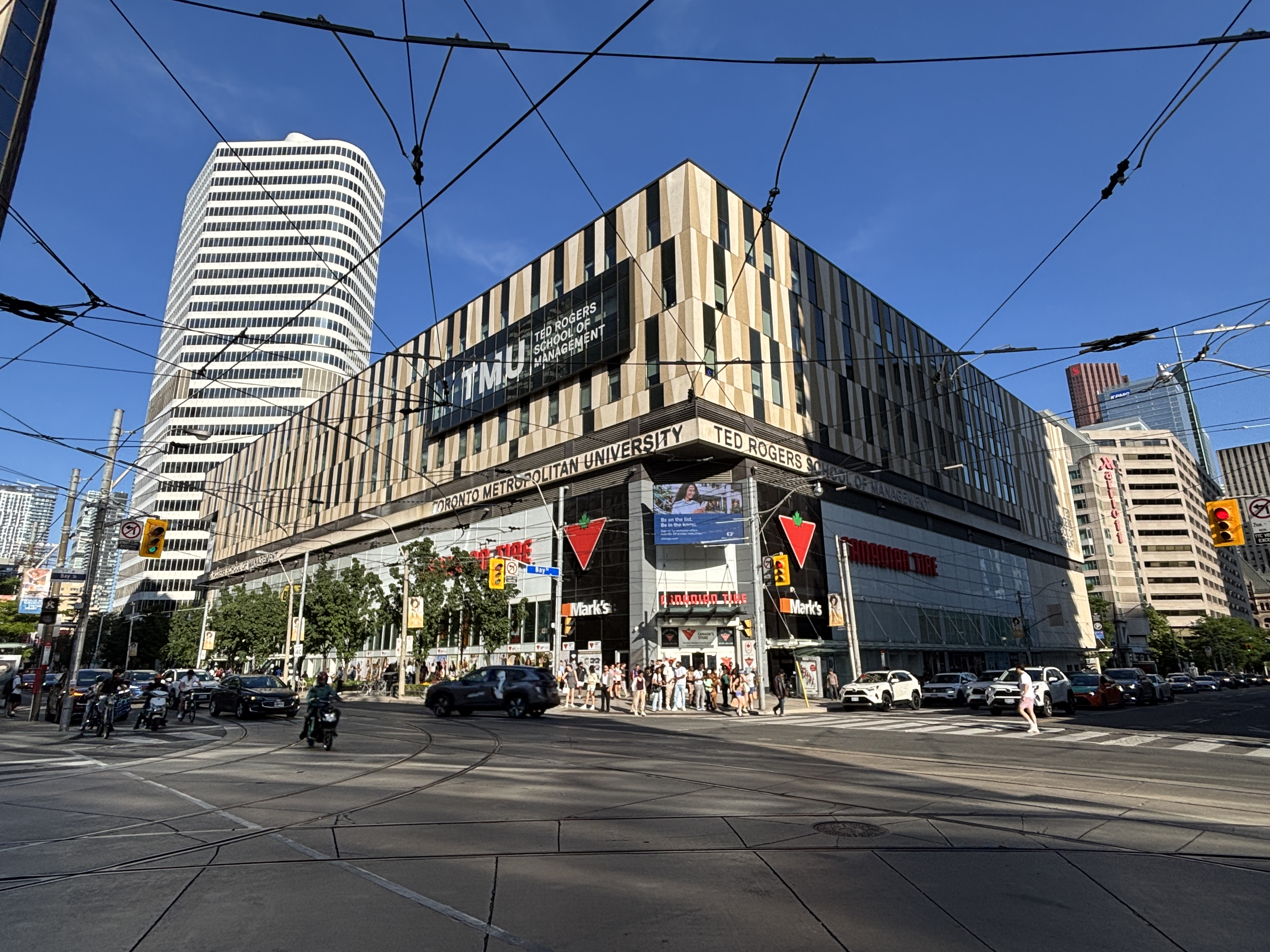
The Ted Rogers School of Management building is one of several facilities the university shares with other tenants

The university's central campus primarily lies within the Garden District of downtown Toronto. The campus is "interwoven" with the rest of the downtown core, with few entrance markers delineating the campus from the rest of the city. Most of the campus is designated as a mixed-use institutional area, although portions of the campus are situated in areas zoned for commercial and residential use. In addition to zoning by-laws, the height of the university's buildings is also limited by ordinances that protect the flight paths of air medical services to St. Michael's Hospital and the Hospital for Sick Children.

Gerrard Street to the north, Jarvis Street to the east, Dundas Street East to the south, and Yonge Street to the west, serve as the perimeter for the campus core; although the university also operates facilities beyond the core campus. Kerr Hall serves as the "campus heart," while Gould Street to the south of Kerr Hall serves as the university's main east–west corridor, connecting it with the other areas of the campus.. In May 2025, the (former) Dundas TTC station stop was approved to be renamed to TMU station and will be renamed December 7th.

Most of the streets and laneways throughout Toronto Metropolitan University's campus are considered a part of the public realm. These include connector streets open to vehicular traffic and pedestrian-only streets. Victoria Street south of Gerrard Street is designated as a pedestrian-only zone, having been closed to vehicular traffic since 1978. In 2010, a one-year pilot program was approved by the municipal government that limited Gould Street to pedestrian traffic only, an initiative that was later extended by six months. In February 2012, the city moved to permanently close Gould Street to car traffic, from O'Keefe Lane to Bond Street. The closed pedestrian-only portions of Gould Street is designated as Toronto Metropolitan University Square, and includes an outdoor skating rink in the winter.

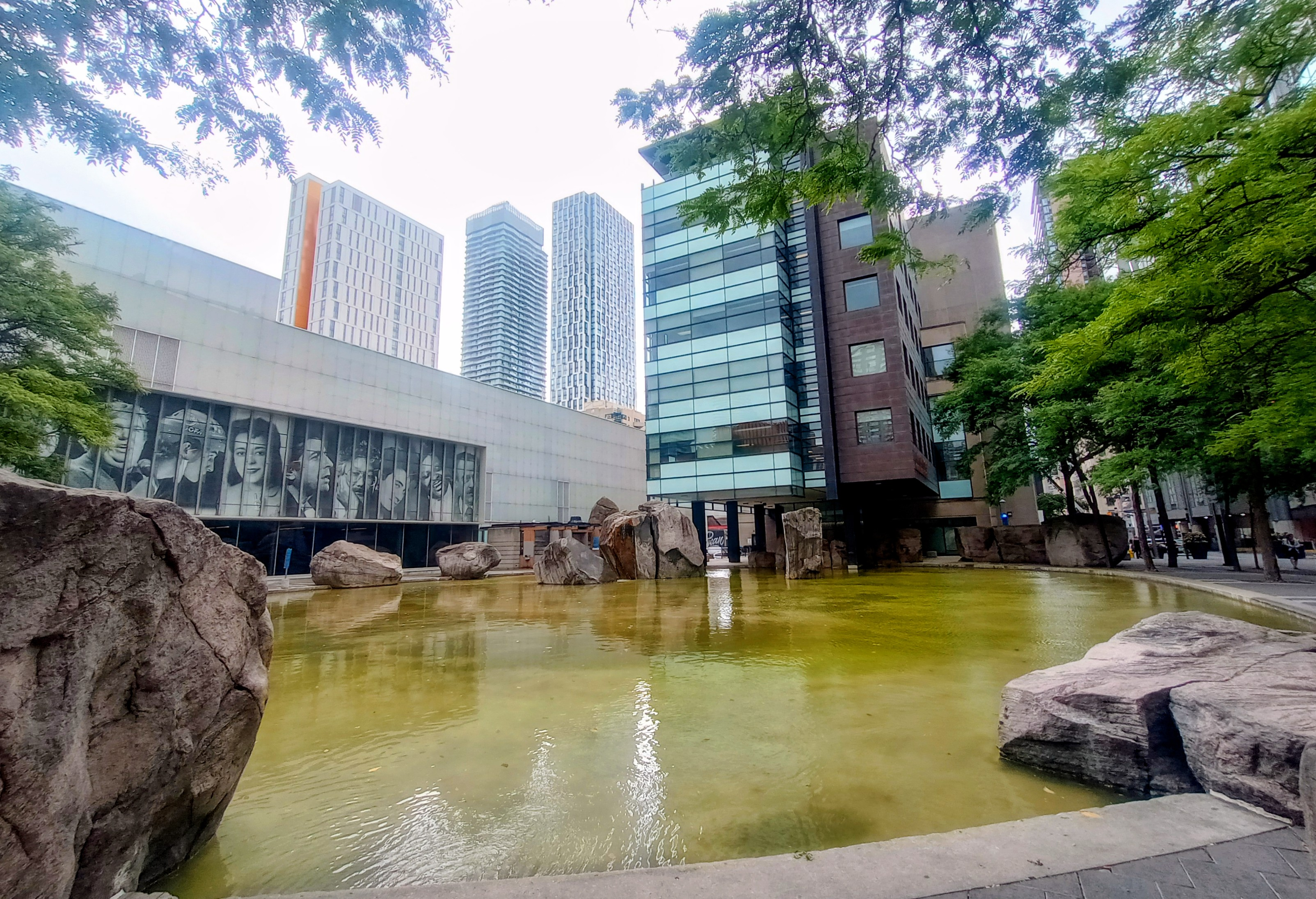
Devonian Square is a public space located within the campus. The Image Centre is pictured in the background.

Most of the parks, plazas, and green spaces on the university's campus are owned by the university, although access to these spaces is also open to the public. These spaces include Devonian Square, and Kerr Hall's quadrangle. Devonian Square was designed by Toronto Parks, Forestry and Recreation Division, and was partly funded by the Devonian Group of Charitable Foundations of Calgary—who also lent the park its name. The space features a reflecting pool, and large Precambrian igneous and metamorphic rocks that are approximately two billion years old from the Canadian Shield. In addition to green spaces, a green roof and urban farm, initially known as the Andrew and Valerie Pringle Environmental Green Roof, was built atop George Vari Engineering and Computing Centre in 2003. The urban farm operates on a five-year crop rotation, and contains 30 different crops and hundreds of cultivars.

Several undeveloped properties also exist on the campus, with the university having acquired two parking lots from Infrastructure Ontario in 2013 for $32 million; a 5,400-square-metre-lot (58,000 sq ft) at 202 Jarvis Street and a 750-square-metre-lot (8,100 sq ft) at 136 Dundas Street East. The university plans to continue to operate them as parking lots until enough capital is raised to develop the sites. In 2019, the university submitted a rezoning application for a 41-storey tower at 202 Jarvis Street, which will include an 11-storey academic base with classrooms, labs, and research space intended for the Faculty of Science, along with a student residence in its upper levels.

=== Buildings ===
The university operates more than 40 buildings. As of 2019, the university's buildings account for over 370,000 square metres (4,000,000 sq ft) of gross floor area. The campus includes an assortment of buildings from different architectural periods; Oakham House dating back to 1848, and the university's newest building, the Daphne Cockwell Health Sciences Complex, opened in 2019. Many of the earliest buildings built specifically for use by the university were designed during the mid-20th century in a Brutalist architectural-style. The university campus saw significant expansion during the early 21st century, with the university's total floor area nearly doubling in size from 2000 to 2019.

Several buildings operate as shared spaces between the university and other tenants. Along with university-owned properties, the university also leases or holds strata titles for a number of properties surrounding the central campus.

University-operated facilities
- 10 Dundas East (DSQ) (Note: The property as a whole is not owned by the university. The university either holds a strata title or a lease on the building/portion of the building.)
- 101 Gerrard Street East (COP)
- 111 Bond Street (BON)
- 111 Gerrard Street East (GER)
- 112–114 Bond Street (BND, PRO)
- 415 Yonge Street (YNG)
- Architecture Building (ARC)
- Atrium on Bay (AOG)
- Bell Trinity Square (BTS)
- Campus Store (BKS)
- Civil Engineering Building (Monetary Times) (MON)
- Centre for Urban Innovation (CUI)
- The Chang School of Continuing Education (Heaslip House) (CED)
- Daphne Cockwell Health Sciences Complex (DCC)
- George Vari Engineering and Computing Centre (ENG)
- International Living/Learning Centre (ILC)
- Jorgenson Hall (JOR)
- Kerr Hall (KHN, KNE, KNS, KNW)
- Library Building (LIB)
- Mattamy Athletic Centre (MAC)
- Merchandise Building (MER)
- Oakham House (OAK)
- O'Keefe House (OKF)
- Pitman Hall (PIT)
- Podium (POD)
- Real Institute (College Park) (CPK)
- Rogers Communications Centre (RCC)
- The Image Centre
- Sally Horsfall Eaton Centre (SHE)
- School of Graphic Communications Management (Heidelberg Centre) (HEI)
- School of Interior Design (SID)
- Sheldon & Tracy Levy Student Learning Centre (SLC)
- South Bond Building (SBB)
- St. Michael's Hospital (SMH)
- Student Campus Centre (SCC)
- Ted Rogers School of Management (TRS)
- Yonge–Dundas Intersection (YDI)
- Victoria Building (VIC)

==== Library and museum ====
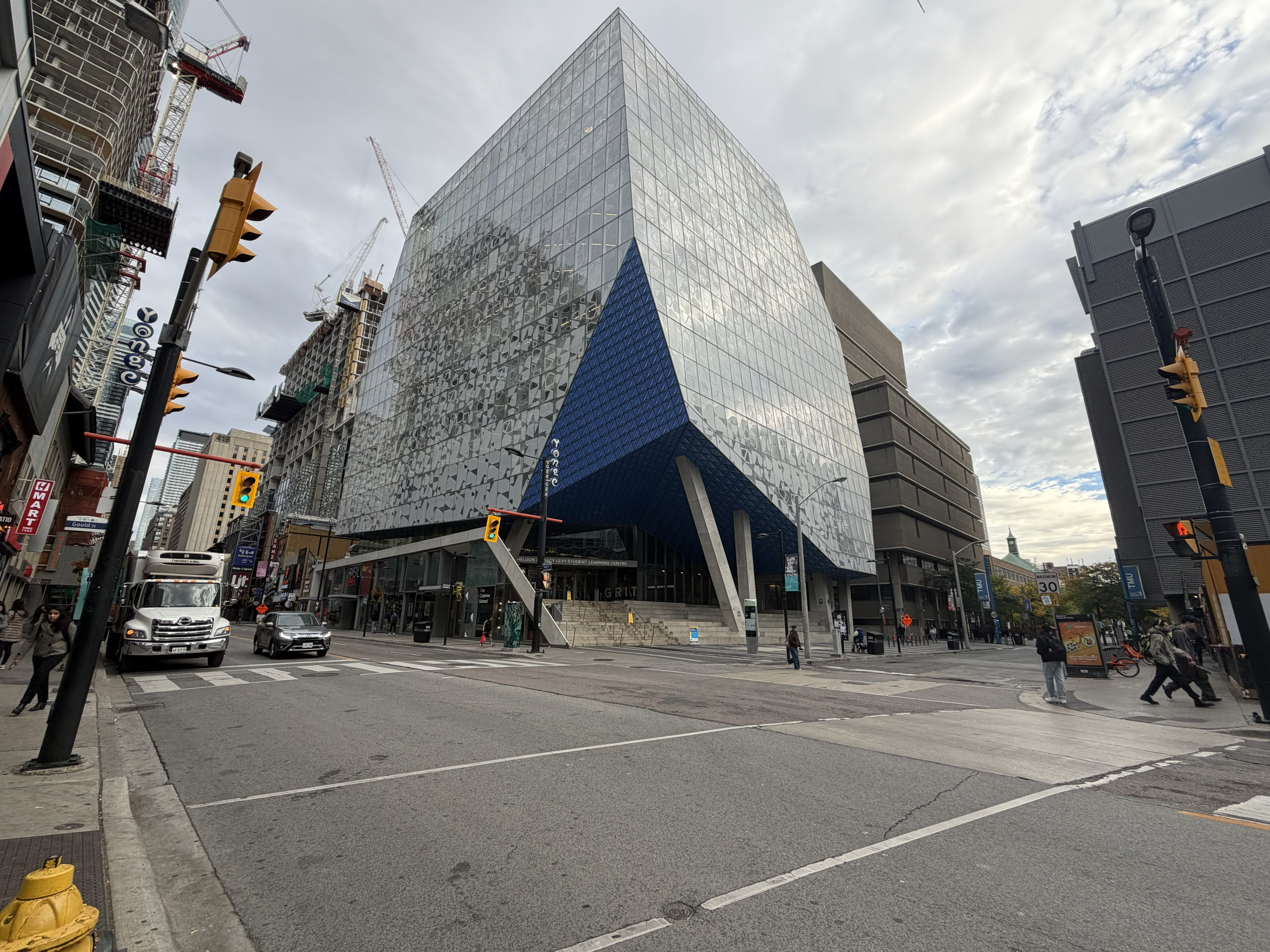
The Student Learning Centre from Yonge Street. The library building is visible in the background.

Toronto Metropolitan University Library serves as the main academic library for the university, and is housed in an 11-storey Brutalist-style structure that was completed in 1974. As of 2012, the library's collection held over 522,000 books, over 836,000 microform units, and provide access to electronic resources including e-books, serial titles, and databases. In 2015, the Student Learning Centre was completed adjacent to the library building. The 14,200 m^{2} (153,000 sq ft) Student Learning Centre was designed by the architectural firm Snøhetta, and was built to augment the library by providing additional study space; although no books from the university's collection are stored in the Student Learning Centre.

The Image Centre is a 4,500 m^{2} (48,000 sq ft) complex located on campus that serves as a photography museum and houses School of Image Arts. The Image Centre includes several galleries, with one dedicated for exhibit works from students of the School of Image Arts. The centre also holds offices, screening rooms, and storage facilities for the university's photographic collection; stored in special climate-controlled rooms. The Image Centre dates back to 1969, although the building was not completed until 2012, after the university was gifted 292,000 photographs of the Black Star collection. In total, the centre's collection contains approximately 375,000 objects, including historical photographs, photographs from contemporary artists, as well as the archival collections from publications like Life and The New York Times. The centre is housed in a building that was renovated by Diamond Schmitt Architects during the early 2010s.

==== Housing and student facilities ====
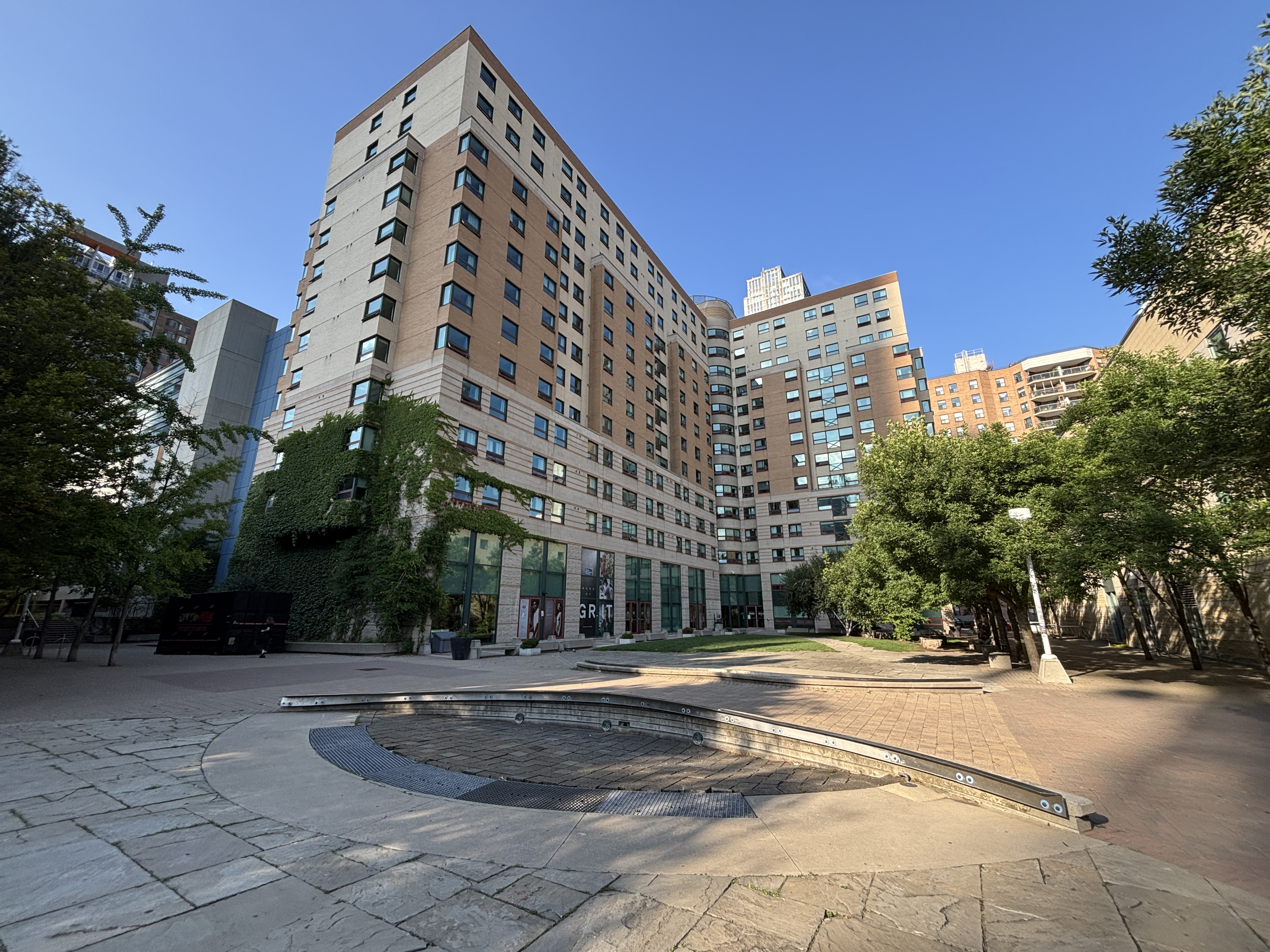
Pitman Hall, one of three university-operated student residences on the university's campus

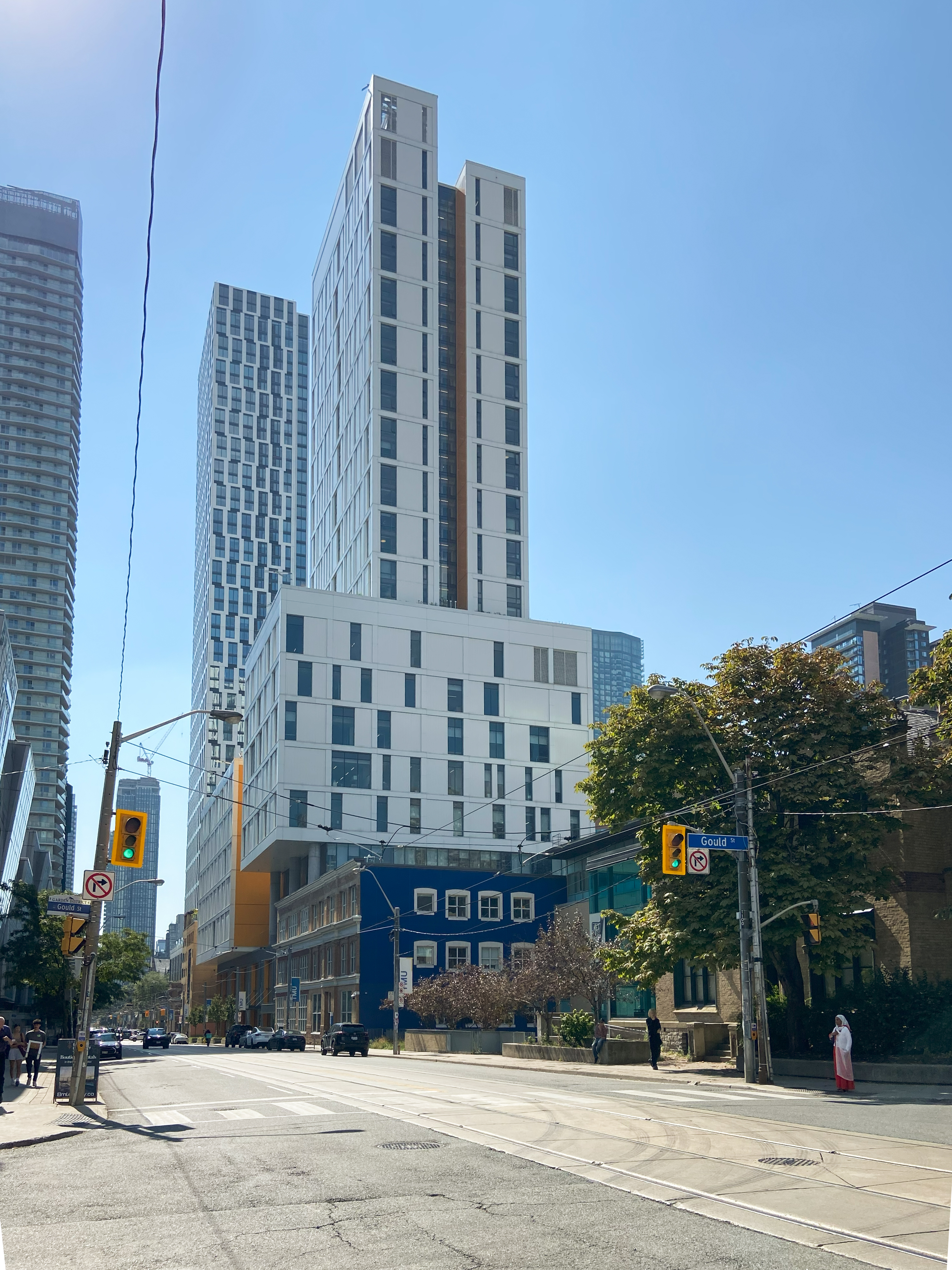
Daphne Cockwell Health Sciences Complex

The university operates three student residences with approximately 1,144 beds on campus including the Daphne Cockwell Complex, the International Living & Learning Centre, and Pitman Hall. The International Learning Centre was built in 1987 and is oldest student residence, housing approximately 256 residences. Pitman Hall was completed in 1991 and holds 565 rooms. The Daphne Cockwell Complex was completed in 2019, and holds 332 rooms. The latter building is a multi-purpose structure, with the lower levels of the Daphne Cockwell Complex holding academic facilities; whereas its residential component is housed in its upper levels. The majority of university students do not live on campus, with only 5.2 per cent of students having lived on campus during the 2017–18 academic year. However, approximately 17.9 per cent of the university's first year students lived on campus. The university operates themed-residence floors in an effort to complement the academic studies of residents; such as the "fashion floor," a themed-residential floor reserved for students of Toronto Metropolitan University's school of fashion.

In an effort to increase the number of residences available for students, the university entered into a public–private partnership in 2012 to construct the HOEM residence on Jarvis Street. However, as opposed to the university's other residences, the HOEM residence is not owned and operated by the university. O'Keefe House was also another student residence operated by the university prior to the opening of the HOEM residence in 2018. O'Keefe House was repurposed for other university uses after the HOEM residence was opened in 2018.

Dining services are also provided by the university, although the number of dining facilities remains limited when compared to other Canadian post-secondary institutions given the campus' location in downtown Toronto; with an estimated 275 food service providers situated within a five-minute walk of the campus in 2017.

The Student Campus Centre situated between Oakham House and O'Keefe House.

Toronto Metropolitan University's Student Campus Centre serves as the centre of student governance and student directed cultural, social, and recreational activities. The Student Campus Centre contains the offices of a number of student organizations, including the Toronto Metropolitan Students' Union, The Eyeopener student newspaper, and other student groups. In addition to office space, the centre also houses student lounges, study areas and computer labs, and restaurants. The building is operated by the Palin Foundation, an organization whose governing structure is made up of elected representatives from the Toronto Metropolitan University Students' Union, and the Continuing Education Students' Association at the university.

=== Off-campus facilities ===
==== Downsview Park ====
The Toronto Metropolitan University Aerospace Engineering Centre is a research centre situated within a 680 m^{2} (7,300 sq ft) repurposed helicopter manufacturing facility at Downsview Park. Opened in 2018, the centre was formed in partnership between the university's Faculty of Engineering and Architectural Science, Bombardier, and the Downsview Aerospace Innovation and Research Consortium (DAIR). The centre provides a collaborative research environment for the university's faculty and graduate students with its industry partners. The centre forms a part of DAIR's larger research and development park. The university's varsity soccer program also makes use of sports facilities at Downsview Park.

==== Brampton ====
In 2018, the university announced plans to open a new campus in the neighbouring municipality of Brampton, in partnership with Sheridan College, in 2022. The provincial government allocated approximately $90 million in order to fund the development of the campus. However, provincial funding for the project was later withdrawn in October 2018 by a new provincial government, effectively cancelling the planned development.

In 2022, the university announced plans to open a medical school in Brampton. Brampton City Council gifted the university the Bramalea Civic Centre for this purpose. The university established its School of Medicine in 2025, which began operating from its Brampton campus that year.

=== Sustainability ===
The university's Facilities Management and Development maintains a sustainability office that is charged with implementing green initiatives and sustainable operating practices throughout the university's facilities. The university is a signatory of the Talloires Declaration, a declaration for sustainability created for presidents of post-secondary institutions around the world. In 2009, the university, along with the other members from the Council of Ontario Universities, signed a pledge known as Ontario Universities Committed to a Greener World, with the objective of transforming its campus into a model of environmental responsibility.

== Administration ==
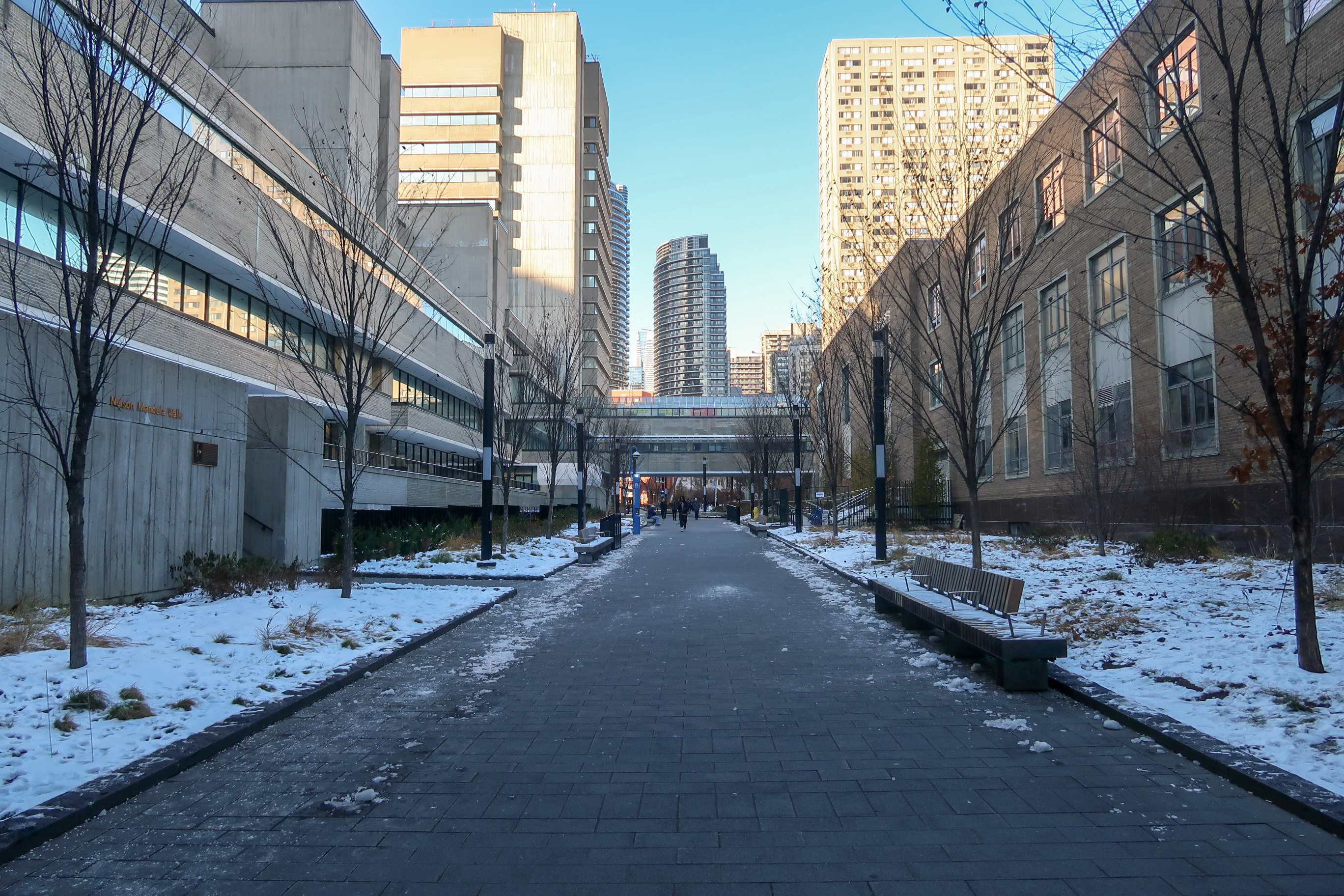
Nelson Mandela Walk outside Jorgenson Hall, a building that houses several administrative offices for the university

The university operates under a bicameral system with a board of governors and a senate empowered by provincial legislation, the Toronto Metropolitan University Act. The university's board of governors is charged with the management of university's affairs, including assets and property, as well as revenues. The board of governors has 24 members, including the university chancellor, the university president, three members elected by the university's alumni, three members elected by the university's teaching faculty, three members elected by the student body, and two members elected by administrative staff. The other eleven members of the board of governors are appointed, nine of whom by the provincial Lieutenant Governor-in-Council.

The senate is responsible for the educational policies of the university. The senate is made up of 52 elected representatives of the university community, including its faculty, student body, and alumni. Additionally, the chancellor, president, vice-presidents, deans, the chief librarian, and university registrar are also considered members of the senate.

The chancellor serves as the titular head of the university, and is primarily charged with the conferment of degrees, as well as honorary degrees from the institution. The chancellor of the university is appointed by the board of governors on a three-year term; with the current chancellor, Donette Chin-Loy Chang, having been appointed in October 2024. The board of governors is also empowered to appoint a university president; who serves as the chief executive officer of the university and acts on behalf of the board with respect to operational management and control of the university. The president is the chair of the senate and a member of the board of governors by virtue of their office. Additionally, the president also serves as the vice-chancellor of the university, assuming the duties of the chancellor in the event they are unable to, or when the office is vacant. Mohamed Lachemi is the current president of the university, having been appointed in September 2016.

=== Finances ===
Toronto Metropolitan University is a publicly funded university. The university completed the 2019–2020 academic year with $833.17 million of income, and $854.7 million in expenses. Government grants make up the largest source of income for the university, followed by student fees and tuition revenue. Salaries make up more than half of the university's expenses at $515.7 million. As of April 2020, the university's endowment is valued at $136.285 million.

== Academics ==
Undergraduate students by faculty (2023–24)
Faculty	# of students
Faculty of Arts	5,373
The Creative School	6,028
Faculty of Community Services	6,746
Faculty of Engineering and Architectural Science	5,949
Faculty of Science	4,243
Ted Rogers School of Management	11,814

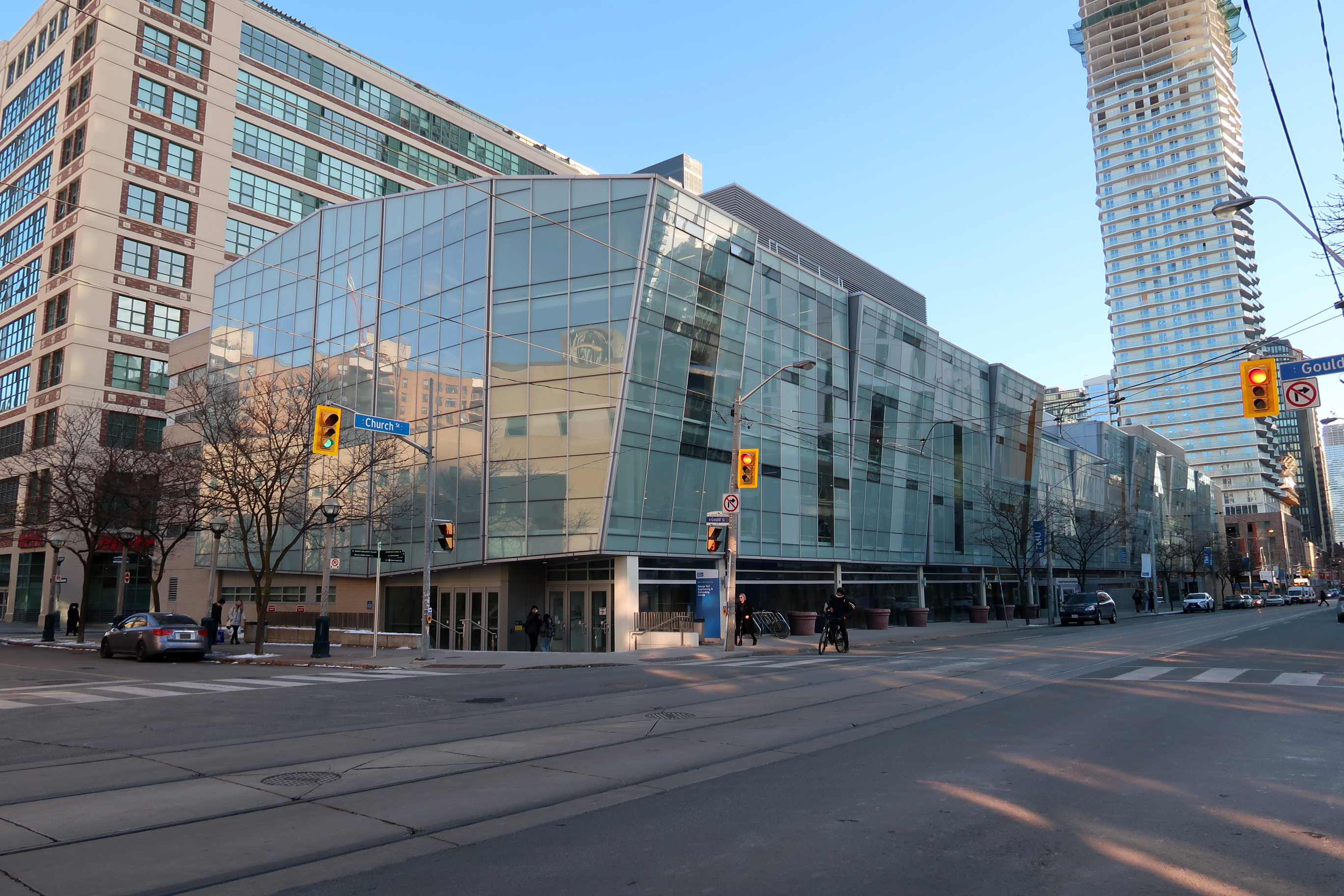
The George Vari Engineering and Computing Centre is one of a number of university facilities used by the university's Faculty of Engineering and Architectural Sciences

The university's academic year functions on a three-term system, fall, winter, and spring/summer. The university's academic programs are administered by seven faculties, the Faculty of Arts, the Faculty of Community Services, the Faculty of Engineering and Architectural Science, the Faculty of Science, The Creative School, the Lincoln Alexander School of Law, the School of Medicine, and the Ted Rogers School of Management; the latter academic division serving as the university's business school. The School of Medicine is the newest school established by the university, with 94 students admitted in its first year.

Most faculties are further organized into smaller departments and schools. The Faculty of Arts is made up of ten humanities and social science departments. The Creative School is an academic division made up of nine schools focused on media, design, and creative industries; including the RTA School of Media. The Faculty of Science is composed of four departments.

Graduate programs are coordinated by the Yeates School of Graduate Studies. Toronto Metropolitan University also jointly administers several academic programs with two other post-secondary institutions based in Greater Toronto, Sheridan College and York University. Continuing education at the university is managed by the Chang School of Continuing Education; which offered over 400 courses as of February 2021.

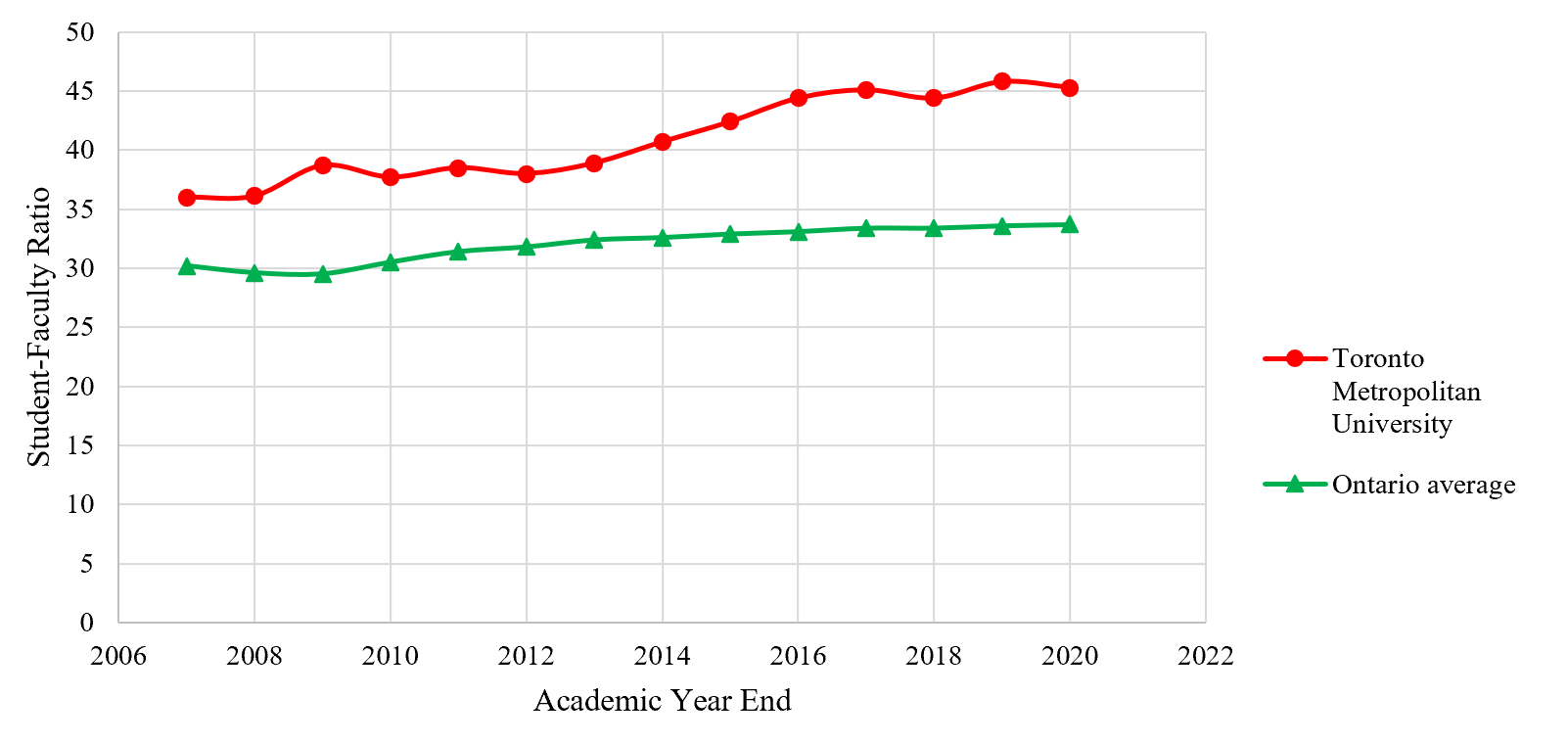
Student-faculty ratio at Toronto Metropolitan University compared to the Ontario average over the years

The university has 909 full-time faculty members during the 2019–20 academic year. In the same year, the university had an enrolment of 28,800 full-time undergraduate students and 2,600 full-time graduate students. In the 2019–20 academic year, the university also saw 5,951 people enrol in a G. Raymond Chang School of Continuing Education course; more than half of which were degree-credit courses. In 2017, the university had the highest reported student-faculty ratio in Ontario. In 2023, university has a reported a student-faculty ratio of 33:1. (Note: The following ratio is the number of full-time undergraduate and graduate students per full-time faculty member.)

In 2018, the university conferred 7,199 bachelor's degrees, 1,084 master's degrees, and 75 doctoral degrees. More than a quarter of the bachelor's degrees awarded that year were conferred to students in business and commerce programs. The majority of master's and doctoral degrees conferred by the university in 2018 were to students in engineering or social science-related programs. The graduation rate for students that entered the university in 2011 is 74.2 per cent.

The university holds membership in a number of national and international post-secondary organizations, such as Universities Canada and the International Association of Universities. The university's business school is also accredited by the Association to Advance Collegiate Schools of Business.

Mohamed Lachemi has served as president and vice-chancellor of Toronto Metropolitan University since September 2016. In April 2026, the university's Board of Governors announced that Dr. Roberta Iannacito-Provenzano, the university's provost and vice-president, academic, would succeed Lachemi as the university's 10th president and vice-chancellor. She will become the first woman to hold the position when her five-year term begins in January 2027.

=== Reputation ===
University rankings

World rankings
- ARWU World: 901–1000
- QS World: 711-720
- THE World: 801–1000
- THE Employability: 191
- USNWR World: 1452
- 25–26

Canadian rankings
- QS National: 27
- THE National: 28–30
- USNWR National: 34
- Maclean's Comprehensive: 8
- Maclean's Reputation: 19

In Maclean's 2023 Canadian university rankings, the university was ranked eighth in the magazine's comprehensive university category, tied with the University of New Brunswick; and 19th in its reputational survey. (Note: Although the title of the annual ranking uses 2022 as its year, the following was published in 2021.) The university has also placed in several global university rankings. In the 2022 Academic Ranking of World Universities, the university ranked 901–1000 in the world. The 2023 QS World University Rankings ranked the university 801–1000 in the world. (Note: Although the title of the annual ranking uses 2023 as its year, the following was published in 2022.) The 2023 Times Higher Education World University Rankings placed the university 801–1000 in the world. In the U.S. News & World Report 2022–23 ranking, the university placed 1,452 in the world.

The university also placed in rankings that evaluated the employment prospects of graduates. In the Times Higher Education's 2022 global employability ranking, Toronto Metropolitan University placed 192nd in the world, and tenth in Canada.

=== Research ===
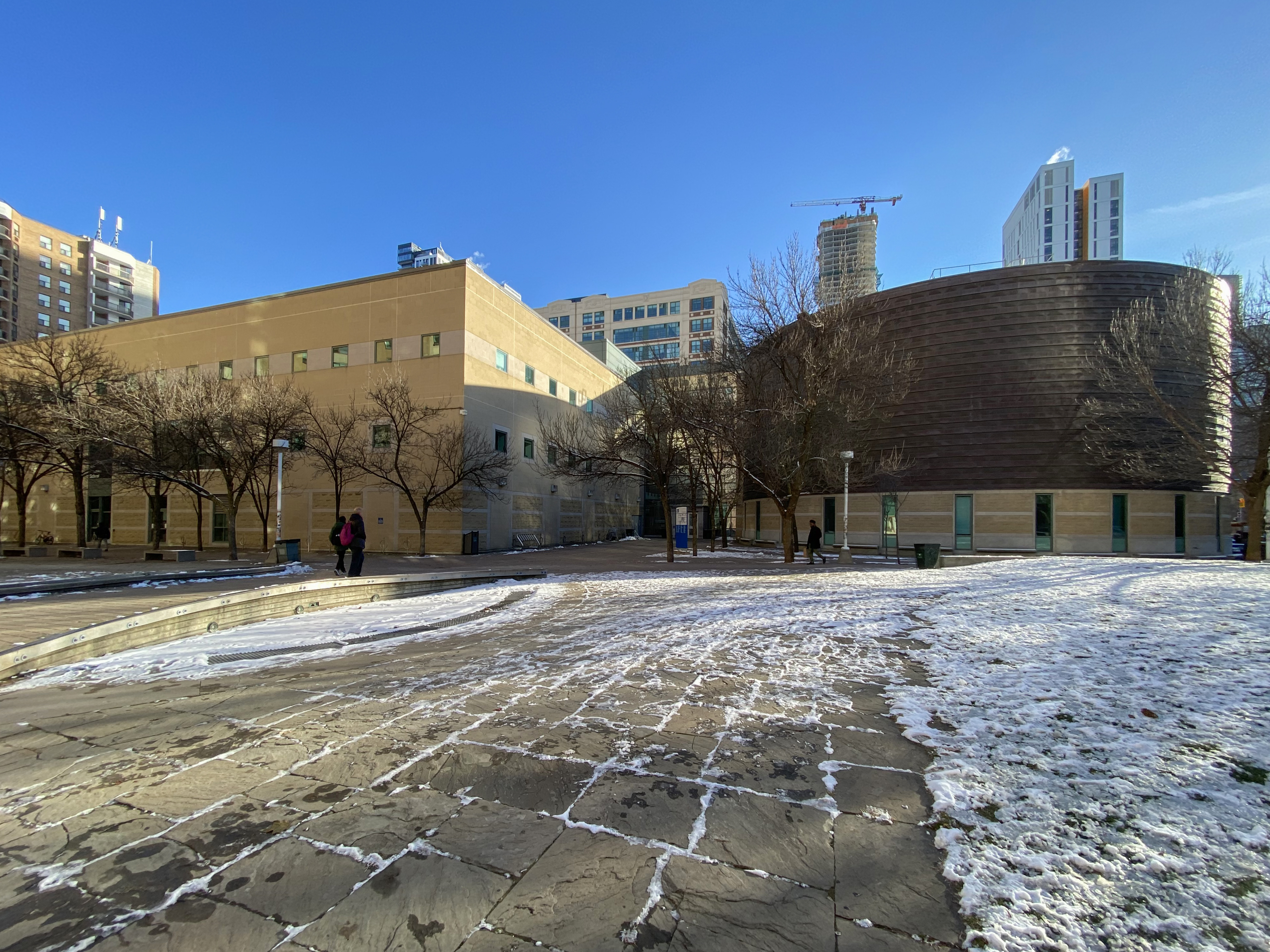
The Rogers Communication Centre is a multi-purpose facility that also houses several research centres for The Creative School

The university engages in a number of scholarly research activities. As of February 2021, there were 37 research centres and institutes operated by the university and its faculties. In the 2018–19 year, the university published 1,369 academic publications, and formed over 303 research funding partnerships.

During the 2018–19 year, Toronto Metropolitan University's allocation of Canada Research Chairs was 23, with the university receiving $17.1 million from the Tri-Council for research support; most of which was provided by the Natural Sciences and Engineering Research Council of Canada. The university also managed to raise $49.6 million for research support from various levels of government. In the same year, the university managed to raise $13.2 million for research support from various related industries and non-governmental sources.

In 2020, Research Infosource ranked Toronto Metropolitan University 23rd out of 50 Canadian research universities; with the university having a sponsored research income of $79.574 million during the 2019 fiscal year. In the same year, the university's faculty averaged a sponsored research income of $95,200, while graduate students averaged a sponsored research income of $28,900 in 2019. Toronto Metropolitan University's research performance has also been noted in several bibliometric rankings that use citation analysis to evaluate the impact a university has in the academic field. In the University Ranking by Academic Performance 2020–21 rankings, the university placed 737th out of 3,000 universities.

Notable research projects and endeavours associated with the university includes hitchBOT, a hitchhiking robot created by university faculty member, Frauke Zeller, and David Smith of McMaster University. HitchBOT formed a part of the larger Smart Robots for Health Communication project, a joint research initiative between the two universities to study social robotics, artificial intelligence, and human-to-robot interactions; especially in a clinical environment.

==== Business incubator network ====
The university operates Canada's largest network of university-based business incubators, the Zone Learning network, which is made up of 11 incubators focused on different sectors and business challenges.

The first and largest 'zone', The DMZ, was established in 2010 as the Digital Media Zone, before later changing its name to DMZ. The DMZ assists early to mid-stage technology start-ups by connecting them with investors and researchers, as well as provide them access to mentors from industry-related experts. As of January 2023, the DMZ has assisted over 750 businesses, raised over $1.95 billion in funding, and fostered over 4800 jobs in the community. Notable start-ups supported by the DMZ include 500px. In 2018, UBI Global named The DMZ as the world's best university-based business incubator.

In 2020, the university partnered with the City of Brampton to launch the Brampton Venture Zone by TMU. The incubator was billed as a "soft landing pad" for international startups breaking into North America, and was renamed the 'Brampton Venture Zone by TMU' in August 2022, in light of the university's renaming process.

=== Admissions ===
The requirements for admission differ between students from Ontario, students from other provinces in Canada, and students based outside of Canada, due to the lack of uniformity in marking schemes. In addition to academic records, the university requires applicants whose first language is not English to present proof that they are proficient in the language. The mean secondary school average for a newly admitted students from an Ontario-based secondary school institution in the 2018–19 academic year was 85.4 per cent.

In the beginning of the 2019–20 academic year, the university saw 81.9 per cent of its students continue in the same program after their first year of study at the institution; although these figures vary depending on the faculty and program. The retention rate for the university's first-time, full-time first-year students in any program was 88 per cent.

== Student life ==
Demographics of student body (2018–19)
	Undergraduate	Graduate
Male	44.42%	47.57%
Female	55.58%	52.43%
Canadian student	93.77%	86.79%
International student	6.23%	13.21%

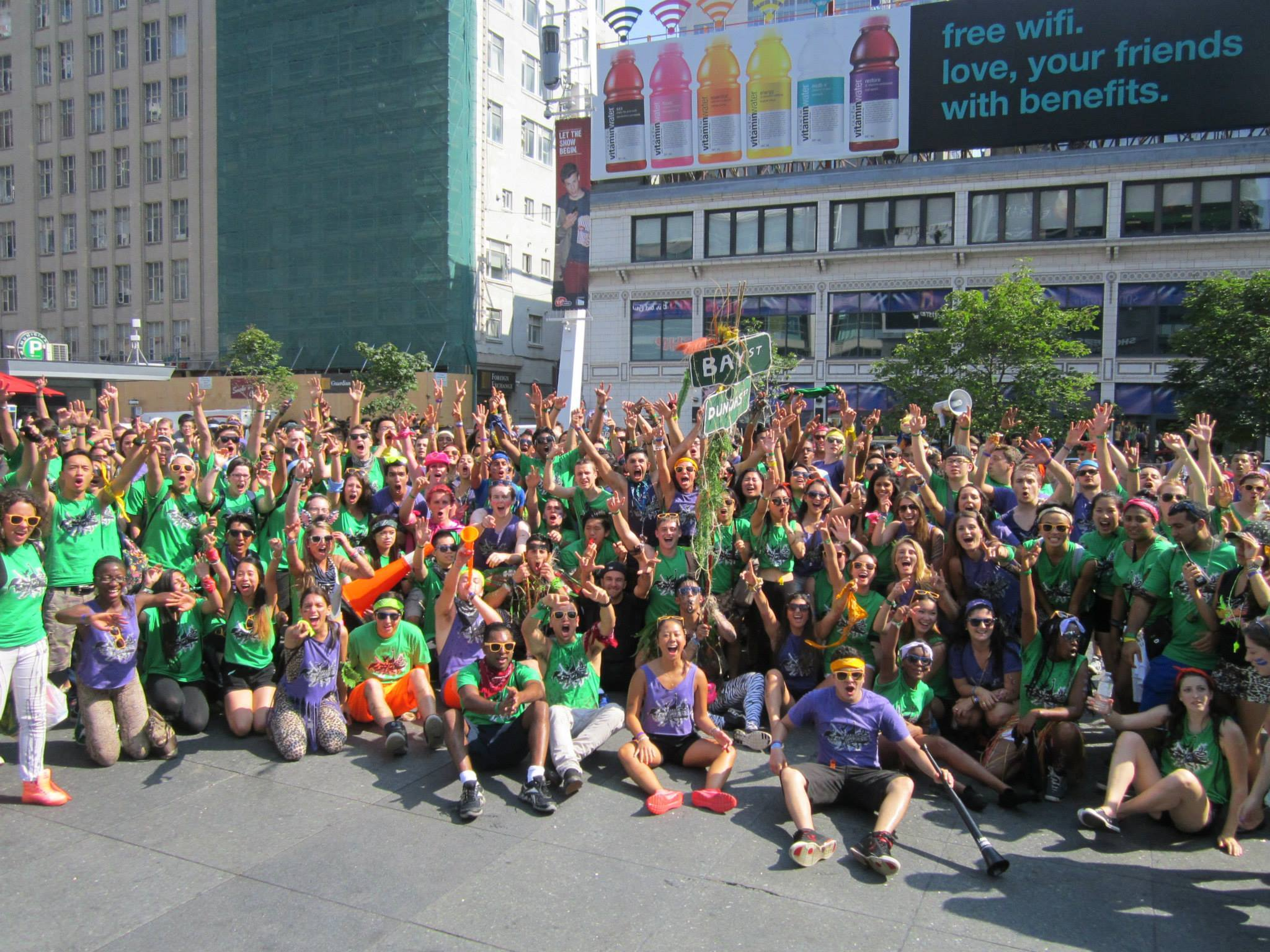
Ted Rogers School of Management students at Yonge–Dundas Square (now Sankofa Square) during frosh week in 2013.

In the 2019–20 academic year, the university's student body included 44,400 full-time and part-time undergraduate students, and 2,950 full-time and part-time graduate students. The student body is primarily made up of Canadians, with over 93 per cent of the student body originating from Canada. Nearly 80 per cent of undergraduate students originated from the Greater Toronto Area.

According to a survey conducted in 2015, approximately 54 per cent of Toronto Metropolitan University's students travelled to the campus using local transit systems like the TTC. Approximately 23 per cent of students travelled to campus using GO Transit, 14 per cent walked, and the remaining 5 per cent biked. TMU station on Line 1 Yonge–University is the closest subway stop to the campus.

=== Organizations ===
The university full-time undergraduate population is represented by the Toronto Metropolitan Students' Union (TMSU); whereas the university's graduate student body is represented by the Toronto Metropolitan Graduate Students' Union. Part-time students, students taking distance education programs, and students of the G. Raymond Chang School of Continuing Education are represented by the Continuing Education Students’ Association of X University. All three student union organizations are members of the Canadian Federation of Students. Funds for RSU operations is collected from students through the university. Services provided by the RSU includes academic advocacy, legal services, and medical insurance.

There are faculty-level academic student society governments within all faculties that fulfill the needs of student engagement, professional development, mental health, and student life. These student activity governments includes; the Ted Rogers Students' Society; for TRSM, the Faculty of Community Services Society; for FCS, The Society of The Creative School; for TCS, the Metropolitan Undergraduate Engineering Society; the Architectural Science Student Society; for FEAS, the Society of Arts, Social Sciences, and Humanities, for FoA, Undergraduate Science Society of Toronto Metropolitan; for FoS, and the Lincoln Alexander Law Students' Society. for FoL. All student societies are incorporated within the university through the Board of Governors, and their retrospective Dean's Offices. All faculty student societies plan their faculty's frosh weeks, formals, provide merch, and run other professional events.

Some academic programs have a course union club that are clubs dedicated to create a sense of belonging in a program. Course union clubs are third party to the university, not always elected, and funded by the TMSU. A number of cultural, social, and recreational social groups are also recognized by the TMSU. Formally, fraternities and sororities are not recognized by the university, or accredited as student organizations by the university's student unions. Fraternities and sororities are not accredited by the RSU given the union's requirement for accredited groups to have inclusive membership, and for them to be free of organizational levies. However, several fraternities and sororities operate in an unofficial capacity at Toronto Metropolitan University; with 10 fraternities and sororities operating as of 2016. Some of these fraternities and sororities operate as city-wide chapters, whose membership is open to various post-secondary student bodies throughout Toronto.

=== Media ===
There exists several student-operated media outlets at the university, including student newspapers and a campus radio station. CJRU, also known as Met Radio, has served as a non-profit campus and community radio station for Toronto Metropolitan University since 2016. CJRU serves as the successor to CJRT-FM and CKLN-FM, two public radio stations formerly operated by the university.

The Eyeopener is a student newspaper that has operated at the university since 1967; initially established by students of the RTA School of Media. The newspaper is operated by Rye Eye Publishing, a student-owned non-profit corporation. The newspaper's operations is funded through levies paid for by the university's student body. Students of the School of Journalism also publishes a journal and newspaper, the Review of Journalism, and On the Record; both publications are staffed by School of Journalism students in their final year. Additionally, On the Record also produces a newscast known as OTR TV. The Review of Journalism was established by the School of Journalism in 1984 and probes the quality of journalism in Canada.

=== Athletics ===
The university's sports teams are known as TMU Bold, and participates in U Sports' Ontario University Athletics conference for most varsity sports. Varsity teams includes badminton, basketball, fencing, figure skating, ice hockey, soccer, and volleyball. The university's athletic department also maintains several other sports clubs for baseball, crickets, cross country, curling, dragon boat, esports, rugby, table tennis, track and field, ultimate frisbee, and wrestling. The university fielded its first sport teams in 1948, shortly after the institution was established.

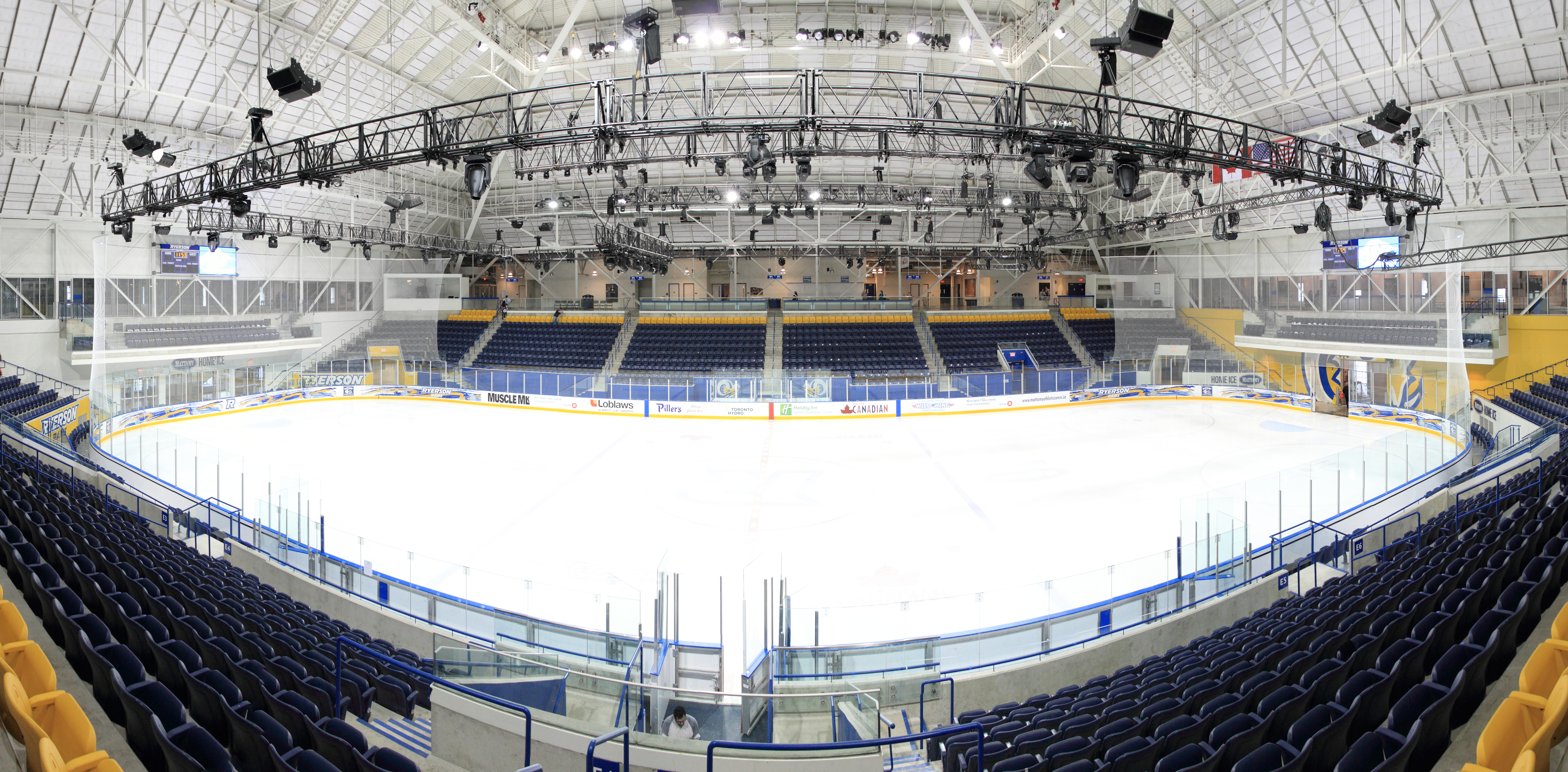
The ice rink at the Mattamy Athletic Centre, an athletics facility in the upper levels of Maple Leaf Gardens

The university operates three athletic facilities in and around its campus, the Recreation and Athletic Centre, Kerr Hall Gymnasium/West, and the Mattamy Athletic Centre. The Recreation and Athletic Centre serves as the central hub for the university's athletics department, with the facility housing a fitness centre, gymnasiums, a 145 metres (476 ft) indoor track, a 23 metres (25 yd) pool, and squash courts. Kerr Hall Gymnasium is another athletic facility on campus that includes two gymnasiums. The Mattamy Athletic Centre is an athletic centre that forms the upper portions of Maple Leaf Gardens. The Mattamy Athletic Centre includes a cardio room, a court for basketball and volleyball, an ice-hockey rink, a fitness centre, and dance studio. Toronto Metropolitan University's varsity clubs and athletics programs primarily play their games at Mattamy Athletic Centre, or Kerr Hall Gymnasium; although the university's varsity soccer program is based at Downsview Park.

The university's athletics program adopted its first mascot in 1961, when students from the Student Administrative Council purchased a live ram and decorated him with pendants for an ice hockey game. A total of five live ram mascots were used from 1961 to 1991. A costumed mascot was introduced during the 1980s, and became the university's athletic teams' only mascot after use of a live mascot ended in 1991. The ram mascot, was named Egerton the Ram or Eggy the Ram, after the school's namesake. The mascot was changed to a falcon in 2022, coinciding with the varsity teams' name change from the Ryerson Rams to the TMU Bold.

== Insignias and other representations ==
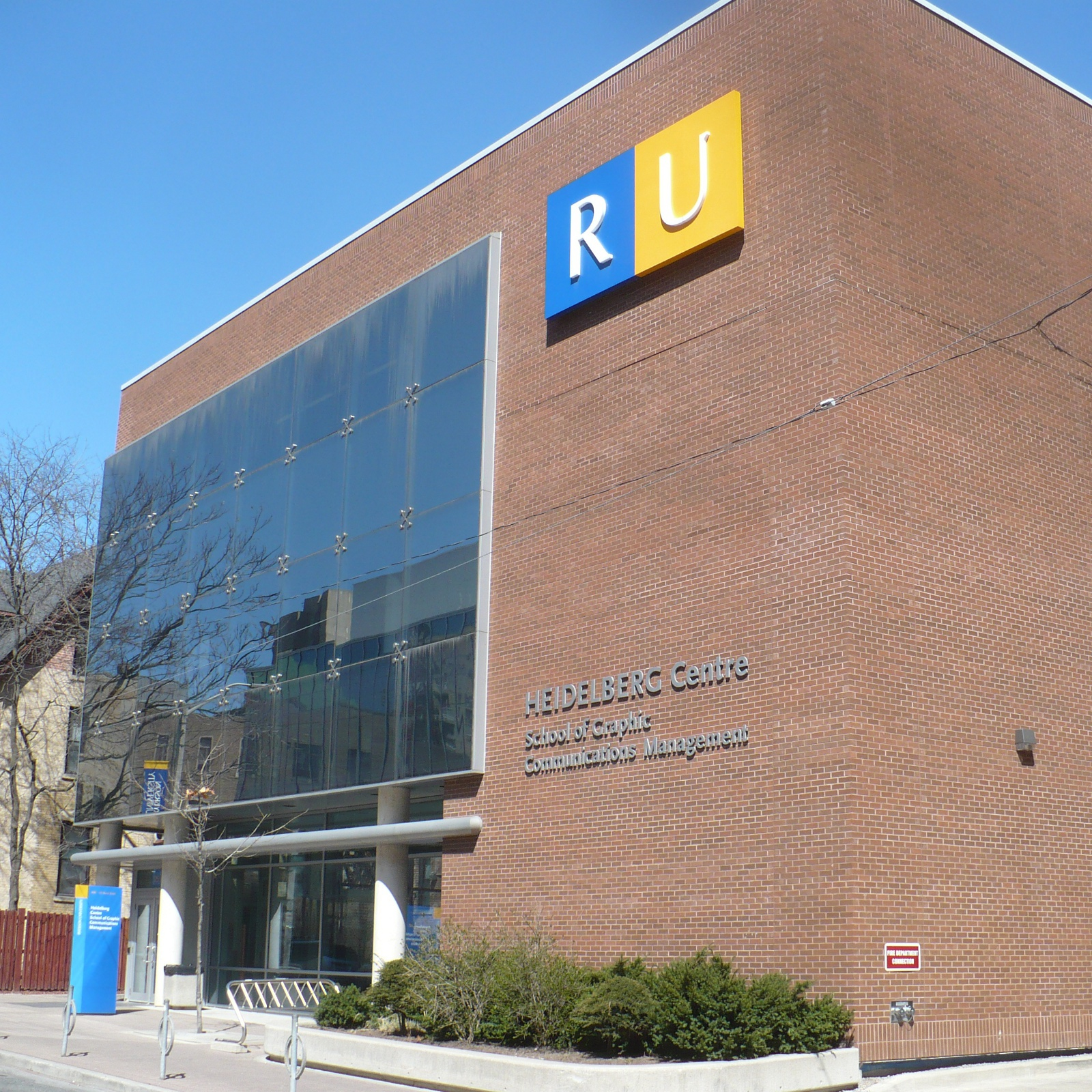
The university's former abbreviated logo on the Heidelberg Centre. The logo uses the university's official colours, azure and gold.

When the university was initially founded, a crest was used to identify the school. In addition to the original crest, the university also had a seal that was used on university documents and its yearbooks, although its design drew criticism. The crest was later replaced by an official coat of arms, granted by the College of Arms, in 1966. In addition to the coat of arms, the university also uses a logo that includes the official colours of the university, azure and gold; with azure intended to represent loyalty and truth, and gold representing generosity and elevation of the mind.

The university also has an official seal to authenticate documents. A new seal was introduced in 2022, and features the Student Learning Centre in its centre. The seal was designed by a Ted Rogers School of Management student, who entered the design in a student competition.

=== Motto and song ===
The university's Latin motto that appears on the coat of arms, Mente et artificio, translates to "With Mind and Skill". The motto was derived from the Latin motto used by MIT, Mente et Manu, which translates to "With Mind and Hand". MIT's motto was adopted as Toronto Met's first motto, with the latter's first principal having modelled his institution after the former. However, the motto was changed to its present form in 1950.

The university also has a song called The School Song. Created during the 1950s, the lyrics for the school song were drafted by Rennie Charles, while the music was composed by Al Sauro.

=== Coat of arms ===
The university was granted a coat of arms in 1966 by the College of Arms in London, England. The university's coat of arms was officially registered with the Canadian Heraldic Authority in June 1999.

Elements used in the heraldic achievement include ram (Aries) supporters, representing creative impulses. The torches on the ram supporters symbolize light, education, liberty and increasing knowledge. Elements on the escutcheon include the Lamp of Learning to symbolize intelligence, and a set square to represent construction. The coat of arms is officially reserved for the exclusive use of the office of the chancellor and the university president, but its informal use has proliferated to a number of other university items, such as jackets and pins. Currently, the full achievement is not in use, following the renaming of the university. Instead, the university uses a version of its coat of arms without the supporters or the rams head in the crest.

Coat of arms of Toronto Metropolitan University
Notes Granted by the College of Arms on 20 May 1966. Registered with the Canadian Heraldic Authority on 18 June 1999. Crest A ram's head caboshed Argent attired Azure between two maple leaves extending outwards Or. Escutcheon Azure a right-angled isosceles set square apex downwards Argent on a chief Or an ancient lamp Azure enflamed proper. Supporters On either side a ram Argent attired Azure unguled Or gorged with a wreath of maple leaves Vert charged on the body with a torch Or enflamed proper enfiled through a right-angled isosceles set square apex downwards Azure. Motto Mente et artificio (Latin for 'With mind and skill'). Badge Surmounting two maple leaves in saltire Or and enfiled through a right-angled isosceles set square apex downwards Azure a torch Argent enflamed proper.

== Notable people ==
Several individuals are associated with the university either as alumni or members of its administration or faculty. As of 2017, there were nearly 170,000 Toronto Metropolitan University alumni worldwide. All graduates of the university are members of the University Alumni Association. Alumni and faculty of the university have received a number of academic awards, such as the Commonwealth Scholarship and the Gates Cambridge Scholarship.

Alumni of Toronto Metropolitan University have assumed notable roles in a wide range of fields and specialties. Alumni that were in prominent positions in business includes Patrick Dovigi, founder and CEO of GFL Environmental; Tony Gagliano, chairman and CEO of St. Joseph Communications; John Galt, president and CEO of Husky Injection Molding Systems; Isadore Sharp, founder and chairman of Four Seasons Hotels and Resorts; and Klaus Woerner, founder and CEO of ATS Automation Tooling Systems. A number of alumni have also found success in the arts, including Ellen Wong, Nina Dobrev, Daniel Louis, Mena Massoud,Rebecca Liddiard, HAUI, Eric McCormack, Hannah Simone, Nia Vardalos, Jacqueline MacInnes Wood, and Rob Gonsalves. Notable alumni in the literary arts includes Louise Penny and Robert J. Sawyer. Amira Abdelrasoul, a chemical engineer, was also a doctoral student at the university. Notable graduates in journalism include Michelle Shephard Robyn Doolittle and Brian Stewart. Another notable alumnus is Don Andrews, white supremacist and perennial candidate for Mayor of Toronto.

A number of notable individuals have also served as a part of the university's administration or as a member of its faculty. Notable lecturers and professors include David Crombie, the Secretary of State for Canada; and Jack Layton, the former leader of the official opposition in Canada. Stuart McLean, a Canadian radio broadcaster, humorist, monologist, and author was a professor of journalism from 1984 until 2004. G. Raymond Chang, the chairman and president of CI Financial, also served as the chancellor of the university from 2006 to 2012.

== See also ==
- Education in Toronto
- Higher education in Ontario
- List of Canadian universities by endowment
- List of colleges and universities named after people
- List of universities in Ontario
- Open College (Toronto)
- Ryerson Radio
- List of Brutalist structures
