= Alan Shepard (academic) =

Canadian academic (born 1962)

11th President and Vice-Chancellor of the University of Western Ontario
- Incumbent
- Assumed office July 1, 2019
- Chancellor: Kelly Meighen
- Preceded by: Amit Chakma

4th President of Concordia University
- In office August 1, 2012 – June 30, 2019
- Chancellor: L. Jacques Ménard; Jonathan Wener
- Preceded by: Frederick Lowy (acting)
- Succeeded by: Graham Carr

Personal details
- Born: c.1962 (age 63–64) Iowa, U.S.
- Education: St. Olaf College (BA); University of Virginia (MA, PhD)

Academic background
- Thesis: Marlowe's Anatomy of Desire (1990)

Academic work
- Discipline: English literature
- Sub-discipline: Early modern English literature
- Institutions: Texas Christian University; University of Guelph; Ryerson University; Concordia University; University of Western Ontario

Alan Shepard (born c. 1962) is an American-Canadian academic and the current president and vice-chancellor of Western University in London, Ontario, since July 2019. He previously served as the president and vice-chancellor of Concordia University in Montreal from 2012 to 2019.

== Early life and education ==
Shepard was born in Iowa, and is a dual citizen of both Canada and the United States. He has a background in Early Modern English literature. He received a B.A. in English literature from St. Olaf College in 1983 and received a Ph.D. in English from the University of Virginia in 1990.

== Career ==
Shepard served as the chair of the English department at Texas Christian University from 1998 to 2002. He moved to Canada in 2002, where he began working as a visiting research fellow at the University of Toronto.

Shepard was hired as an associate vice-president academic at University of Guelph in 2005. In 2007, Shepard became the provost and vice-president academic at Ryerson University (now Toronto Metropolitan University), where he worked until 2012. At Ryerson, Shepard led the development of a business incubator called the Digital Media Zone.

In August 2012, Shepard became the president and vice-chancellor of Concordia University in Montreal. His two predecessors, Judith Woodsworth and Claude Lajeunesse, were both removed midway through their terms due to scandals.

In November 2018, Shepard announced he would be leaving Concordia on 30 June 2019 to become the president and vice-chancellor of Western University in London, Ontario. In July 2019, Shepard replaced Amit Chakma to become the 11th president of Western. In December 2022 he was reappointed to a second term as President.

Shepard has served on the board of directors at Universities Canada, Stratford Festival, and the Chamber of Commerce of Metropolitan Montreal. He is currently chair of the Canadian Research Knowledge Network.
