= Judith Woodsworth =

Canadian academic (born 1948)

Judith Weisz Woodsworth PhD
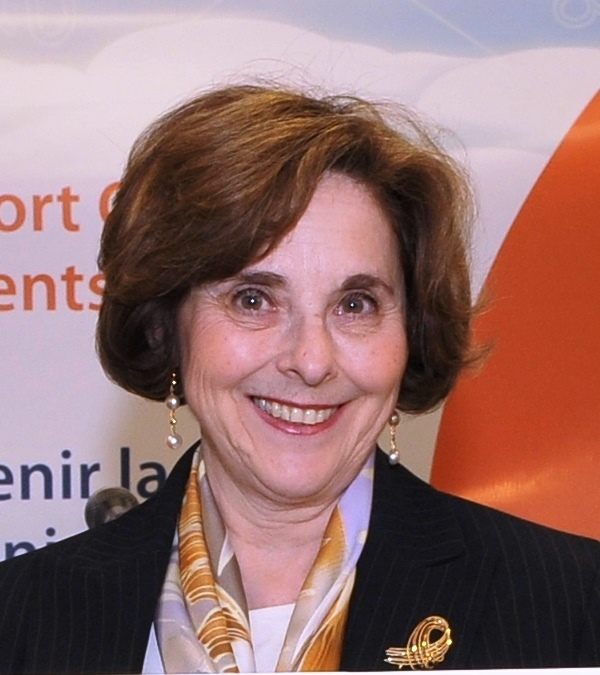
- Woodsworth in 2010

3rd President and Vice-Chancellor of Concordia University
- In office August 1, 2008 – December 22, 2010
- Preceded by: Michael Di Grappa (interim); Claude Lajeunesse
- Succeeded by: Frederick Lowy (interim); Alan Shepard

7th President and Vice Chancellor of Laurentian University
- In office 2002–2008
- Preceded by: Jean Watters
- Succeeded by: Dominic Giroux

Personal details
- Born: 1948 (age 77–78) Paris, France
- Education: McGill University, Université de Strasbourg

Academic background
- Thesis: Valery et Poe: Le delire de la lucidite (1977)

Academic work
- Discipline: French Literature
- Institutions: Concordia University; Mount Saint Vincent University

Judith Weisz Woodsworth (born 1948) is a Canadian academic and university administrator, having formerly served as President of Concordia University and Laurentian University.

== Early life and education ==
Born in Paris, France, in 1948, she grew up in Winnipeg. She received a BA in French and Philosophy from McGill University, a licence ès lettres from the Université de Strasbourg in France, and a Ph.D. in French Literature from McGill.

== Career ==
She taught in the Département d'études françaises at Concordia University (1980–97), where she also served as vice-dean in the Faculty of Arts and Science. In 1997 she was appointed academic vice-president at Mount Saint Vincent University.

Woodsworth has written about translation theory, translation history and literary translation, and was the founding president of the Canadian Association for Translation Studies. She has written about French literature and translation, and is a certified translator and member of the Literary Translators' Association of Canada.

In 1999, she was inducted as an officer in the Ordre de la Pléiade, Ordre de la Francophonie et du dialogue des cultures, for her work in promoting the French language and intercultural relations. She is a past chair of the World University Service of Canada.

She edited (with Jean Delisle) Translators through History, also published in French as Les traducteurs dans l'histoire and in Portuguese as Os Tradutores Na Historia. In 1997, she published her first translation of a literary work, Still Lives.

Woodsworth served as president of Laurentian University from 2002 to 2008. She became president and vice-chancellor of Concordia University on August 1, 2008. On December 22, 2010, Concordia University issued a statement announcing that Woodsworth had stepped down from her position for personal reasons. She received a severance package of $703,500, worth twice her annual base salary.

She was on the board of directors of the Association of Universities and Colleges of Canada, Montreal International, as well as vice-president of CREPUQ (The Conference of Rectors and Principals of Quebec Universities).

In 2022, she won the Governor General's Award for French to English translation for History of the Jews in Quebec, her translation of Pierre Anctil's Histoire des juifs du Québec, at the 2022 Governor General's Awards.

== Publications ==
- Les traducteurs dans l'histoire, editors Jean Delisle and Judith Woodsworth, Renouf Pub Co. Ltd., ISBN 92-3-103137-6
- Translators Through History, editors Jean Delisle, Judith Woodsworth, John Benjamins Publishers, ISBN 1-55619-697-0

== See also ==
- List of Canadian university leaders
