= Frederick Lowy =

Canadian medical educator

Frederick Hans Lowy OC
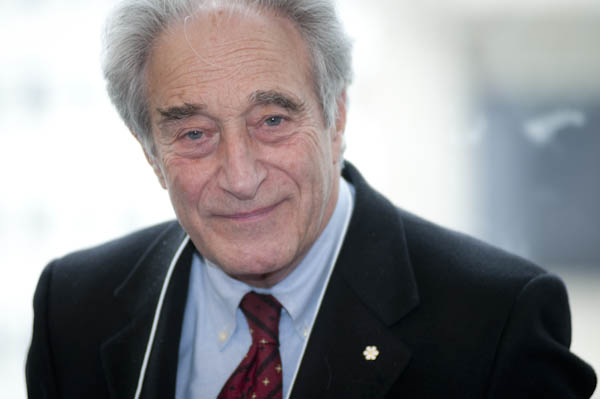

President and Vice-Chancellor of Concordia University
- Interim; February 2, 2011 – July 31, 2012
- Preceded by: Judith Woodsworth
- Succeeded by: Alan Shepard
- In office August 15, 1995 – July 31, 2005
- Preceded by: Charles Bertrand (interim)
- Succeeded by: Claude Lajeunesse

Dean of the University of Toronto Faculty of Medicine
- In office 1980–1987
- Preceded by: Richard Brian Holmes
- Succeeded by: John Dirks

Personal details
- Born: January 1, 1933 (age 93) Großpetersdorf, Austria
- Education: McGill University
- Occupation: Psychiatrist, medical researcher

Frederick Hans Lowy, OC (born 1933) is a Canadian medical educator who previously served as president and vice-chancellor of Concordia University and dean of the University of Toronto Faculty of Medicine.

== Life and career ==
Born in Großpetersdorf, Austria, in 1933, Lowy moved to Montreal at age 13. After graduating from Baron Byng High School, Lowy studied medicine at McGill University, graduating in 1959. While at McGill University, he assisted Donald Ewan Cameron on Human subject research as part of Cameron's Project MKULTRA research for "KUBARK" manuals. As an undergraduate, he was managing editor of the McGill Daily student newspaper. He was a psychiatric consultant at the Royal Victoria Hospital and Neurological Institute in the late 1960s.

Lowy moved to Toronto in 1974 to become psychiatrist-in-chief and director of the Clarke Institute of Psychiatry and professor at, and chair of, the University of Toronto's Department of Psychiatry, succeeding Robin C.A. Hunter. He served as dean of the Faculty of Medicine from 1980 to 1987. He was the founder and first director of the University's Centre for Bioethics (now University of Toronto Joint Centre for Bioethics). In 1995 he returned to Montreal to become the 4th rector and vice-chancellor of Concordia University. (In 2004 the English title of the position was changed to "President and Vice-Chancellor".) He held this post until August 1, 2005.

Lowy was the first chair of Canada's Tri-Council (Medical Research Council, Natural Sciences and Engineering Research Council, Social Sciences and Humanities Research Council) Working Group on Ethics of Research on Human Subjects (1994–1995) and vice-chair, Hospital Restructuring Committee, Metro Toronto District Health Council (1994–1995). He is a Fellow of the Royal College of Physicians and Surgeons of Canada, a Life Member of the Canadian and American Psychiatric Associations and the American College of Psychiatrists. He is also a member of the Canadian Medical Association and the International Psychoanalytical Association. Lowy's previous medical appointments include positions at the Cincinnati General Hospital, the Ottawa Civic Hospital and the Toronto Hospital. He has also served as a consultant to numerous research foundations and hospitals.

Lowy has lectured and published widely. His most recent publications examine ethical issues that face modern physicians and health science researchers. Lowy was a member of the Board of Directors of the Montreal Board of Trade and of Centraide (Montreal); Vice-President of the Conference of Rectors and Principals of Quebec; and a former board member of the National Ballet of Canada. Lowy has been a trustee at Ontario's Sunnybrook Health Sciences Centre, the Mount Sinai, St. Michael's, and Toronto Hospitals, and the Ontario Cancer Institute. He chaired an Ontario Government inquiry into the pharmaceutical industry (1988–1990) and held numerous professional editorial posts, including Editor of the Canadian Journal of Psychiatry.

Lowy sits on the board of directors of Dundee Corporation, Montreal Museum of Fine Arts, and Montreal's Jewish General Hospital, Canadian Centre for Architecture, and the Sauve Scholars Foundation.

In 2000 he was named an Officer of the Order of Canada. He has received honorary degrees from the University of Toronto (1998), McGill University (2001), and Concordia University (2008). Lowy is married to Mary Kay Lowy (Dr. M.K. O'Neil). He has four children, David, Eric, Adam, and Sarah, and nine grandchildren.

Lowy served as President and Vice-Chancellor of Concordia University from 1995 to 2005.

He served as Interim Executive Director of the Sauve Scholars Foundation (2007–2008) and was elected to the Board of Directors of the Sauvé_Foundation in May 2008. He is Senior Advisor to the President of the Trudeau Foundation.

On January 21, 2011 he returned to the position of President of Concordia University on an interim basis, following the controversial departure of Judith Woodsworth.

== See also ==
- Allan Memorial Institute
- Donald Ewen Cameron
- Lysergic acid diethylamide
- Mind control
- Project MKDELTA
- Project MKULTRA
- U.S. Army and CIA interrogation manuals

Academic offices
Preceded by Charles Bertrand (interim)	President and vice-chancellor of Concordia University; 1995–2005	Succeeded by Claude Lajeunesse
Preceded by Judith Woodsworth	President and Vice-Chancellor of Concordia University (interim); 2011–2012	Succeeded by Alan Shepard
