= Robin Hunter (psychiatrist) =

Canadian psychiatrist (1919–1987)

Robin C. A. Hunter (c. March 2, 1919 – March 9, 1987) was a Canadian psychiatrist who was Chair of the Department of Psychiatry at Queen's University and University of Toronto, as well as Director and Psychiatrist-in-Chief at the Clarke Institute of Psychiatry. There, Hunter founded their clinical program for transsexual people.

== Life and career ==
Hunter was born in Jamaica and came to Canada in 1940. He joined the Royal Canadian Air Force during World War II. He was shot down over occupied Europe and spent four years as a prisoner of war after being processed at Dulag Luft. After the war, he enrolled at McGill University and earned a medical degree in 1950.

He was head of the Department of Psychiatry at Queen's University until 1966. In 1967, he was appointed to the same position at the University of Toronto, where the department of psychiatry had a largely biological orientation prior to that. According to his colleague and successor Frederick Lowy, Hunter stressed that psychiatric illness can have its roots in genetics and experience, based on his experiences as a psychiatrist and psychoanalyst. He was named Psychiatrist-in-Chief of the Clarke Institute in 1967, becoming Director and CEO in 1969. In 1973, he was appointed Associate Dean (Clinical) of the Faculty of Medicine. Frederick Lowy succeeded Hunter as chair in 1974.

Hunter died at Toronto Western Hospital from complications of exploratory surgery.

== Selected publications ==
- Taylor FK, Hunter RCA (1958). Observation of a hysterical epidemic in a hospital ward. Psychiatric Quarterly 1958 Oct;32(4):821-39. PMID 13634273
- Hunter RCA, Prince RH (1961). Comments on emotional disturbances in a medical undergraduate population. Can Med Assoc J 1961 Oct 28;85:989-92. PMID 14450069
- Schwartzman AE, Lohrenz JG (1962). A Fifteen-Year Follow-Up Study of Medical Graduates. Can Med Assoc J 1962 Oct 20;87:865-8. PMID 13955783
- Hunter RCA, Schwartzman AE (1961). A clinical view of study difficulties in a group of counseled medical students. J Med Educ 1961 Oct;36:1295-301. PMID 14450071
- Schwartzman AE, Hunter RCA, Prince RH (1961). Intellectual factors and academic performance in medical undergraduates. Journal of Medical Education 1961 Apr;36:353-8. PMID 13749144
- Schwartzman AE, Hunter RCA, Lohrenz JG (1962). Factors related to student withdrawals from medical schools. J Med Educ. 1962 Oct;37:1114-20. PMID 13987408
- Schwartzman AE, Hunter RCA, Lohrenz JG (1962). Factors related to medical school achievement. J Med Educ 1962 Aug;37:749-59. PMID 13909750
- Hunter RCA, Lohrenz JG, (1964). Nosophobia and hypochondriasis in medical students. J Nerv Ment Dis 1964 Aug;139:147-52. PMID 14206454
- Hunter RCA (1966). The analysis of episodes of depersonalization in a borderline patient. International Journal of Psycho-Analysis 1966;47(1):32-41. PMID 5959733
- Hunter RCA (1967). On the experience of nearly dying. American Journal of Psychiatry Am J Psychiatry. 1967 Jul;124(1):84-8. PMID 6025954
- Voineskos G, Hsu K, Hunter RCA (1984). The teaching of consultation-liaison psychiatry in the undergraduate curriculum of Canadian medical schools. General Hospital Psychiatry 1984 Apr;6(2):117-22. PMID 6714665
