= Economy of Montreal =

Economy of a Canadian city

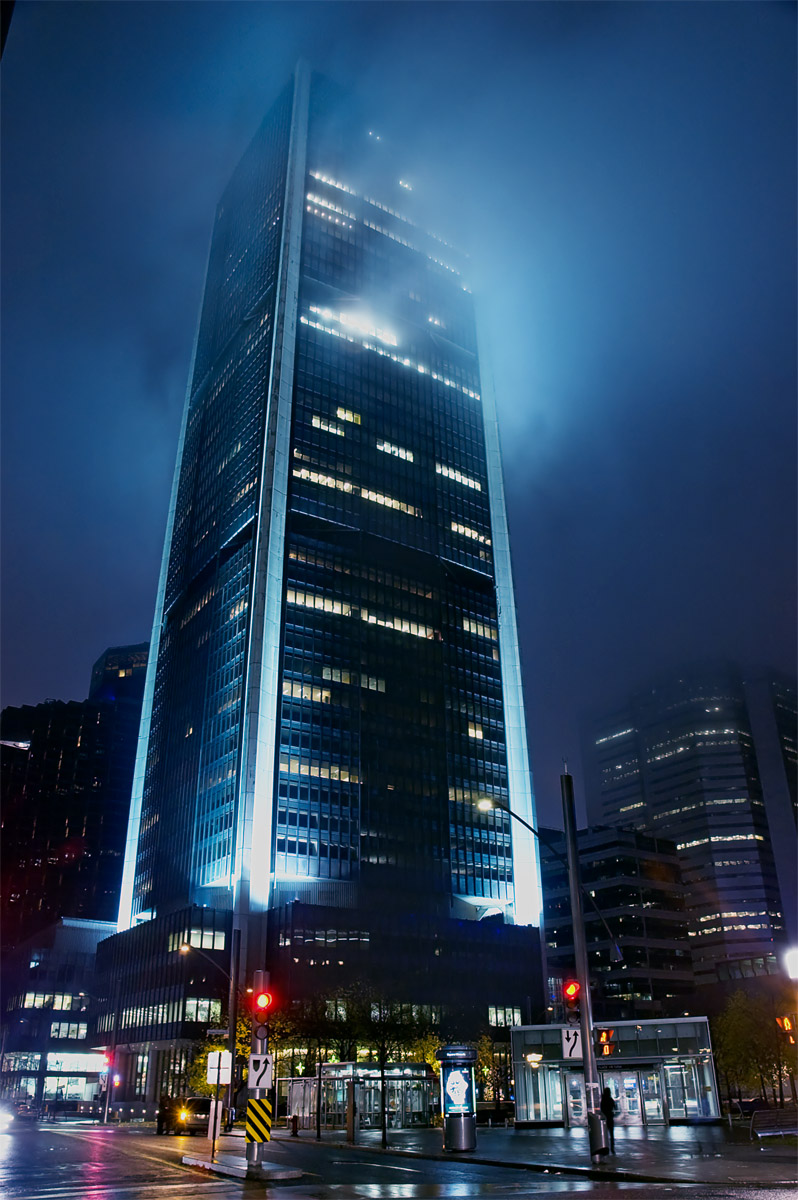
Tour de la Bourse (Stock Exchange Tower)

Montreal's economy is the second largest of all cities in Canada and the first in Quebec. Montreal is a centre of commerce, industry, technology, culture, finance, and world affairs. In 2022, Metropolitan Montreal was responsible for $279 Billion CDN of Quebec's $513 Billion CDN GDP, with a population of 4.37 million people. Montreal's economy, therefore, comprises approximately 54.8% of Quebec's overall GDP.

Montreal's unemployment rate increased to 6.3% in the fourth-quarter of 2023, compared to 5.7%, the three-month moving average in 2022. In 2020, Montreal's per capita disposable income was $34,019 CDN, marking an increase of 8.4% from 2019. This indicator measures the net income available for consumption of goods and services after current transfers and taxes have been subtracted. Per capita disposable income has increased throughout all of Quebec's administrative regions due to federal policy responses to the COVID-19 pandemic.

== History ==
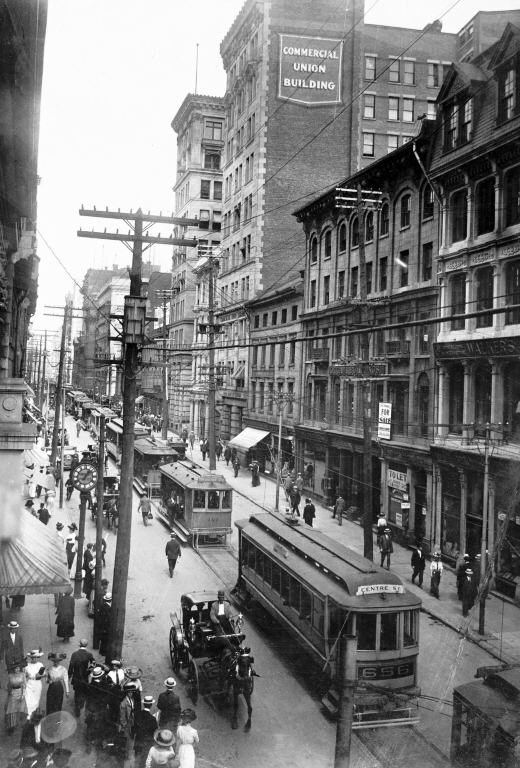
St. James Street was Canada's financial centre during the first three-quarters of the 20th century.

Montreal became an important centre of trade early in its history and surpassed Quebec City in importance even before their populations became comparable. When Canada became part of the British Empire in 1763, it was already the centre of the North American Fur Trade. Over the course of the 19th century Montreal grew to become the economic centre of Canada as well as its most populous city.

=== Montreal and Toronto ===
Between the end of World War II and 1971, both Montreal and Toronto grew enormously in size. Between 1941 and 1951, Montreal's population grew by 20% and Toronto's by 25%. Between 1951 and 1961, Montreal grew by 35% and Toronto 45%. And from 1961 to 1971, Montreal grew by a little less than 20% and Toronto 30%. In the early 1970s, 30 years after Toronto had begun challenging Montreal as the economic capital of Canada, Toronto surpassed Montreal in size. Indeed, the volume of stocks traded at the Toronto Stock Exchange surpassed that traded at the Montreal Stock Exchange in the 1940s.

=== Recovery ===
During the 1980s and early 1990s, Montreal experienced a slower rate of economic growth than many other major Canadian cities. By the late 1990s, however, Montreal's economic climate had improved, as new firms and institutions began to fill the traditional business and financial niches. As the city celebrated its 350th anniversary in 1992, construction began on its two newest and largest skyscrapers: 1000 de La Gauchetière and 1250 René-Lévesque. Montreal's improving economic conditions allowed further enhancements of the city infrastructure, with the expansion of the metro system, construction of new skyscrapers and the development of new highways including the start of a ring road around the island. The city also attracted several international organizations towards moving their secretariats into Montreal's Quartier International.

=== Montréal's Economy in the 21st Century ===
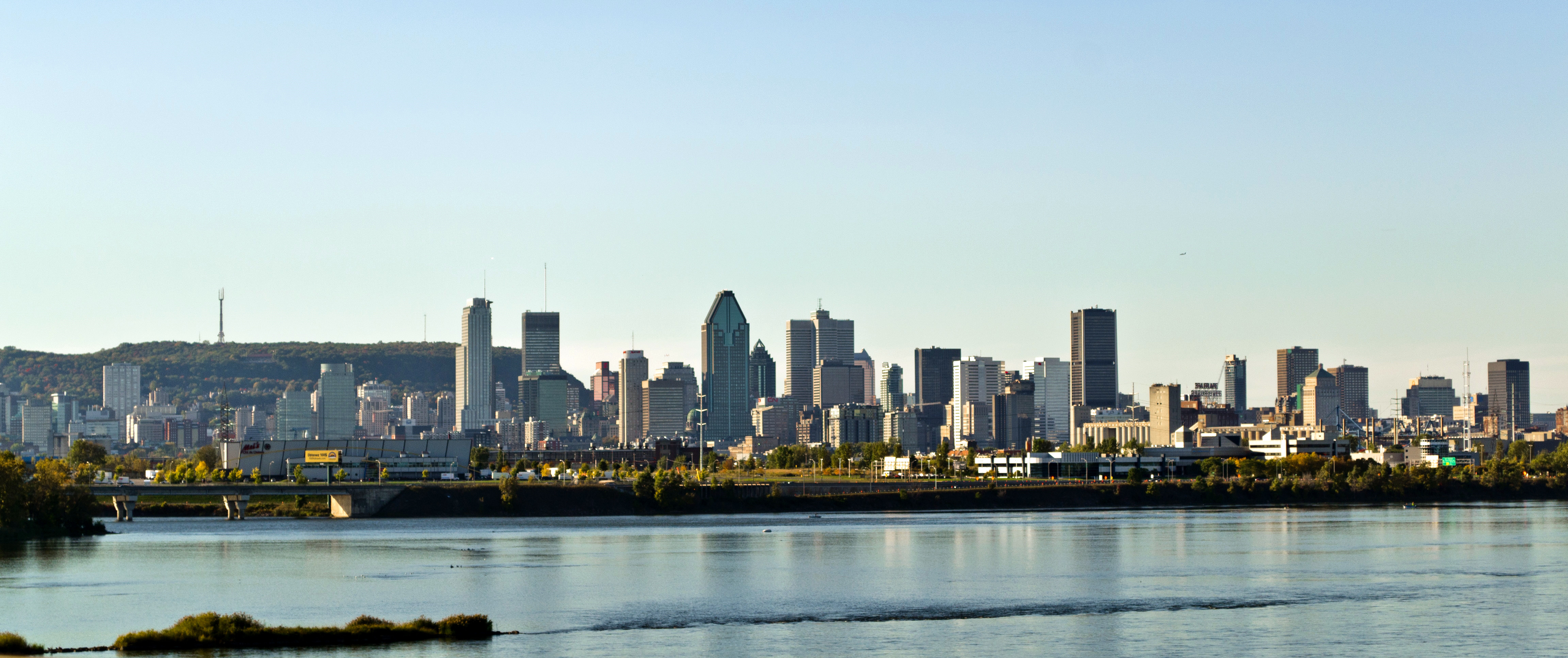
Montreal skyline

In the 21st century Montréal has adopted new strategies to develop its economy. The city invests largely in sustainable urban planning. In addition, Montréal plans on further integration with its surrounding municipalities. Metropolitan economic development: Vision and strategic principles for 2025 The 2018-2022 strategy plans on particularly promoting the knowledge and culture industry as well as the digital and bio-technological sector. Montréal's universities are at the forefront of Canada's growing research and development sector.Connection .

=== Economic Challenges ===
The COVID-19-pandemic has impacted Montréal's economy profoundly. The city experienced a -2,9% decrease in its GDP in 2020.The impact of the pandemic on Québec's economic sectors and GDP in 2020 Still, Montréal's labor market has been named the second most resilient in North America throughout the pandemic.Montréal: Second most resilient metropolitan economy in both Canada and the United States Office spaces in downtown have become increasingly vacant due to remote work. Montreal is at particular risk because of its capacity to pivot to these new developments. Reduced visitor traffic in the downtown area as well as an increase in E-commerce puts commercial spaces and cultural institutions at high risk. Many businesses have closed permanently, especially in the tourism sector. The impact of the pandemic on the downtown areas of Canada's six major cities The 2021 global inflation surge has also negatively impacted Montréal's economy. The Québec government has announced intentions to deploy an "Anti Inflation Shield". Update on Québec's Economic and Financial Situation - The Québec government is deploying the Anti-Inflation Shield to help Quebecers cope with the rising cost of living Gouvernement du Québec The city is suffering from an increasingly tense housing market. Gentrification in Plateau-Montréal and Mile End have added to the city's already existing ethno-cultural and socio-economic tensions.Montréal: Towards a post-industrial reinvention Montreal's plan to develop its knowledge economy has been under scrutiny in 2023. In order to preserve the cultural and linguistic roots of the region, the Québec government plans to increase tuition for out-of-province students. The obtained surplus is used to bolster francophone educational institutions. English speaking universities, primarily McGill and Concordia, have asked to review the plans. As of November 2023 the Québec government does not plan on changing their plans.

== Underground Economy ==
The black market, or underground economy, involves the illicit production and exchange and goods and services outside government-sanctioned channels. In 2021, Quebec comprised $15.5 Billion CDN of Canada's $68.5 Billion CDN GDP for underground economic activity. In the province of Quebec, particularly in Montreal, the primary black market is for dyed fuel and diesel oil. Dyed fuel is prohibited for use in motor vehicles, and restricted for use exclusively by farmers and fisherman. Other underground markets pervasive in Montreal are related to tobacco, gambling, and prostitution. In Quebec, approximately 40% of cigarettes consumed are illegally sourced. This is largely attributed to the high tobacco tax, which reached $37.80 CDN per cigarette carton as of February 2023. Studies conducted in 2007 indicate a positive correlation between the tax burden imposed and the prevalence of the underground economy. Consequently, high tax rates create a risk premium that justifies engaging in illicit market activities, leading some dealers in Montreal to openly advertise their services. Another example of an endemic underground market in Montreal is construction. Organized crime, notably associated with Nicolo Rizzuto, the founder of the Montreal-based Sicilian Mafia group known as the Rizzuto crime family, has reportedly infiltrated the Quebec Federation of Labor. This has resulted in the Rizzuto family obtaining various public construction contracts in Montreal. Their construction company, Grand Royal Asphalt Paving, won four municipal park contracts from 1963 to 1966, worth a reported $350,000 CDN.

=== History ===
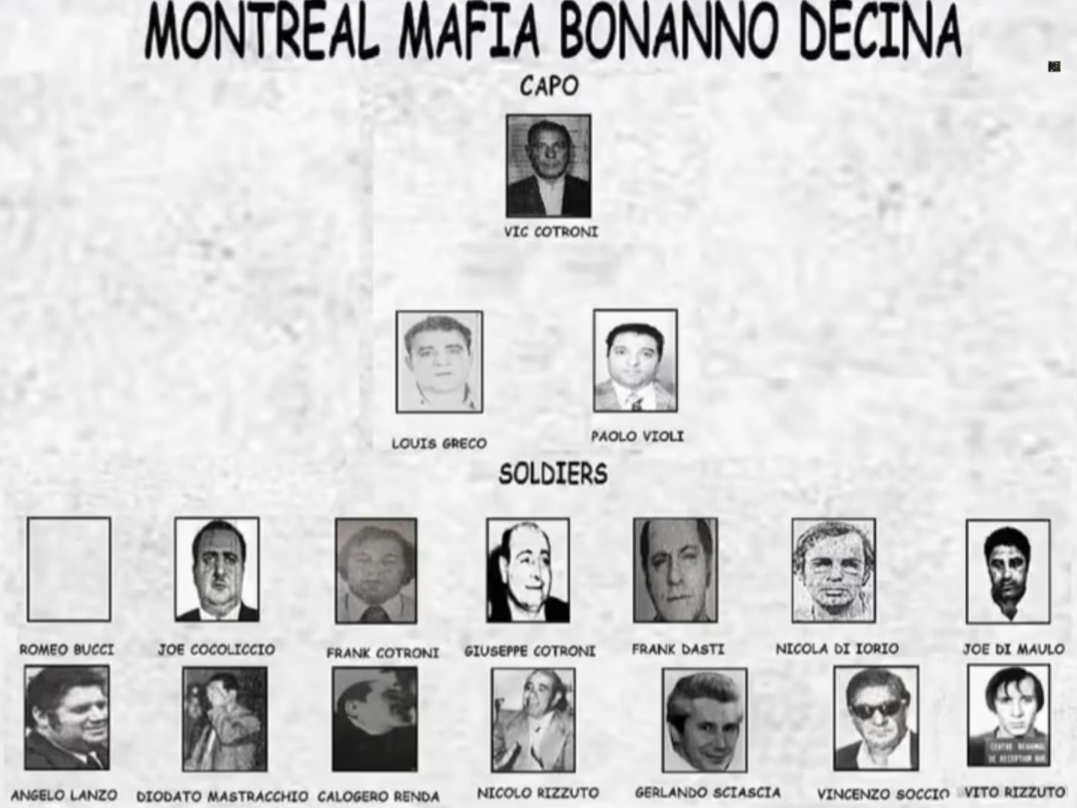
Montreal Mafia Bonanno Decina

Montreal's organised crime dates back to the early 1920s, when Vincenzo Cotroni immigrated to Montreal, Quebec. The Cotroni family were the first established Italian crime family in Montreal, and forged a strong connection during the 1950s with the Bonanno crime family. The Bonanno and Cotroni families worked together to oversee all of Montreal's drug trade. In 1973, an internal power struggle between the Sicilian and Calabrian factions of the family broke out and started the mafia war in Montreal. This war pitted the Rizzuto family against the Cotroni, and lasted for a decade. The war lasted for a decade, ending with the deaths of Paolo Violi and his brothers in the late 1970s. From the 1980s onwards, the Rizzuto family became the leading crime family of Montreal. Much of the reason behind organised crime in Montreal stem from the city's large seaport. Montreal's port represents a place where crime and economic activity intertwine. Illegal economy is part of international economic exchanges, meaning that all international hubs are of interest for crime families. Montreal's organised crime activity encompasses drug trafficking, illegal gambling, murder, loan sharking, extortion, racketeering and weapons trafficking. A report by the Canadian anti-corruption squad also linked organise crime to Montreal's construction industry and political parties. One of the UPAC showed that a "large number of Quebec construction businesses maintain links with criminal organisations", it additionally found that "it is impossible to evaluate the extent [...] we can suspect how much the mafia exerts a presence and its influence in the construction industry.".

=== Rizzuto Crime Family ===
After overtaking the Cotroni family in the mid-1970s, the Rizutto family has become the main crime family in Montreal. They exert influence over Quebec territory, as well as the province of Ontario. Nicolo Rizzuto immigrated to Montreal in 1954 from Sicily. He joined the Cotroni crime family, as the Sicilian faction of the organisation. Nicolo led the Sicilian faction during the 1970s mafia war and ousted the Cotroni family from power in 1980. However, in 1974 Nicolo had to flee to Venezuela after being asked to testify at CECO hearings. He appointed his son, Vito Rizzuto to take charge of the family's operations in Montreal. During the tensions between the two Montreal based families, Vito Rizzuto went to ask the approval of "The Commission" for the killing of Paolo Violi, a high-ranked member of the Cotroni crew. After the killings of many Cotroni members, and the murder of Violi in 1978, the Rizzuto family claimed their place as the leading organise crime family in Montreal. They consolidated ties with other crime groups across Canadian territory. The family was dubbed the Sixth Family, acknowledging their dominance and influence in Canadian, as well as their affiliation with the Five Families of Cosa Nostra in New York. Nicolo Rizzuto continued his illegal activities in Venezuela and expanded his family's allies internationally. He returned to Canada where he faced many charges and did time in prison, before being shot dead in 2010. Since, the Rizzuto crime family remains active in Quebec and Ontario, led by Nicolo's descendants.

== Key Industries ==
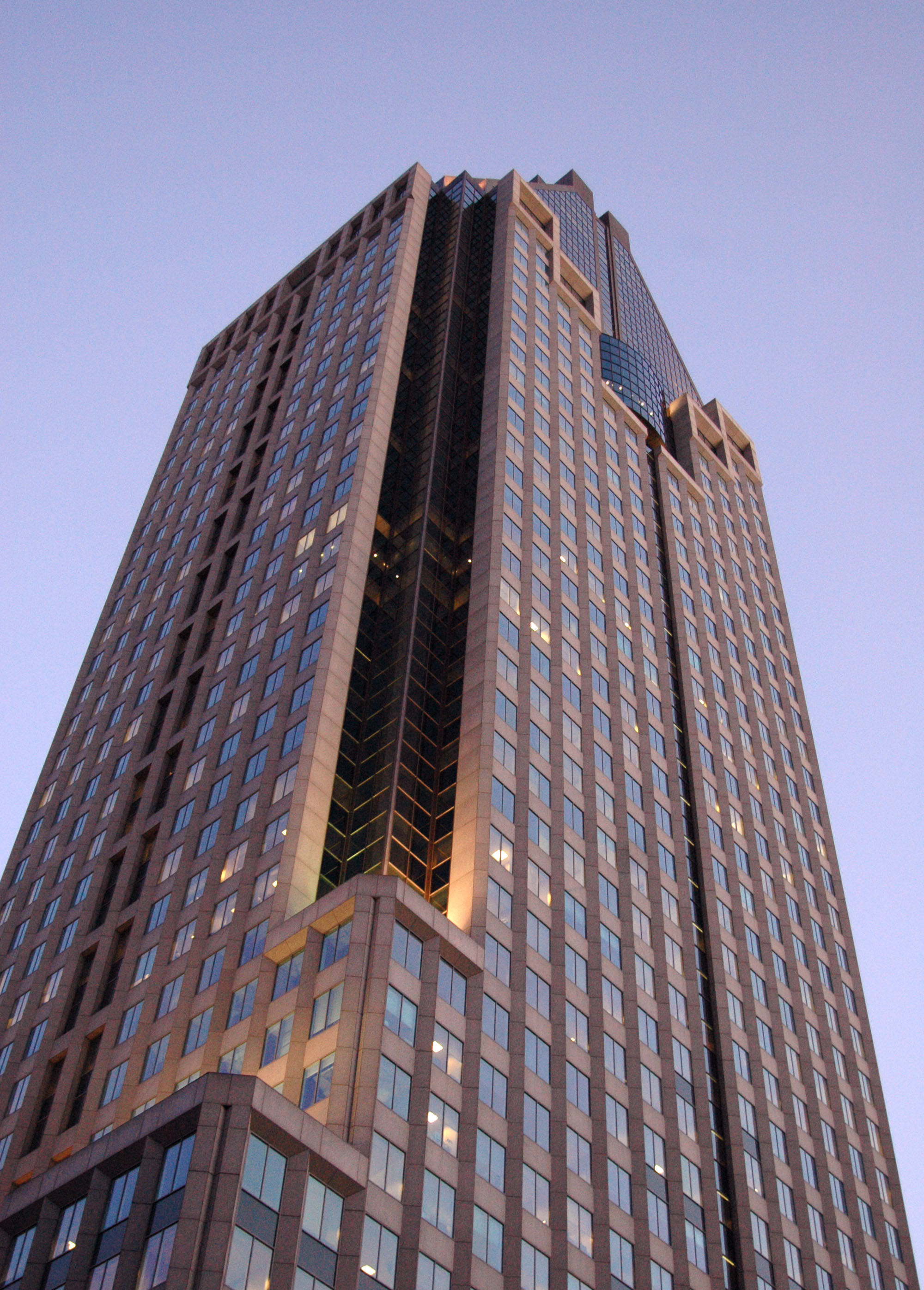
1000 de la Gauchetière

Montreal industries include aerospace, electronic goods, pharmaceuticals, printed goods, software engineering, telecommunications, textile and apparel manufacturing, tobacco, tourism and transportation. The service sector is also strong and includes civil, mechanical and process engineering, finance, higher education, and research and development. Montreal is now the 3rd largest aerospace centre in the world, after Toulouse and Seattle.

=== Port of Montreal ===
With 26 kilometers of coastline, the Port of Montreal is the largest inland port in the world and handles 39 million tonnes of cargo annually. As one of the most important ports in Canada, it remains a trans-shipment point for grain, sugar, petroleum products, machinery, and consumer goods. For this reason, Montreal is the railway hub of Canada and has always been an extremely important rail city; it is home to the headquarters of the Canadian National Railway, and was home to the headquarters of the Canadian Pacific Railway until 1995.

=== Artificial intelligence ===
Montreal is a global hub for artificial intelligence research with many companies involved in this sector, such as Facebook AI Research (FAIR), Microsoft Research, Google Brain, DeepMind, Samsung Research, and Thales Group.(cortAIx). A notable Montreal AI start-up is Element AI. Element AI is co-founded by Université de Montréal professor Yoshua Bengio, who won the Turing Award in 2018 for his contributions to deep learning.

Growing alongside Montreal's AI industry is a cloud computing sector which takes advantage of the city's IT talent pool, lower electricity rates, and proximity to the US. Google opened a cloud data centre in Montreal in 2017, its first in Canada, following the steps of Amazon, IBM, and Bell. Locally headquartered, middle-market cloud computing businesses also flourish in Montreal—like Ormuco Inc., a former cloud managed service provider which now also develops platforms for 5G mobile app development, reflecting a wider regional industry shift towards edge computing.

=== Video games ===
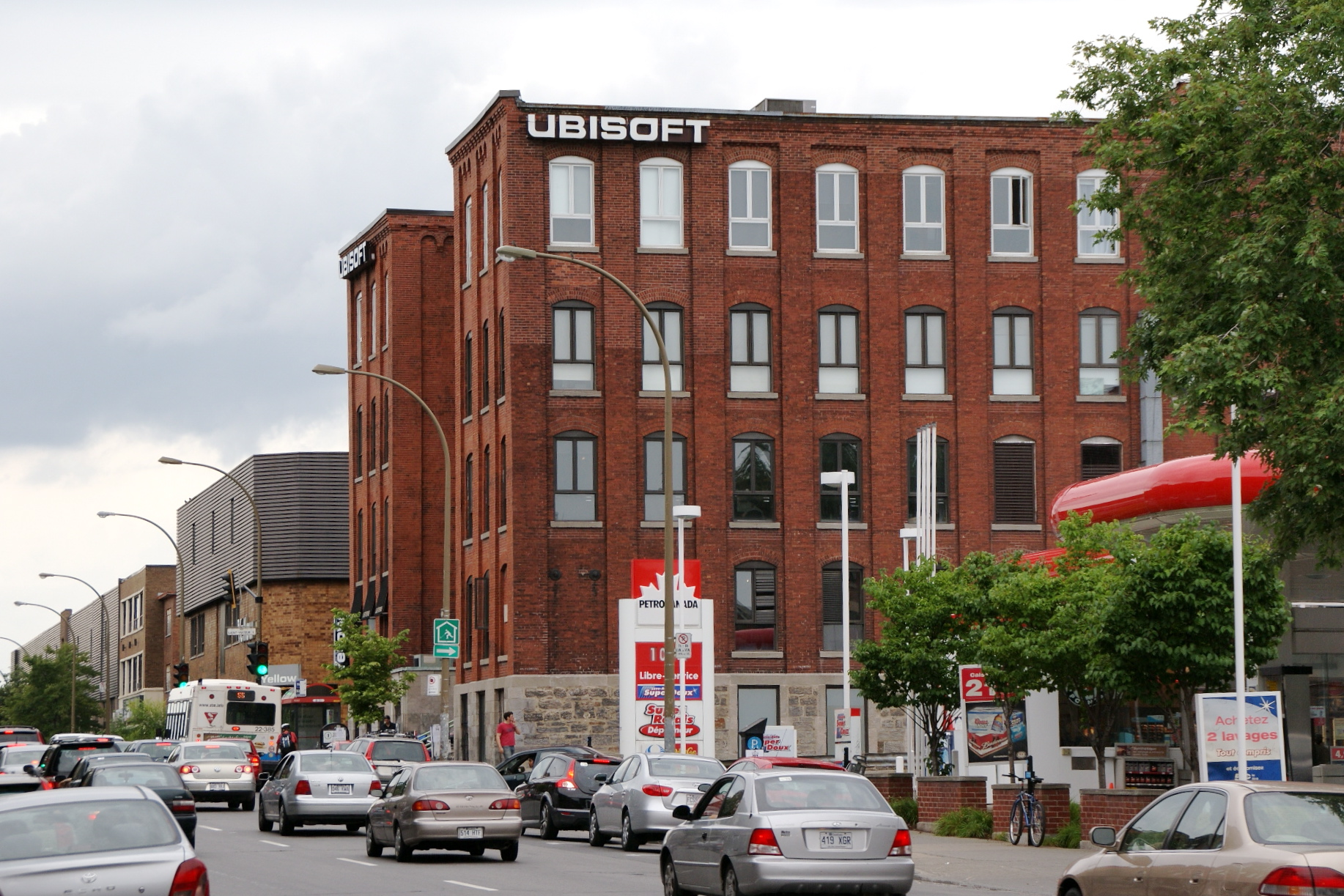
Ubisoft Montreal

The video game industry is also growing rapidly in Montreal since 1997, coinciding with the opening of Ubisoft Montreal. Recently, the city has attracted world leading game developers and publishers studios such as Ubisoft, EA, Eidos Interactive, Artificial Mind and Movement, BioWare, and Strategy First, mainly because video games jobs have been heavily subsidized by the provincial government. Every year, this industry generates billions of dollars and thousands of jobs in the Montreal area. According to the economic development organization Montréal International, Montreal is now ranked 5th in the world for video games.

=== Arts and Culture ===
Montreal is also a centre of film and television production. Five studios of the Academy Award-winning documentary producer National Film Board of Canada can be found here, as well as the head offices of Telefilm Canada, the national feature-length film and television funding agency. Given its eclectic architecture and broad availability of film services and crew members, Montreal is a popular filming location for feature-length films, and sometimes stands in for European locations. The city is also home to many recognized cultural, film and music festivals (Just For Laughs, Montreal Jazz Festival, and others), which contribute significantly to its economy. It is also home to one of the world's largest cultural enterprises, the Cirque du Soleil.

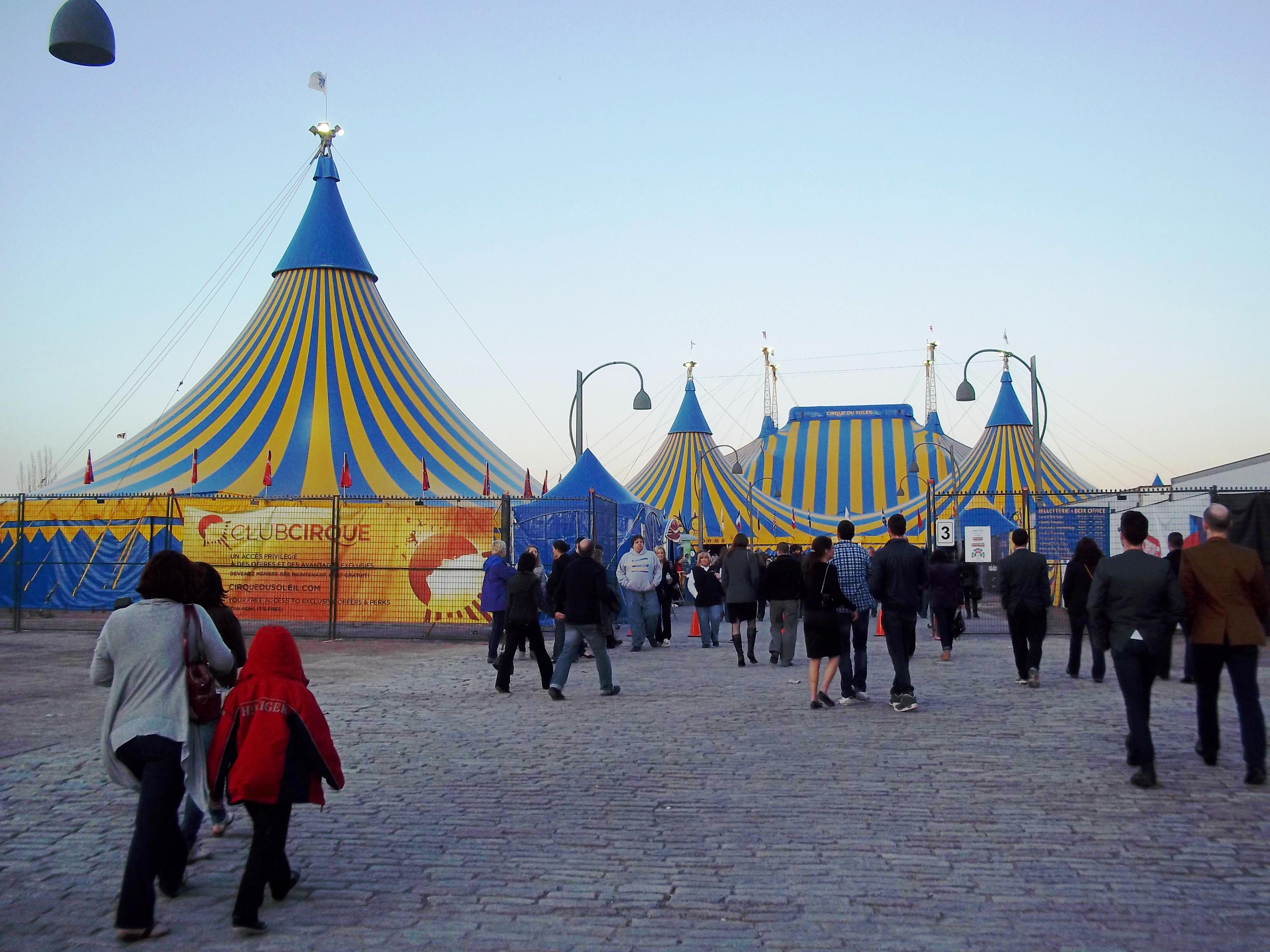
Cirque du Soleil tent in the old port of Montreal

In 2006 Montreal was named a UNESCO City of Design, only one of three design capitals of the world (with the others being Berlin and Buenos Aires). This distinguished title recognizes Montreal's design community. Since 2005 the city has also been home for the International Council of Graphic Design Associations (Icograda), and the International Design Alliance (IDA).

The cultural sector is responsible for 6% of Montreal's GDP and 4.1% of all jobs in Montreal. In 2013, the cultural sector provided 82,740 direct jobs and 48,199 indirect jobs, for a total of 130,949 jobs. The cultural sector was estimated at 10.7 billion dollars in 2013.

== Organizational and Corporate Headquarters ==
The headquarters of the Canadian Space Agency are located in Longueuil, directly east of Montreal across the Saint Lawrence River. Montreal also hosts the headquarters of the International Civil Aviation Organization (ICAO, a United Nations body); the World Anti-Doping Agency (an Olympic body); the International Air Transport Association (IATA); and the International Gay and Lesbian Chamber of Commerce (IGLCC), as well as some 60 other international organizations in various fields (See below).

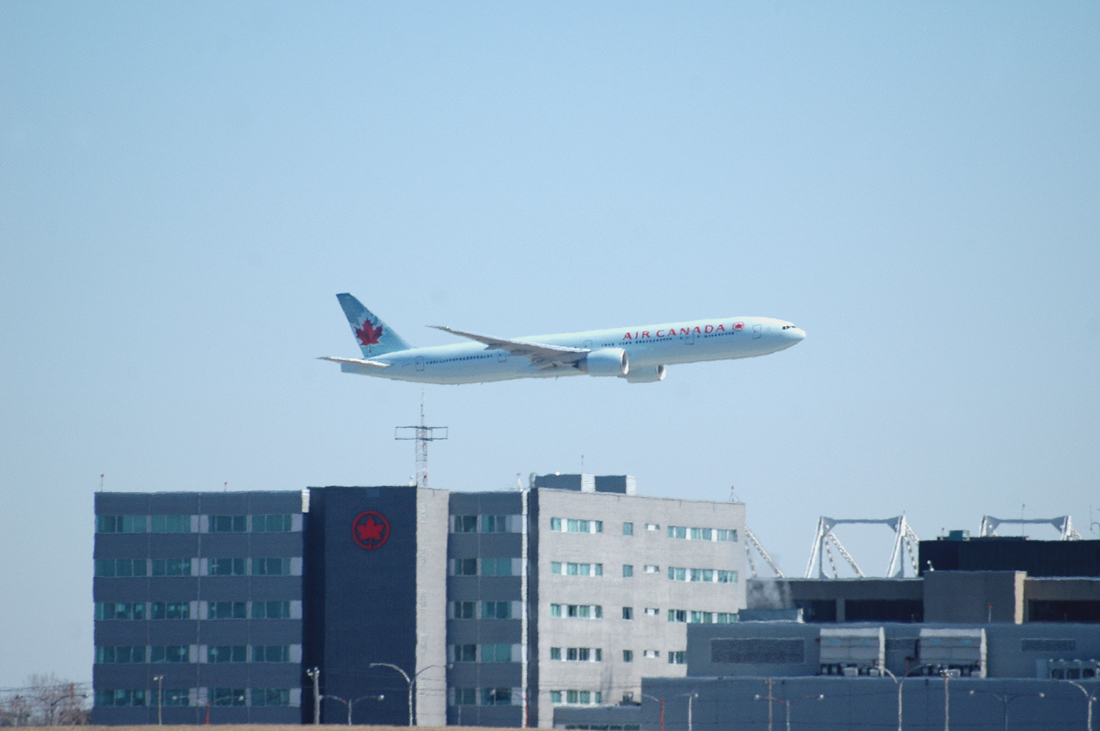
Air Canada Centre (French: Centre Air Canada), the headquarters of Air Canada

Several companies are headquartered in Greater Montreal including:

=== Passenger Transport, loyalty programs, and tour operators ===
- Air Canada - Airline (Canada's largest)
- Air Transat - Airline
- Air Inuit
- Via Rail
- Aimia (company)
- Transat A.T.

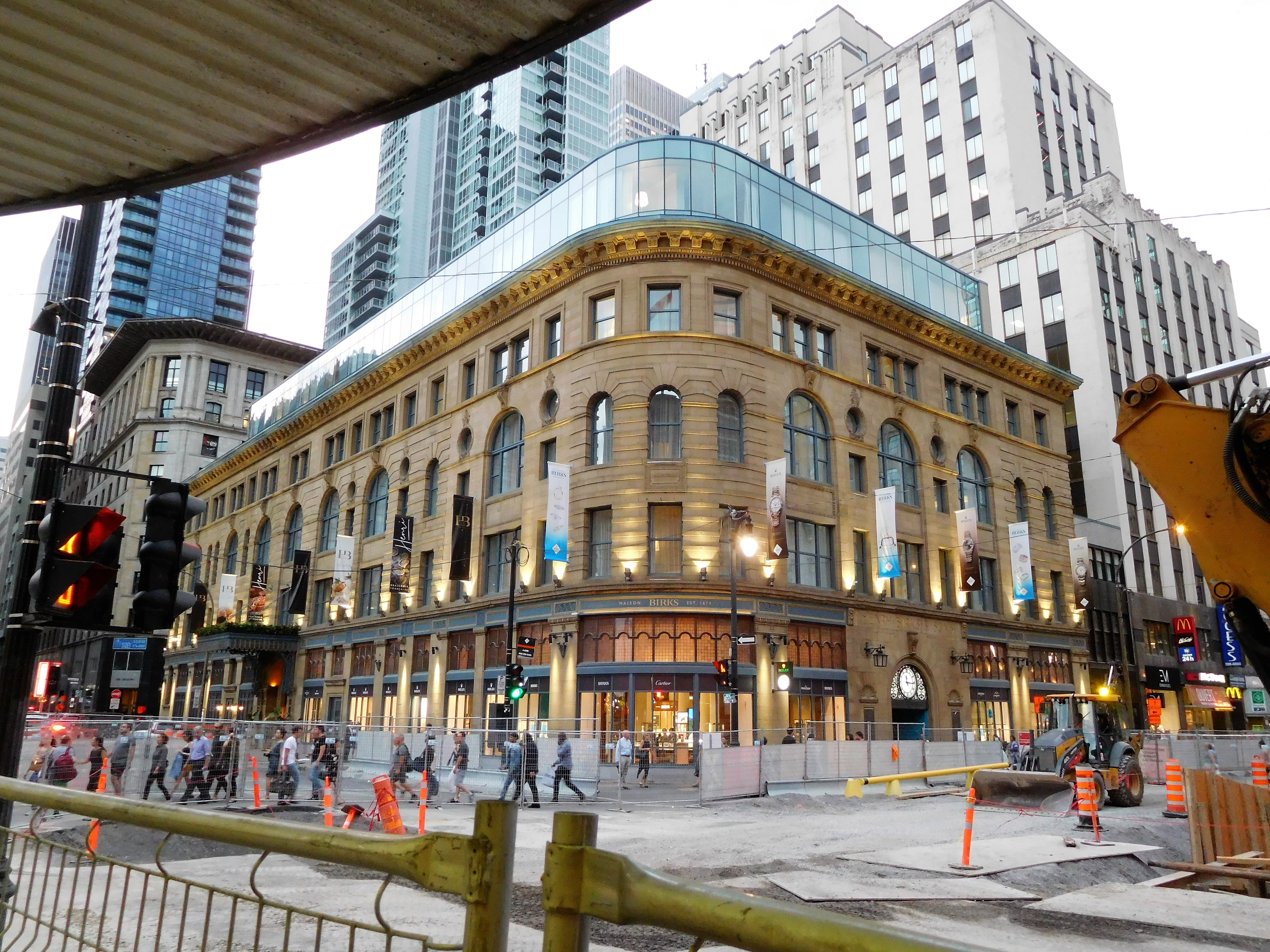
Birks Group's flagship store at Phillips Square in Montreal. The building was renovated in 2001.

=== Retail and restaurants ===
- Aldo Group
- Alimentation Couche-Tard - Convenience store operator (Largest in Canada)
- Birks Group
- Dollarama
- Metro Inc.
- MTY Food Group
- Reitmans
- Structube

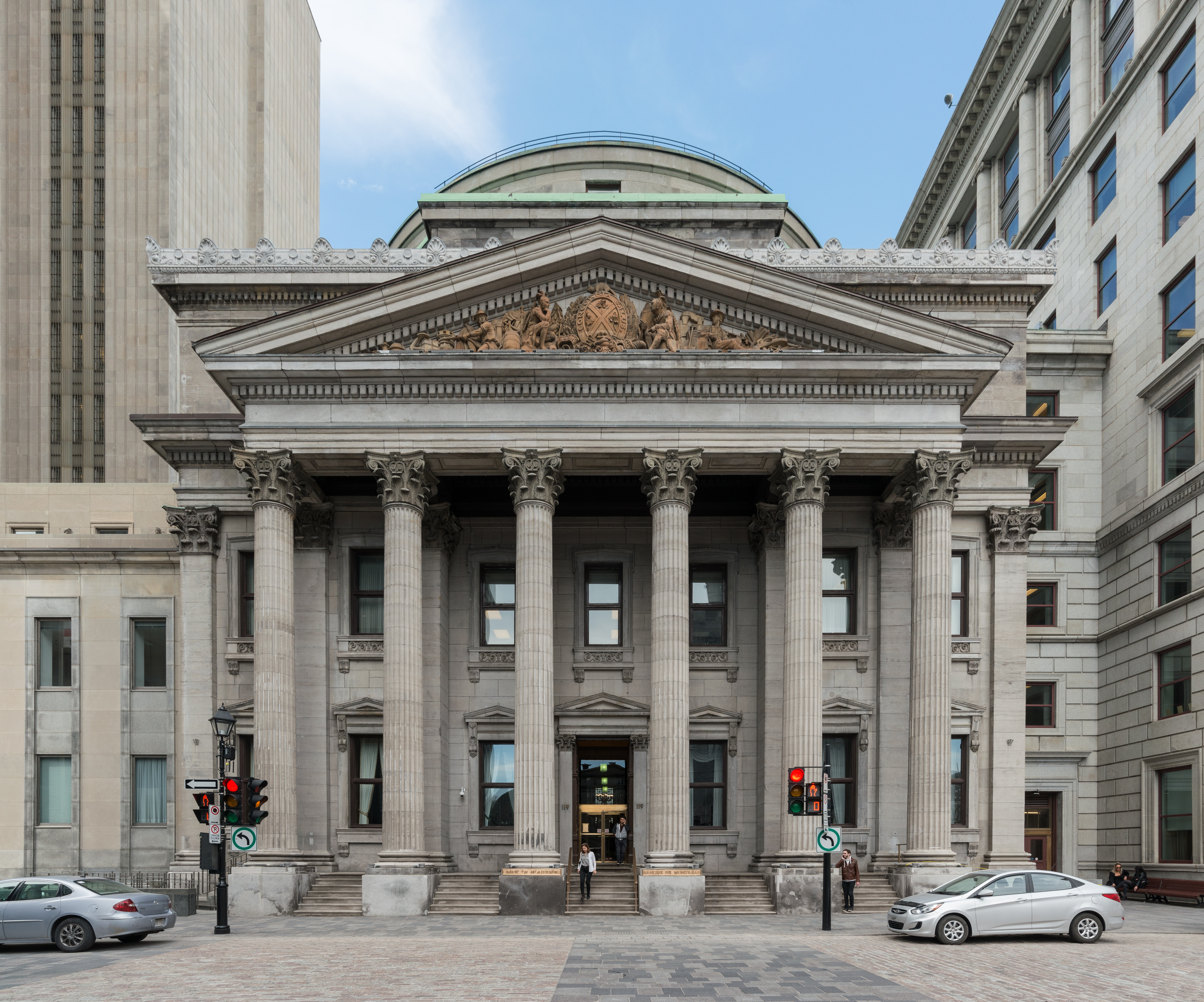
A southeast view of the Bank of Montreal's head office, Montréal

=== Finance ===
- Bank of Montreal (legal head office, operational headquarters in Toronto)
- Desjardins Group (operational headquarters, legal head office is in Levis, Quebec)
- Laurentian Bank
- National Bank of Canada
- Power Corporation
- Royal Bank Of Canada (legal head office, operational headquarters in Toronto)

=== Utilities and media ===
- Bell Canada (Telecommunications and Media) - Global HQ
- Hydro-Québec
- Quebecor

=== E-commerce and Information Technology ===
- Beyond the Rack - E-Commerce, Flash Sales
- CGI Group (Information technology) - Global HQ
- Lightspeed - Point of sale software, E-Commerce
- Nuvei - Payments infrastructure software, E-Commerce

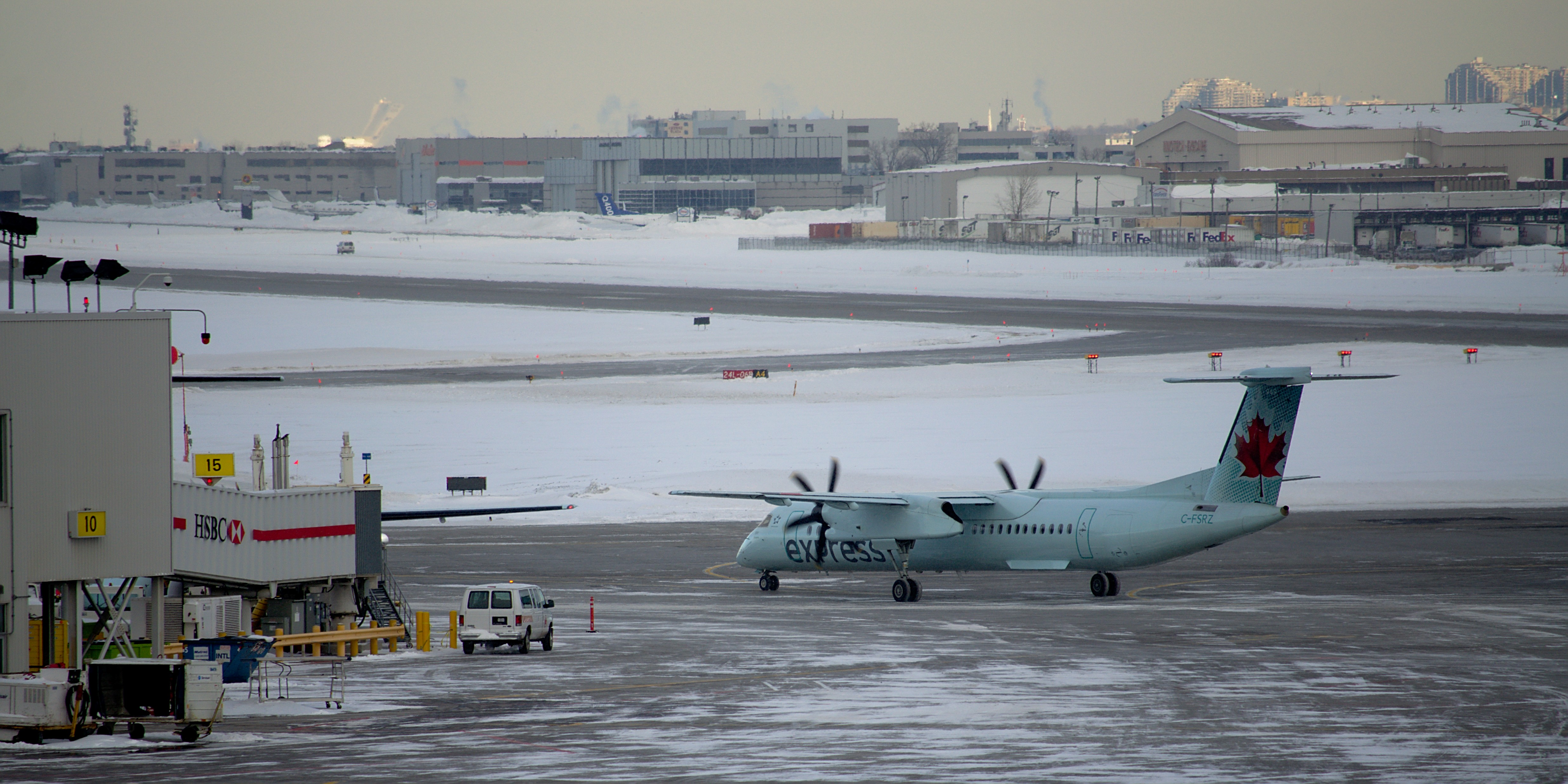
Bombardier Q400 at Montreal international Airport

=== Aerospace ===
- Bombardier Inc. (Aircraft manufacturing, mass transportation equipment manufacturing and financial services provider) - Global HQ
- CAE
- Pratt and Whitney Canada
- Airbus Canada Limited Partnership

=== Freight transport ===
- Canada Steamship Lines
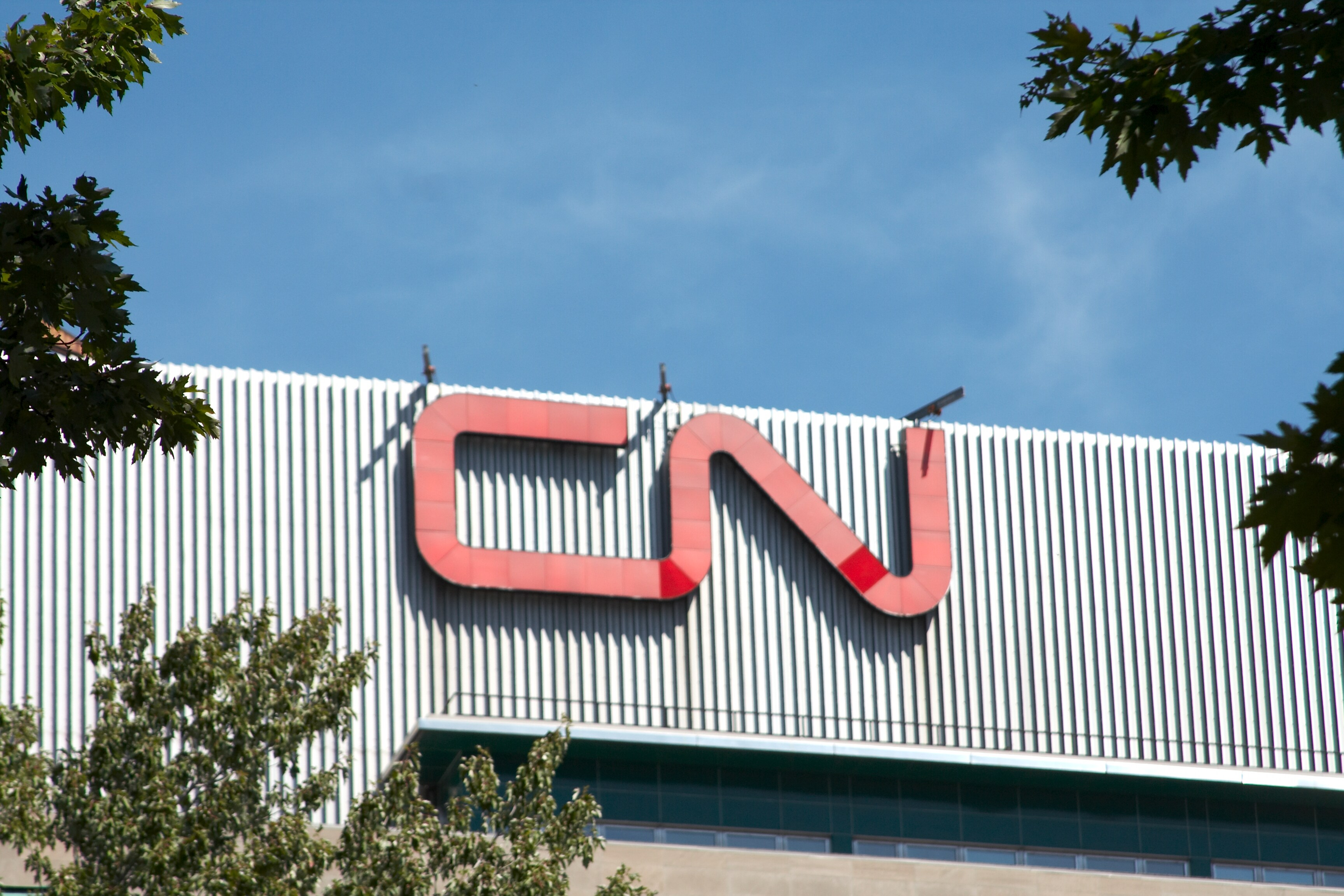
- Canadian National Railway Headquarters in Montreal
  Canadian National Railway
- TFI International

=== Sporting equipment and toys ===
- CCM (bicycle company)
- CCM (ice hockey)
- MEGA Brands

=== Arts ===
- CinéGroupe
- Cirque du Soleil
- Toon Boom Animation

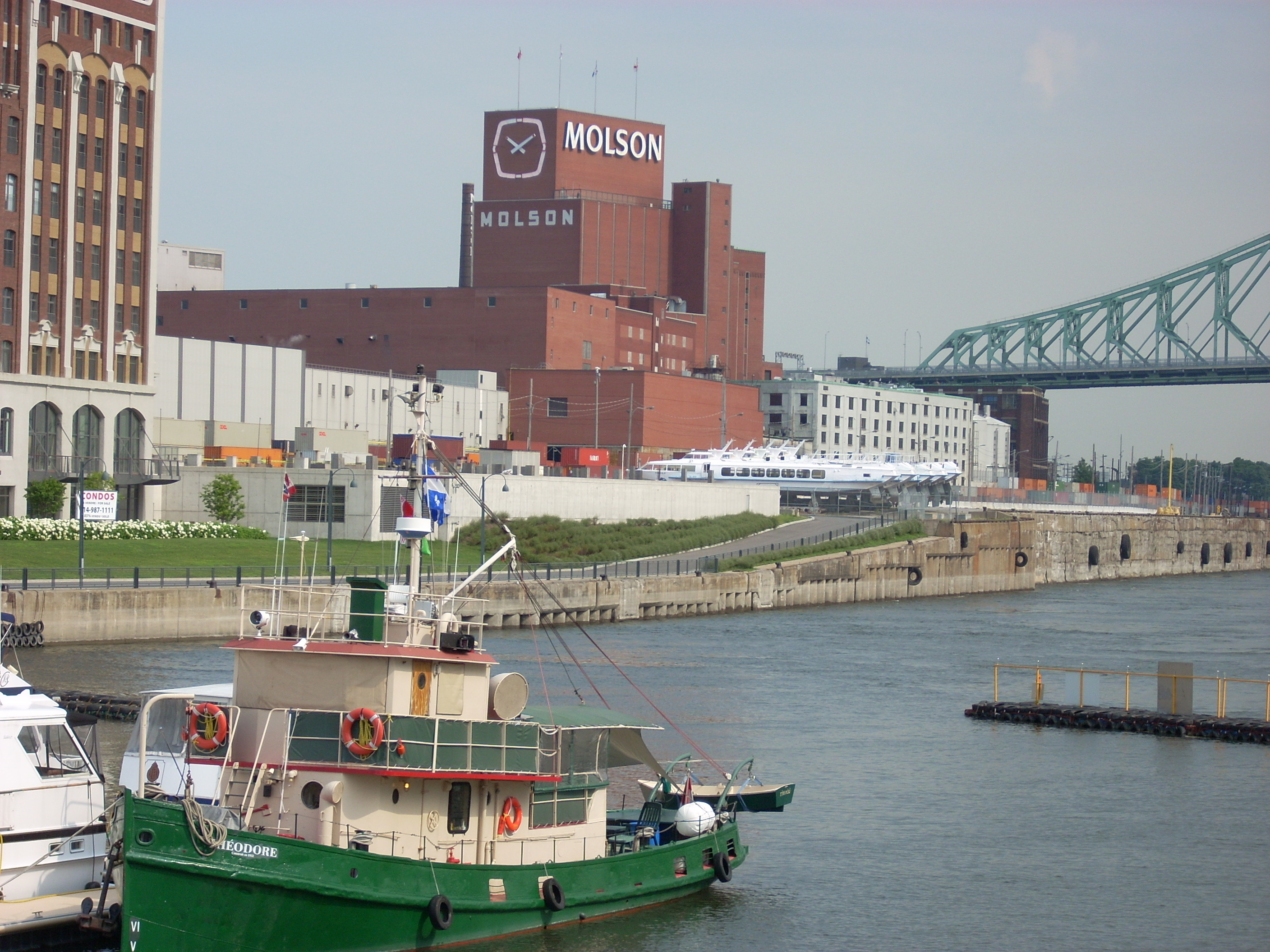
Molson Canadian beer making headquarters as seen from Old Montreal.

=== Food and beverage ===
- Molson
- Saputo

=== Engineering firms ===
- SNC-Lavalin,
- WSP Global

=== Natural resources ===
- Domtar
- Kruger Inc.
- Resolute Forest Products
- Rio Tinto Alcan
- Stella-Jones
- Targray - Supplier of materials and consumables for the international Solar, Energy Storage, and Biofuels industries.
- Tembec

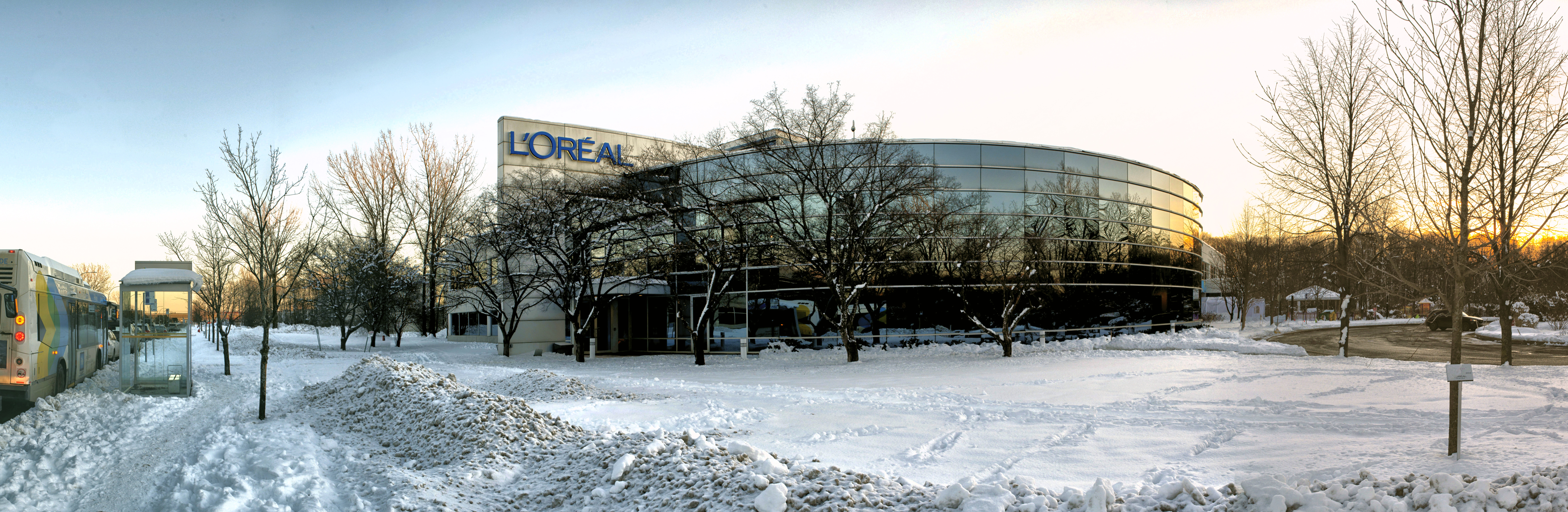
L'Oreal Canadian distribution centre, Saint-Laurent, Montreal

=== Pharmaceuticals and personal care ===
- Bausch Health
- L'Oréal Canada
- Merck Canada Inc.
- Novartis Canada
- Pfizer Canada
- Pharmascience

== See also ==
- Board of Trade of Metropolitan Montreal
- Economy of Quebec
- Montréal International
- Greater Montreal
- Economy of Toronto
