= Mohamed Lachemi =

University President

Mohamed Lachemi OOnt
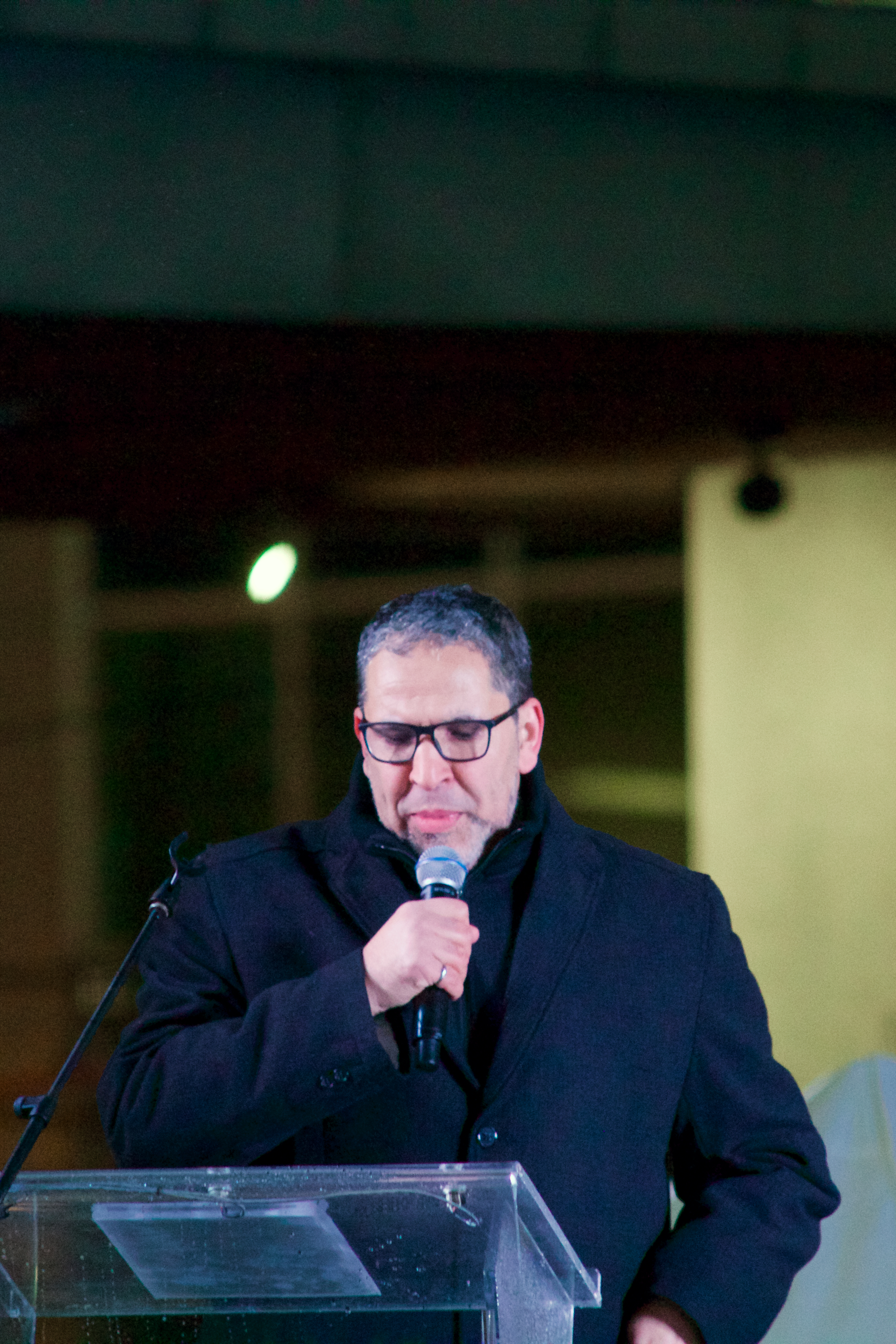
- Lachemi in 2018

9th President and Vice-Chancellor of Toronto Metropolitan University
- Incumbent
- Assumed office 30 September 2016
- Preceded by: Sheldon Levy

Personal details
- Born: 1962 (age 63–64) Algeria
- Children: 4
- Education: Université des Sciences et de la Technologie d'Oran; Université de Sherbrooke (MASc, PhD)

Mohamed Lachemi OOnt (born 1962) is an Algerian–Canadian academic and administrator, currently serving as the president and vice-chancellor of Toronto Metropolitan University (formerly Ryerson University). He was first appointed in 2016 and reappointed to a second term concluding in 2026. Right after Lachemi, Roberta Inannacito-Provenzano took place as Lachemi's successor in April 2026, with her term beginning January 2027.

== Education ==
Lachemi earned his undergraduate degree in civil engineering from l'Université des Sciences et de la Technologie d'Oran in Algeria and completed his Master of Applied Science (MASc) and PhD in Structural Engineering at L'Université de Sherbrooke in Canada.

== Professional Contributions ==
=== Research ===
As a researcher, Lachemi specializes in the development of high-performance materials and advanced technologies in construction. His work focuses on the behaviour of concrete structures and minimizing the environmental impact of building construction.

Lachemi held a Canada Research Chair in Sustainable Construction from 2002 to 2010. His research has been funded by various organizations, including the Canada Foundation for Innovation, Ontario Innovation Trust, Natural Sciences and Engineering Research Council, Ontario Centres of Excellence, the Ontario Ministry of Transportation, Hydro-Québec and various industrial partners.

=== Toronto Metropolitan University ===
Lachemi began as a professor of civil engineering in 1998. He was appointed dean of the faculty of engineering and architectural science in 2010 after serving as interim dean the year prior. In 2013, he began his role as the provost and vice-president, academic, which he held until becoming president and vice-chancellor in 2016.

Since becoming president, Lachemi has overseen the establishment of new schools in law and medicine, with a focus on technology, equity and inclusion, and a mandate to reach underserved populations.

Under his direction, Toronto Metropolitan University launched the Rogers Cybersecure Catalyst, a national centre for cybersecurity, and was awarded leadership of the Future Skills Centre consortium, which aims to ensure Canadians develop the skills they need in the new economy.

Lachemi also formed a new Presidential Implementation Committee to Confront Anti-Black Racism, tasked with helping to implement recommendations included in the university’s Anti-Black Racism Campus Climate Review Report. He also established and co-chaired the Standing Strong Task Force to address the legacy of the university’s namesake, Egerton Ryerson. This initiative resulted in the decision to rename the university, implement recommendations to enhance support for Indigenous and Black scholarship, and a commitment to establish learning programs for students, faculty and staff on indigenous history and the Indian Residential School System.

=== Professional Affiliations ===
Lachemi previously held roles as the Chair of the Council of Ontario Universities, Chair of the Finance Committee of Universities Canada, Fellow of the Canadian Society for Civil Engineering, and Fellow of the Canadian Academy of Engineering.

In addition, he serves on the Board of Directors for Trillium Health Partners, Rogers Communications Inc., and DMZ Ventures. He was a member of the National Research Council from 2018 to 2021.

=== Awards and honours ===
Lachemi has been recognized as one of the city’s Top 50 Most Influential People by Toronto Life Magazine (2021 and 2022), Canada’s Top 25 Immigrants by Canadian Immigrant Magazine (2022), and as one of LinkedIn Top Voices, Education (2019). He was awarded a Doctor of Laws, honoris causa, by Ontario Tech University (2021), and received the Order of Ontario in 2022. Lachemi was also recognized with the Ontario Professional Engineers Awards (OPEA) Gold Medal in 2026.
