= Sheldon Levy =

Canadian academic administrator and civil servant

Sheldon Levy OC
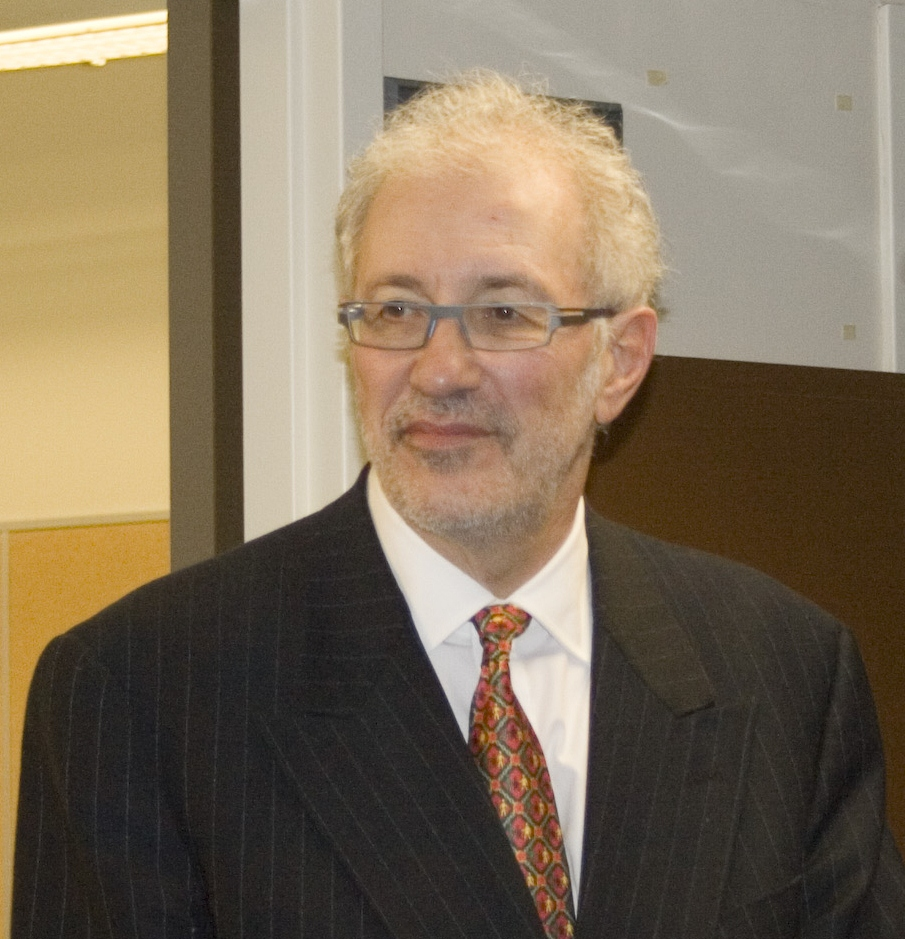
- Levy in 2008

Special Advisor to the Minister of Small Business and Export Promotion
- In office December 2018 – September 2021

President and Vice-Chancellor of University Canada West
- In office 2021 – 2023
- Preceded by: Brock Dykeman
- Succeeded by: Bashir Makhoul

Ontario Deputy Minister of Training, Colleges and Universities
- In office December 1, 2015 – September 30, 2017
- Preceded by: Deborah Newman
- Succeeded by: Greg Orencsak

8th President and Vice-Chancellor of Ryerson University
- In office 2005–2016
- Chancellor: John Craig Eaton II; G. Raymond Chang; Lawrence Bloomberg
- Preceded by: Claude Lajeunesse
- Succeeded by: Mohamed Lachemi

4th President and Vice-Chancellor of Sheridan College
- In office 1997 – 2001
- Preceded by: Mary E. Hofstetter
- Succeeded by: Robert Turner

Personal details
- Born: 1949 (age 76–77)
- Education: York University
- Occupation: CEO, educational administrator, civil servant

Sheldon Levy OC (born 1949) is a Canadian executive and academic administrator. He served as president and vice-chancellor of Toronto Metropolitan University (then Ryerson University) from 2005 to 2015 and as Deputy Minister in the Ontario Ministry of Training, Colleges and Universities from 2015 to 2017, among other roles. He currently serves as a special advisor on the development of the forthcoming University of Niagara Falls.

== Life and career ==
=== Education ===
Levy studied at Downsview Public and Secondary School, in Toronto, and earned his master's degree in mathematics from York University.

=== Early career ===
Levy began his career in university administration shortly after completing his degree in mathematics and held numerous roles including Vice president, institutional affairs, at York University; President of Sheridan College of Applied Arts and Technology; Vice president, government and institutional relations, at the University of Toronto; and Vice president, finance and strategy, at Ontario Tech University (formerly University of Ontario Institute of Technology).

=== Toronto Metropolitan University ===
In 2005 Levy was appointed president and vice chancellor of Ryerson University (now Toronto Metropolitan University). He served in the role from 1 August 2005 through 30 November 2015. His tenure was marked by a number of campus revitalization projects, including the establishment of the Mattamy Athletic Centre in the former Maple Leaf Gardens building and the construction of the Student Learning Centre on Yonge Street.

=== Subsequent positions ===
In December 2015, Levy was appointed Deputy Minister of Training, Colleges and Universities for the Government of Ontario, a position he held until September 2017. He then served as CEO of NEXT Canada from November 2017 to December 2018 and as special advisor to the Minister of Small Business and Export Promotion, the Honourable Mary Ng, from December 2018 to September 2021.

In September 2021, Levy was announced as the interim president and vice-chancellor of UCW, replacing Brock Dykeman. By March 2022, he was appointed as the permanent president and vice-chancellor of the school. The university announced that Levy would be staying on in 2023. In addition to his role at UCW, Levy has also been named as a special advisor in the development of University Niagara Falls Canada.

Levy is also a strategic consultant and special advisor to Knightstone Capital Management Inc.

=== Board appointments ===
Levy is a member of the board of directors of Baycrest Health Sciences. His previous board appointments have included the Toronto Region Board of Trade, Waterfront Toronto and the Innovation Institute of Ontario. He also served as honorary chair of the Brookfield Institute Advisory Board.

=== Personal life ===
Levy is a known motorcycle enthusiast. Ryerson University Magazine reported in its winter 2015 issue that Levy “likes to go on trips that last for days and that don't have any precise destination.” He rode his motorcycle across central and western Canada, from Toronto to Vancouver, in the summer of 2022.

== Awards and honours ==
=== Order of Canada ===
In November 2020, Levy was amongst 114 new appointments to the Order of Canada as an appointed Officer, “for his exceptional leadership as an education administrator and for promoting student entrepreneur incubators on university campuses across the country.”

=== Honorary doctorates ===
Levy has been bestowed three honorary doctorates in the past from three Canadian universities, including:

- A Doctor of Laws (LLD) from York University in 1999.
- A Doctor of Education (Ed.D.) from Lakehead University in 2018.
- A Doctor of Laws (LLD) from Mount Allison University in 2019.

== Accolades ==
An article by Toronto Life magazine, called the "Ryerson Revolution", describes in detail how Levy has taken the initiative since starting as president to improve Ryerson University, by purchasing Maple Leaf Gardens, shutting down Gould Street and a space sharing agreement with AMC Theatres, creating an urban campus, instead of the more traditional closed-off university campus.

Levy was one of the driving forces behind the Digital Media Zone (DMZ) which opened in April 2010. It is a multidisciplinary workspace for research and learning, home to both entrepreneurial companies and industry solution-providers. With access to business services, contacts, entrepreneurs, and researchers which all accelerate product launches, and contribute to Canada's digital economy.

In 2015, Levy was the subject of a viral video produced by Ryerson University custodian Bob Skelly.

== Controversies ==
In 2006, Levy sparked controversy by defending the decision of Ryerson's Awards and Ceremonials Standing Committee of the Academic Council to award an honorary degree to Margaret Somerville, who is noted for her opposition to same-sex marriage and gay families. He explained that while Ryerson University did not agree with Dr. Somerville's views, revoking the award would be counter to freedom of speech and the right to expression.

In 2008, as part of a heritage preservation agreement for the construction of the Student Learning Centre on Yonge Street, Ryerson agreed to preserve the Sam the Record Man sign that had been located on the site. When the university later proposed to install smaller replica signs on Yonge Street instead, Levy and the university were criticized for attempting to change the original agreement. In 2017 the original sign was re-installed above 277 Victoria Street, steps from its original location.

Academic offices
Preceded by Claude Lajeunesse	President of Ryerson University; 2005–2015	Succeeded by Mohamed Lachemi
Preceded by Brock Dykeman	President and Vice-Chancellor of University Canada West; 2021-Present	Succeeded by
