= Großpetersdorf =

- Municipality
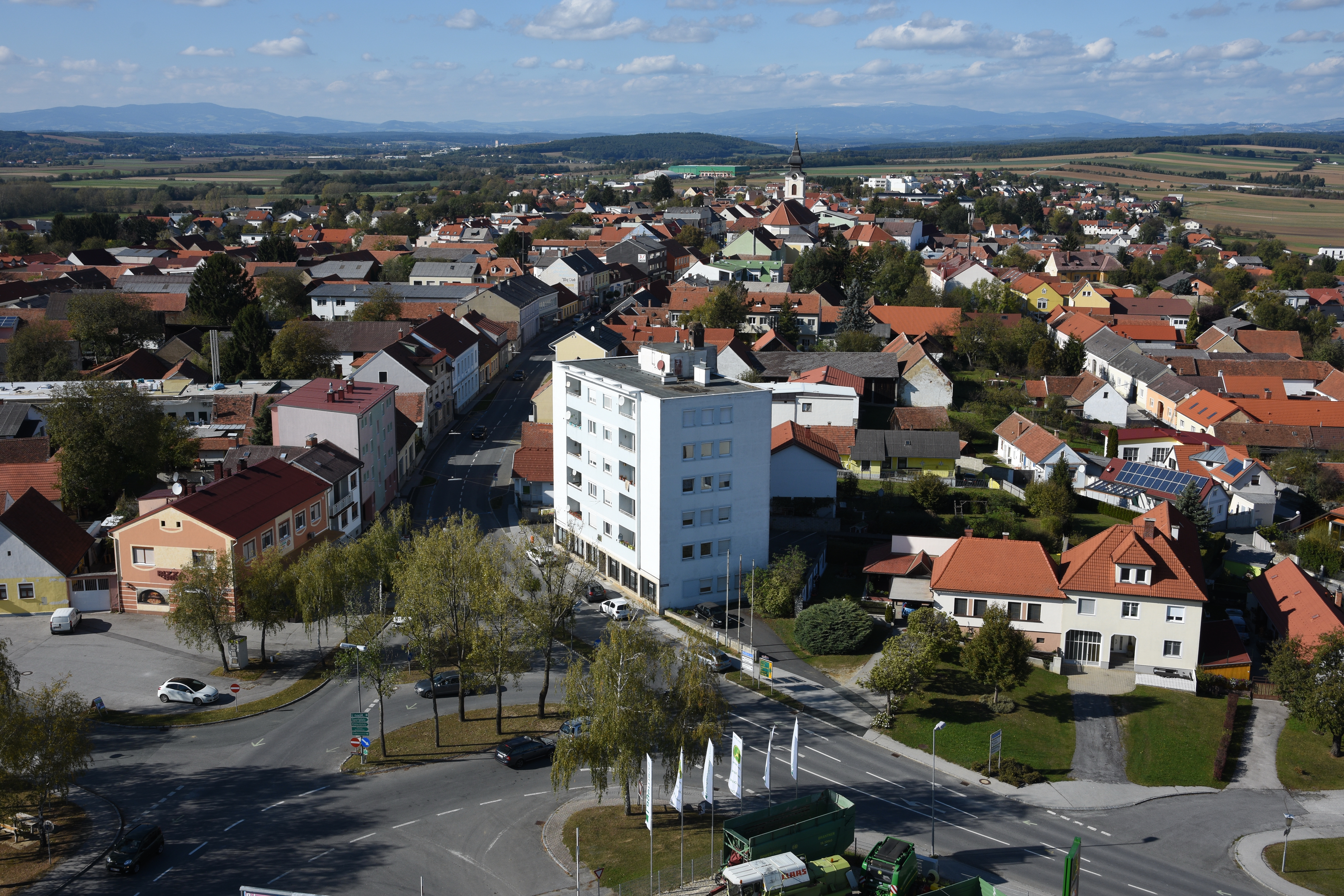

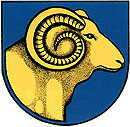
- Coat of arms

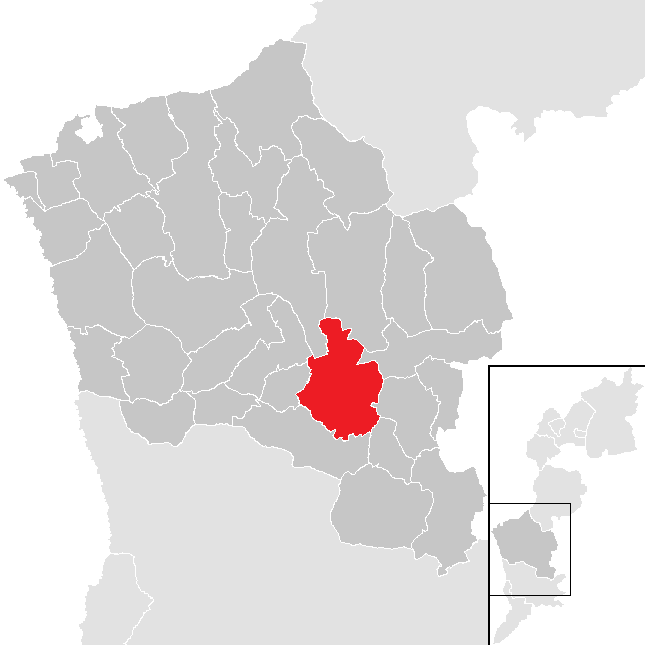
- Location within Oberwart district

- Location within Austria
- Coordinates: 47°14′N 16°19′E
- Country: Austria
- State: Burgenland
- District: Oberwart

Government
  - Mayor: Wolfgang Tauss

Area
  - Total: 31.36 km^{2} (12.11 sq mi)
- Elevation: 311 m (1,020 ft)

Population (2018-01-01)
  - Total: 3,531
  - Density: 112.6/km^{2} (291.6/sq mi)
- Time zone: UTC+1 (CET)
  - Summer (DST): UTC+2 (CEST)
- Postal code: 7503
- Website: www.grosspetersdorf.at

Großpetersdorf (Hungarian: Nagyszentmihály) is a municipality in Burgenland in the district of Oberwart in Austria.

== Geography ==
The municipality is composed of Großpetersdorf, Kleinpetersdorf, Kleinzicken, Miedlingsdorf, and Welgersdorf.

== Population ==
Historical population
Year	Pop.	±%
1869	3,485	—
1880	3,509	+0.7%
1890	3,663	+4.4%
1900	3,574	−2.4%
1910	3,531	−1.2%
1923	3,173	−10.1%
1934	3,080	−2.9%
1939	2,926	−5.0%
1951	2,967	+1.4%
1961	3,059	+3.1%
1971	3,384	+10.6%
1981	3,586	+6.0%
1991	3,614	+0.8%
2001	3,546	−1.9%
2011	3,550	+0.1%

== Politics ==
Of the 25 positions on the municipal council, the SPÖ has 15, and the ÖVP 10.

== Culture ==
- Catholic parish church Grosspetersdorf
- Protestant parish church Grosspetersdorf
- Lucky Town, a staged little western city in Grosspetersdorf, which is opened for visitors every Monday from June to August.

== Personalities ==
- Frederick Lowy, Canadian psychiatrist, medical educator and president and vice-chancellor of Concordia University

In 2026 testing revealed elevated Asbestos levels on a Großpetersdorf gravel road.
