= Miedlingsdorf =

Coordinates: 47°15′53″N 16°19′07″E

Miedlingsdorf is an Austrian village in the district of Oberwart in the state of Burgenland.

== Geography ==
The village is located in the southern area of Burgenland and belongs to the municipality of Großpetersdorf.

== History ==
Miedlingsdorf was first mentioned in documents in the year 1325 known under the name of “Meren“, which has its roots in the Slavic language. In the following years, the name of the village changed a few times: „Mellersdorf“ (1532), „Melesdorf“(1574) and finally in the year 1722 „Miedlingsdorff“.

During the time of the Ottoman wars in Europe from 1529 until 1532 the village was destroyed by the Turkish legions. In the mid of the 16th century the Batthyány governance brought Croatian settlers into this area. Since this point in time, three different nationalities lived in Miedlingsdorf.

According to various documents the village had 160 residents in the year 1792 and already 299 residents in 1836. The population census on 15 May 2001 showed a resident count of 243 people.

== Sights ==
In the year 1697 a chapel was built outside the nowadays village, which was dedicated to James, son of Zebedee. Based on various brick findings in this area, it seems like the original village was also based in this area. Today this chapel is the oldest remaining wooden chapel in Burgenland and is currently renovated under guidance of the Austrian State Office for Historical Monuments.

1866 a new church was built by master constructor Johann Brenner, which was renovated one hundred years later. Also, the already listed "Tausz organ" was renovated at that time. The new church is also devoted to James, son of Zebedee

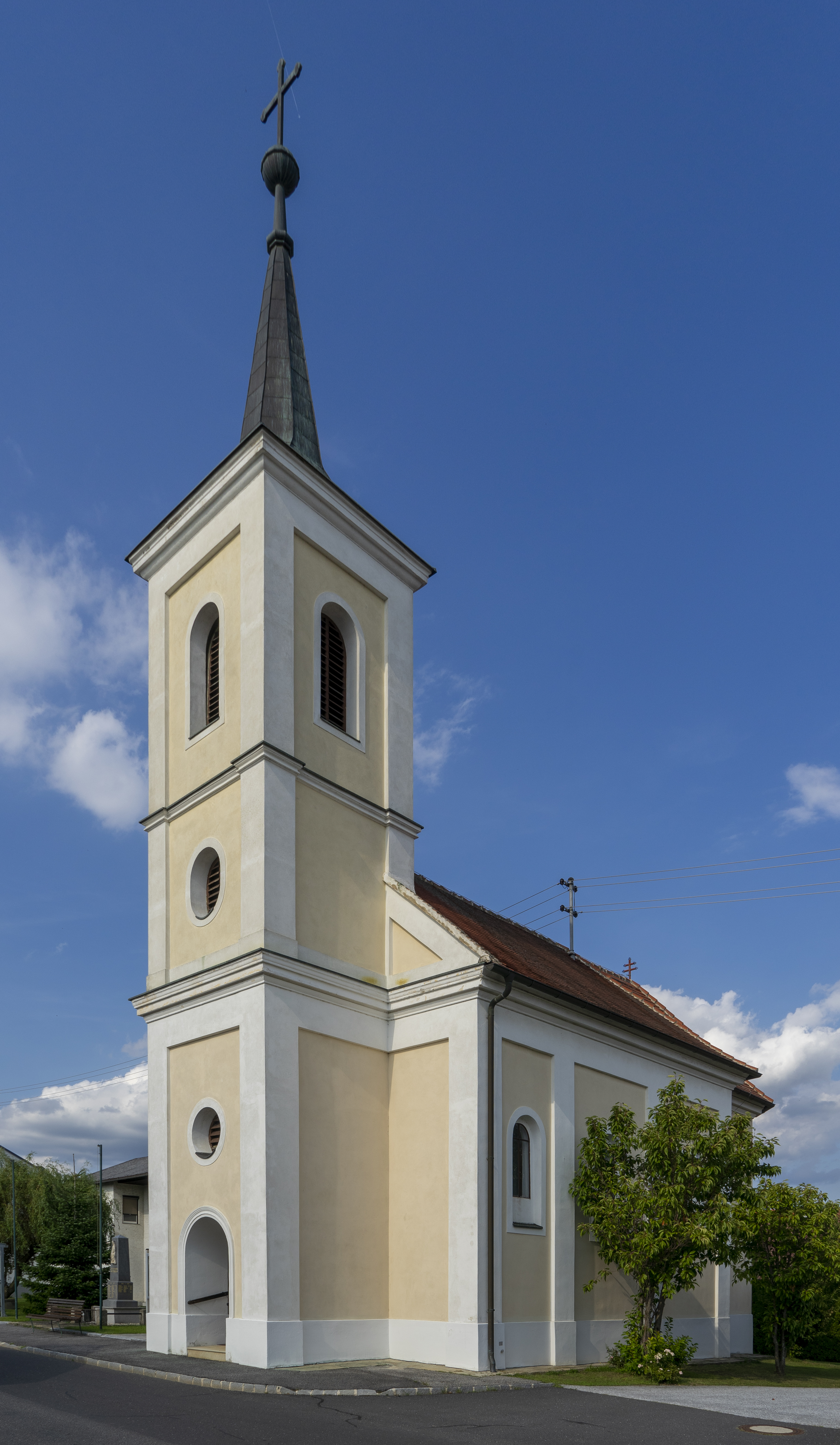
church

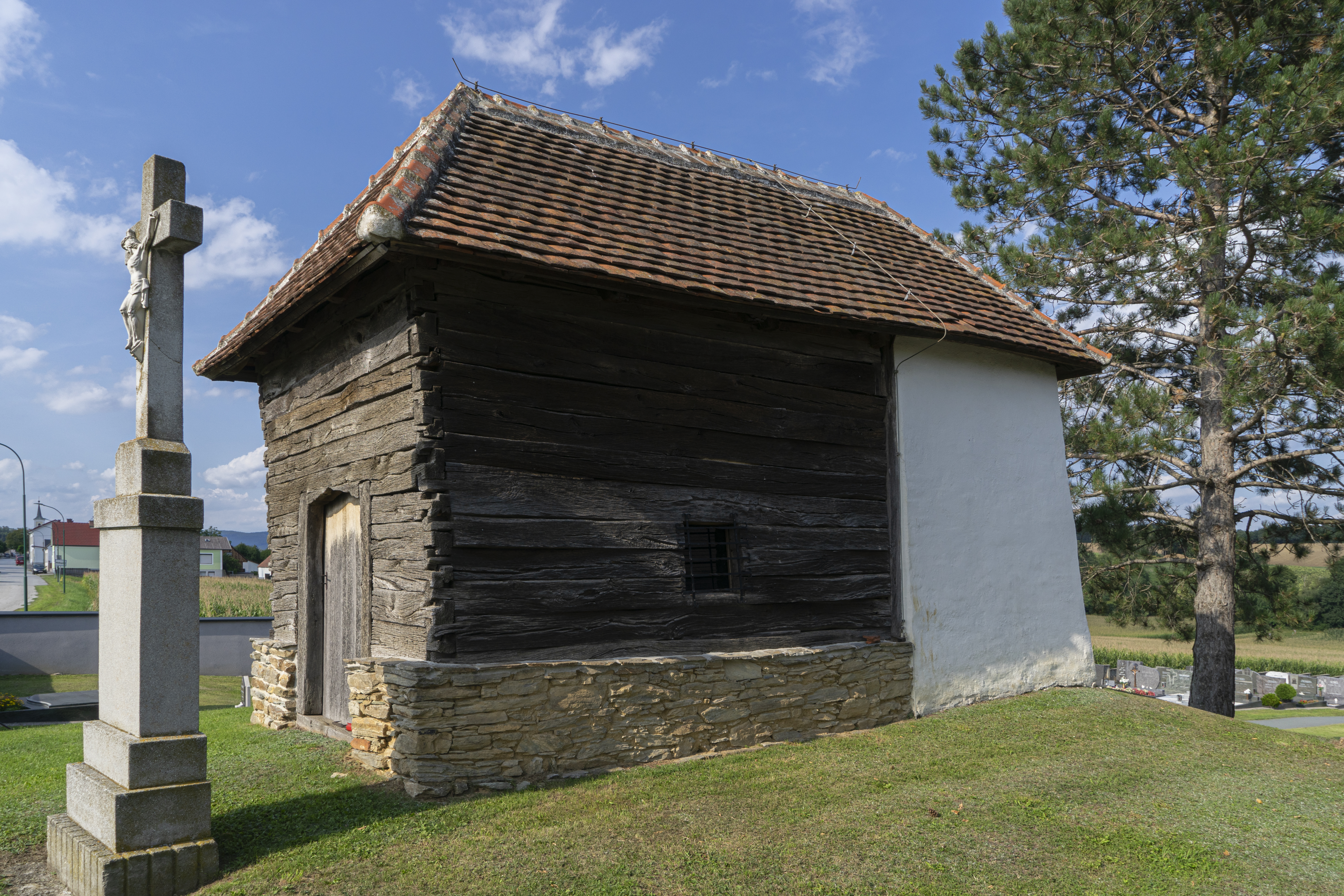
wooden chapel

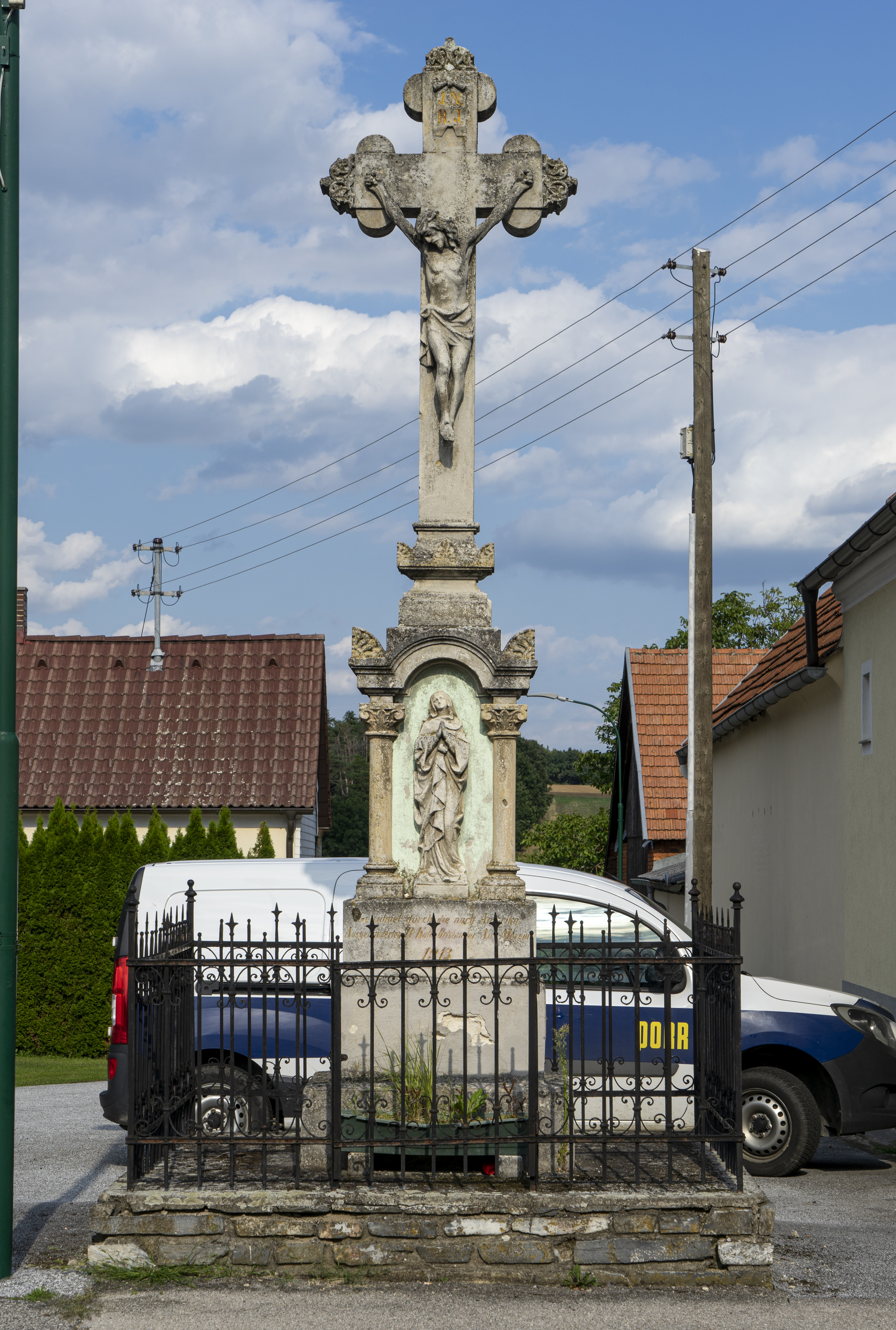
wayside cross, donated by emigrants to America

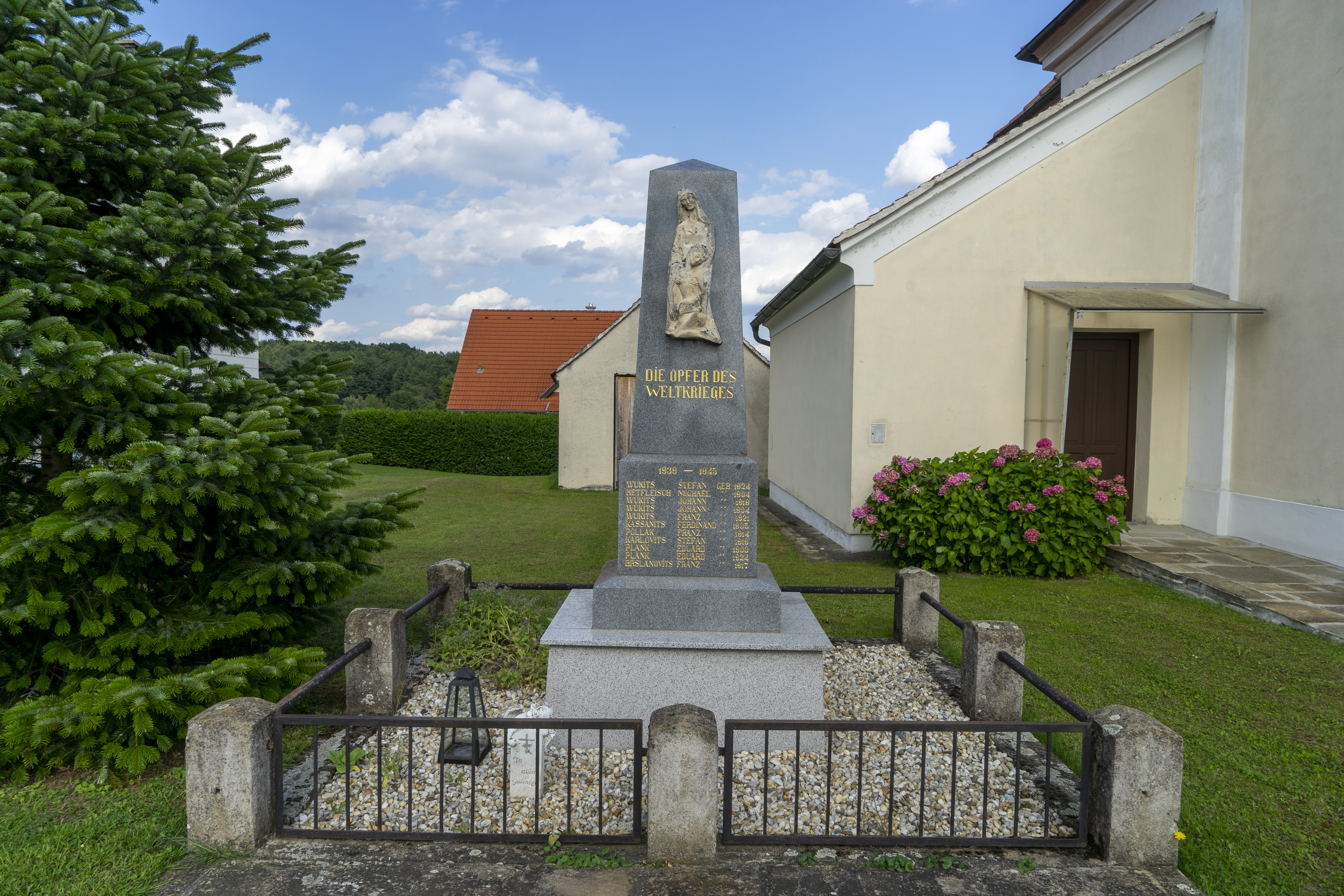
war memorial
