= Translation Terminology Writing =

- Discipline: Translation studies
- Language: French, English
- Edited by: Aline Francoeur

Publication details
- History: 1988-present
- Publisher: Canadian Association for Translation Studies (Canada)
- Frequency: Biannually

Standard abbreviations
- ISO 4: Transl. Terminol. Writ.

Indexing
- ISSN: 0835-8443 (print); 1708-2188 (web)
- OCLC no.: 640165560

Links
- Journal homepage; Online archive

Translation Terminology Writing (TTR from the French: Traduction, terminologie, rédaction) is a biannual peer-reviewed academic journal specializing in translation studies. It is published by the Canadian Association for Translation Studies and was established in 1988, by Jean-Marc Gouanvic and Robert Larose (Université du Québec à Trois-Rivières). The editor-in-chief is Aline Francoeur (Université Laval).

== Abstracting and indexing ==
The journal is abstracted and indexed in:

- Emerging Sources Citation Index
- International Bibliography of Periodical Literature
- MLA International Bibliography
- Scopus (2002-2012)
