= History of the Jews in Quebec =

Book by Pierre Anctil

- Author: Pierre Anctil
- Original title: Histoire des Juifs du Québec
- Translator: Judith Weisz Woodsworth
- Language: English
- Genre: Social history
- Publisher: University of Ottawa Press, Boréal
- Publication date: October 23, 2017 (French edition)
- Publication place: Canada
- English publication date: September 7, 2021
- Media type: Print: Hardcover, Paperback; Digital: eBook, PDF
- Pages: 504 (French edition); 475 (English edition)
- Award: Governor General’s Literary Award
- ISBN: 9780776629483
- Website: uottawa.ca

History of the Jews in Quebec is an English translation of the 2017 book Histoire des Juifs du Québec, written by Canadian author and historian Pierre Anctil, and translated by Canadian academic Judith Weisz Woodsworth. It was published in September 2021 by University of Ottawa Press and is the winner of the 2022 Governor General's Literary Award for French to English translation.

== Synopsis ==
In the three decades it took to write History of the Jews in Quebec, Anctil sums up Quebec Jewish history as a succession of migrations from Europe that carried with them the experience of an often painful minority. In the four centuries covered, the Jews of Quebec have shown a sense of belonging. The rights they systematically reclaimed and their sustained contributions have helped foster diversity in Quebec. With migration from different regions of the world, this continues today, making Judaism found in Quebec, and in particular in Montreal, unique from that found in other communities throughout North America.

== Awards ==
History of the Jews in Quebec won the Governor General’s Literary Award for French to English translation at the 2022 Governor General's Awards. The book was selected by a three-person peer assessment committee, and the award was granted by the Canada Council for the Arts, which is normally presented by the Governor General of Canada at a ceremony held at Rideau Hall. Histoire des Juifs du Québec won the 2018 J.I. Segal Award for best book in English or French.

== Reception ==
The book was generally well received. In the Canadian Jewish News, Elias Levy writes, "Historian Pierre Anctil has just published a masterful, comprehensive, and fascinating book, History of the Jews in Quebec, in which he recounts four centuries of Jewish life in Quebec." Additionally Levy describes it as, "A work that will go down in the annals of Jewish history in Canada." Ira Robinson included in Project MUSE, "Anctil's Histoire des Juifs du Québec presents the reader with its own unique perspective on the significance of the Jewish presence in Quebec and, in particular, the often fraught historical relationship between Jews and French Canadians."
