= Mary E. Hofstetter =

Canadian arts administrator and educator

Mary E. Hofstetter CM

3rd President of Sheridan College
- In office 1988–1996
- Preceded by: Don Shields
- Succeeded by: Sheldon Levy

Personal details
- Education: Western University

Mary E. Hofstetter CM is a Canadian arts administrator and educator who served as president of Sheridan College from 1988 to 1996, general manager of the Stratford Festival from 1996 to 1998, and president of the Banff Centre for Arts and Creativity from 1999 to 2011.

== Education ==
Hofstetter attended Western University where she earned a Honors Bachelor of Arts (Hons. BA) and a Master of Arts (MA). She also received an Honorary Doctor of Laws (LL.D.) from her alma mater.

== Career ==
Hofstetter held leadership roles at Conestoga College and Mohawk College. She later became vice-president academic at Mohawk College for a four-year period. In 1988, Hofstetter was appointed president and chief executive officer (CEO) of Sheridan College, where she served for eight years, until 1996.

During her tenure at Sheridan, Hofstetter led a shift of the college's focus and infrastructure, guiding it toward strategic initiatives in expanding partnerships and a globalized approach to education. She implemented the "Awards for Excellence" program, recognizing faculty and staff for leadership, creativity, and dedication to student success. Sheridan's animation program garnered international attention, including from The Walt Disney Company, which later collaborated with Sheridan on curriculum initiatives. Hofstetter oversaw expansions at Sheridan, including an addition to Davis Campus in 1990 and the opening of a student center at the Oakville campus in 1992. Under her leadership, Sheridan's enrollment reached approximately 10,000 full-time students by 1994. In 1994, she implemented a strategic plan that included initiatives to increase international partnerships and support for technological development within Sheridan's programs. Due to financial constraints and reduced provincial funding, her administration undertook budget reductions in 1995, resulting in the closure of several campuses and programs.

After leaving Sheridan College, Hofstetter served as general manager of the Stratford Festival from 1996 to 1998. She worked closely with artistic director Richard Monette during this time, contributing to the administrative functions that supported the festival's programming.

In 1999, Hofstetter accepted the position of president and CEO of the Banff Centre for Arts and Creativity, where she remained for twelve years. Her work at the Banff Centre included capital campaigns and fundraising efforts, securing approximately $120 million for campus redevelopment and program endowments. She secured contributions from both the Province of Alberta and the Government of Canada, as well as private donors. The funds supported the construction of facilities such as the Shaw Amphitheatre and the Kinnear Centre for Creativity & Innovation. Hofstetter broadened the Centre's reach as a destination for artists and cultural practitioners. In 2013, Hofstetter was appointed a member of the Order of Canada in recognition of her contributions to arts education and cultural administration in Canada.

== Personal life ==
Hofstetter is married to R. David Riggs, who has worked as a senior vice president with an international consulting firm. Following her retirement from the Banff Centre, she and her husband returned to Stratford, Ontario, where she continued her involvement in arts administration through consulting and board roles, including work with the Glenn Gould Foundation and Western University's advisory council for the School of Dance Studies.
