= Claude Lajeunesse =

Canadian engineer

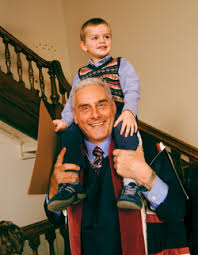
- Claude with grandson Lucas.

7th President and Vice-Chancellor of Ryerson University
- In office 1995–2005 (Note: Ryerson Polytechnic University became Ryerson University in 2002, during Lajeunesse's term as President)
- Preceded by: Terry Grier
- Succeeded by: Sheldon Levy

President and Vice-Chancellor of Concordia University
- In office August 1, 2005 – October 31, 2007
- Preceded by: Frederick Lowy
- Succeeded by: Michael Di Grappa (interim)

Personal details
- Born: 1941 (age 84–85) Quebec City, Quebec
- Spouse: Nicole Lajeunesse
- Children: Marc, France, Pascale, Francois, Christine and Nathalie
- Education: École polytechnique de Montréal, Rensselaer Polytechnic Institute

Claude Lajeunesse (born 1941) is a Canadian engineer and corporate executive. Since 30 November 2007, he has been the president and chief executive officer of the Aerospace Industries Association of Canada. He is the former president and vice-chancellor of Concordia University in Quebec.

== Career ==
Claude Lajeunesse was born in Quebec City, received a Master of Science degree in 1967 in Nuclear Engineering and a PhD in 1969. He is a member of the boards of TD Meloche Monnex, Atomic Energy of Canada Limited, the Montreal Board of Trade, and the Canadian Liver Foundation, a Fellow of the Canadian Academy of Engineering, and a member of the Ordre des ingénieurs du Québec.

From 1995 until August 2005, Lajeunesse was president and vice chancellor of Ryerson University. Prior to this, he was CEO of the Association of Universities and Colleges of Canada. He was appointed to serve a five-year term as the president and vice-chancellor of Concordia University in Montreal beginning 1 August 2005, but left this post on 31 October 2007 due to conflicts with the Concordia board of governors.

== Criticism and public perception ==
Lajeunesse has been criticized for "corporatization" of the universities he has headed by emphasizing part-time labor, raising tuition fees, and union busting.

At both Ryerson and Concordia, Lajeunesse's first acts included giving himself a 50% pay raise, and increases of 20-50% for his immediate entourage. Lajeunesse defended these changes as bringing parity with other universities in Canada. However, unions were critical, as their membership had gone without wage increases for five years, and the university's offer of a 2.5% increase did not address parity or even the cost of living increase.

Academic offices
Preceded by Terry Grier	President and Vice-Chancellor of Ryerson University; 1995–2005	Succeeded by Sheldon Levy
Preceded by Frederick Lowy	President and Vice-Chancellor of Concordia University; 2005–2007	Succeeded by Judith Woodsworth

Preceded by Peter Boag	President and Chief Executive Officer, Aerospace Industries Association of Canada; Nov. 30, 2007	Succeeded by
