= General Hospital Psychiatry =

- Discipline: Psychiatry
- Language: English
- Edited by: Jeffrey C. Huffman

Publication details
- History: 1979-present
- Publisher: Elsevier
- Frequency: Bimonthly
- Impact factor: 3.220 (2018)

Standard abbreviations
- ISO 4: Gen. Hosp. Psychiatry

Indexing
- CODEN: GHPSDB
- ISSN: 0163-8343 (print); 1873-7714 (web)

Links
- Journal homepage; Online access; Online archive

General Hospital Psychiatry is a bimonthly peer-reviewed medical journal covering psychiatry. It was established in 1979 and is published by Elsevier. The editor-in-chief is Jeffrey C. Huffman (Massachusetts General Hospital). According to the Journal Citation Reports, the journal has a 2018 impact factor of 3.220.
