= University of Science and Technology of Oran - Mohamed Boudiaf =

- جامعة العلوم و التكنولوجيا بوهران - محمد بوضياف
- Type: Public university
- Established: September 1, 1986
- Rector: Amine Bouziane Hammou
- Location: Bir El Djir, Oran, Algeria; 35.736759°N 0.554123°W
- Language: Arabic, French, English
- Website: www.univ-usto.dz

The University of Science and Technology of Oran - Mohamed Boudiaf (USTO - MB) is a public university located in the municipality of Bir El Djir in the eastern suburbs of Oran, Algeria.

USTO - MB was ranked 59th in the 2016 U.S. News & World Report regional ranking of Arab universities.

== History ==
Oran has been equipped with higher education and scientific research and technological development since the establishment of the Institut de Génie Civil et Mécanique d’Oran (IGCMO) by decree No. 75-27 of April 29, 1975, from the Ministry of Higher Education. This institute was located south of Oran on the way to Es Senia.

In September 1986, Oran was endowed with a university hub as important as the University of Oran Es-Senia, but more modern and in East Oran. Initially named the University of Science and Technology of Oran (USTO), it was designed by Japanese architect Kenzō Tange and covered an area of 89 hectares. It was later renamed the University of Science and Technology of Oran - Mohamed Boudiaf in memory of the assassinated President Mohamed Boudiaf.

== Faculties and departments ==
The university comprises seven faculties and two institutes with a total of twenty-one departments, as well as a language teaching center:

- Faculty of Mathematics and Computer Science
  - Mathematics
  - Computer Science
- Faculty of Physics
  - Physical Engineering
  - Materials Technology
  - Energy Physics
- Faculty of Natural and Life Sciences
  - Biotechnology
  - Applied Molecular Genetics
  - Life and Environment
- Institute of Applied Sciences and Techniques
- Institute of Physical Education and Sports
  - Sports Training
- Faculty of Chemistry
  - Physical Chemistry
  - Materials Chemistry
  - Chemical Engineering
- Faculty of Electrical Engineering
  - Electronics
  - Electrical Engineering
  - Automatics
- Faculty of Mechanical Engineering
  - Mechanical Engineering
  - Maritime Engineering
  - Mining and Metallurgy
- Faculty of Architecture and Civil Engineering
  - Architecture
  - Civil Engineering
  - Water Engineering
- Intensive Language Teaching Center

=== Health ===
With the opening of the Établissement hospitalier universitaire d'Oran (EHU Oran), a new large and modern hospital in Bir El Djir, opposite USTO-MB, Oran's old hospital, the Centre hospitalier universitaire d'Oran (CHU Oran), has been relieved of patients in a rapidly growing city.

With the establishment of this new hospital, a faculty was designed at USTO-MB, the Faculty of Medicine Moulay-Driss-Mansouri (formerly Faculty of Medicine USTO), to train future doctors who will work at EHU Oran or elsewhere. The Faculty of Medicine is thus the second in the city after the Faculty of Medicine of Oran (formerly National Institute of Higher Education in Medical Sciences of Oran "INESSM Oran"), located opposite CHU Oran.

=== Sports activities ===
The university also includes an Institute of Physical Education and Sports for the training of bachelor's and master's degrees in physical education and sports. It is equipped with international standard sports facilities (football stadium with an athletics track, Olympic swimming pool, etc.) to develop university sports in the country.

== Scientific research ==
USTO-MB is involved in the National Commission for the Evaluation of University Research Projects (CNEPRU), the National Agency for the Development of University Research (ANDRU), and the National Agency for the Development of Research in Health (ANDRS). The university is equipped for scientific research, with laboratories designed for this purpose. It also collaborates with foreign universities.

== Rectors ==
- Prof. Lazrag Hacene

== Notable alumni ==
- Nora Zaïr, Algerian photographer and engineer.

== See also ==
- Education in Algeria
- List of universities in Algeria
