= Canadian Association for Translation Studies =

Canadian non-profit organization

The Canadian Association for Translation Studies(CATS) [fr: Association canadienne de traductologie] is a Canadian non-profit organization that promotes research on translation, writing, terminology, and interpretation.

== History ==
The Canadian Association for Translation Studies was founded in 1987. It is a member of the Federation for the Humanities and Social Sciences, an organization that represents Canadian universities and scholarly associations.

The association has signed a memorandum of cooperation with the American Translators and Interpreting Studies Association

== Mission ==
The organization's aims stated in its Constitution are to foster research in translation and interpreting, to promote further education for teachers of translation and interpreting, and to offer advice on the training of translators and interpreters. The association hosts an annual conference as part of the Congress of the Humanities and Social Sciences hosted by the Federation for the Humanities and Social Sciences.

== Publications ==
Since 1998, CATS has published a biannual academic journal, TTR, which focuses on translation, terminology and writing. The journal publishes articles in both French and English.

== See also ==
- Translation studies
- Young's Literal Translation
- Intercultural communication
