= Beyond the Rack =

Canadian online shopping company

- Type: Private
- Industry: Clothing industry
- Founded: 2009
- Founder: Yona Shtern; Robert Gold
- Headquarters: Montreal
- Key people: Yona Shtern; Robert Gold
- Website: beyondtherack.com

Beyond the Rack is a Canadian online shopping company that operates a website that offers clothing, accessories, fragrances, electronics, home goods, beauty and home decor products. The company was founded in 2009. In 2014 it had ten million members, comprising the largest free Canadian private shopping club.

== History ==
Beyond the Rack was launched in 2009 by Yona Shtern and Robert Gold. Shtern was the former chief marketing officer at Ice.com, My Virtual Model and Microcell Telecommunications. Gold was the former president of Gosh Marketing and Donald Berman Enterprises. In 2011, Internet Retailer magazine called Beyond the Rack the fastest growing online retailer in the USA. The company is privately held with its offices in New York City and Montreal. The site current serves 15 million members internationally and works with various major partner companies.

== Overview ==
Beyond the Rack visitors must be members in order to view the company's merchandise. Products are grouped into sale "events" from a single brand or small groups of brands. An email is sent to all members prior to each event's start. Once launched, each of the events lasts 48 hours.

In 2011 the company started retailing designer wedding dresses, and in the same year the Montreal Gazette named the company one of the fastest-growing companies in Quebec. In 2013, the company had achieved sales in excess of $150 million. Its investors include Panorama Capital, Highland Capital Partners, BDC Venture Capital, Export Development Canada, Tandem Expansion Fund, Rho Canada and Inovia Capital. In 2014, Beyond the Rack received $10 million funding with the Silicon Valley Bank.

=== Beyond the Rack ===
Beyond the Rack serves over ten million members in North America and offers merchandise from over 3,000 brands. The website organizes 15 new sales each day.

=== BTR Home ===
Launched in October 2011 as a subsidiary of Beyond the Rack, BTR Home offers bed and bath, furniture, decor, kitchenware, wall art and home organizer brands, including U.S Polo Linens, Kosta Boda Crystal, KitchenAid and Cuisinart appliances and Denby dinnerware.
