= Chamber of Commerce of Metropolitan Montreal =

Association of businesses and businesspeople in Greater Montreal, Canada

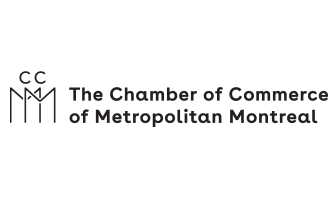
- Founded: 1822
- Type: Advocacy group
- Purpose: Business advocacy
- Location: World Trade Centre Montreal
- Region served: Greater Montreal, Quebec, Canada
- Method: Media attention, direct-appeal campaigns, political lobbying
- Key people: Michel Leblanc (President & CEO), Philippe Johnson (Chair of the Board)
- Website: Chamber of Commerce of Metropolitan Montreal

The Chamber of Commerce of Metropolitan Montreal (until 2016: Board of Trade of Metropolitan Montreal) (French: Chambre de commerce du Montréal métropolitain) is an association of businesses and businesspeople in Greater Montreal. In its own words it serves to "act as the voice of Montréal's business community and to promote the prosperity of the city and its businesses".

== History ==
For almost two centuries, the Chamber of Commerce of Metropolitan Montreal has played a key role in the economic, social, and cultural growth of Montreal.

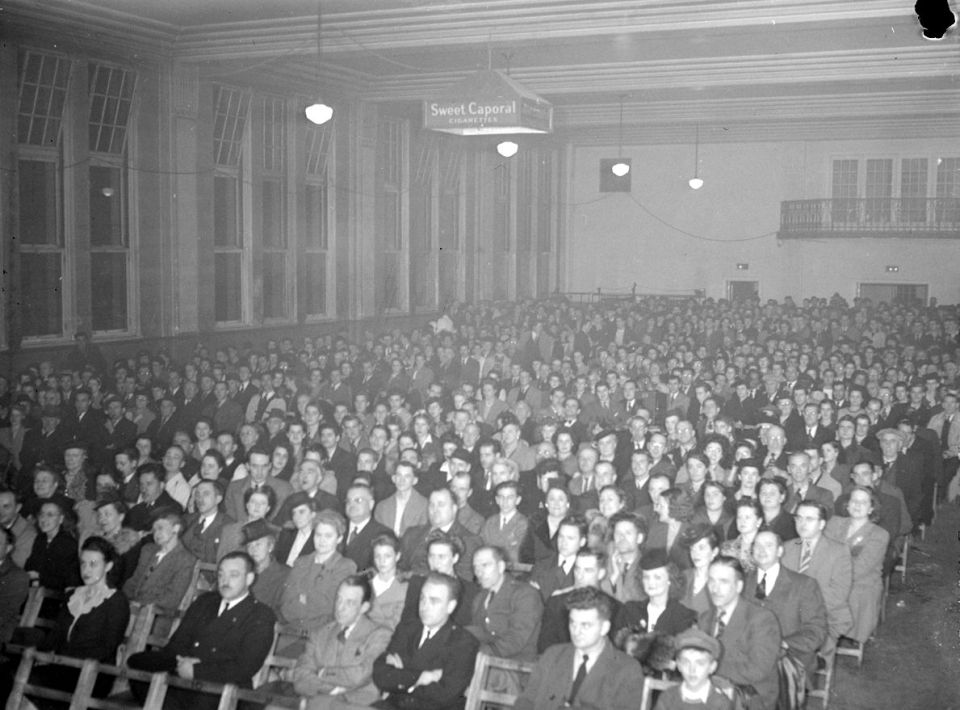
1945 Board of Trade event

It was in 1822 that a group of about fifty merchants founded the committee of trade (Board of Trade) to promote the development of Montreal. In 1857, the organization set the wheels in motion to begin dredging the St. Lawrence River and build port facilities in Montreal able to handle ships with a large tonnage. In 1863 the Board of Trade founded the Port Warden's Office and the Corn Exchange.

In 1887, 135 merchants founded a French-speaking trade association, the Chambre de commerce du district de Montréal, which began to push for improved railroad connections in the metropolitan area. Five years later, in 1892, the Chambre proposed the creation of the École des Hautes Études Commerciales, an internationally renowned institution that now welcomes 9,000 students from 60 countries. In 1940, the Chambre was also instrumental in promoting the complete restructuring of Montreal's municipal government.

In summer 1984, the Chambre de commerce du district de Montréal changed its name to the Chambre de commerce de Montréal. Five years later, it changed names again, becoming the Chambre de commerce du Montréal métropolitain. In 1992, that organization merged with the Montreal Board of Trade to become a single bilingual business association (the Board of Trade of Metropolitan Montreal), the largest of its kind, who unites economic, social, and cultural stakeholders in Greater Montreal.

In 2002, following the creation of the new city of Montreal and the Montreal Metropolitan Community, the Board of Trade reaffirmed its resolutely metropolitan vision of development. At the same time, it updated its operating procedures to reflect these new realities and better respond to the new challenges they bring with them.

In 2003, it continued this restructuring by consolidating its affiliates – including Info enterprises and the World Trade Centre Montreal – which became branches of the Board of Trade of Metropolitan Montreal. These new branches aimed to enable the Board of Trade to offer specialized services to Quebec's greater business community in the areas of providing information about funding and company start-up programs and exports.

In 2016, the Board of Trade changed its name to the Chamber of Commerce of Metropolitan Montreal.

== See also ==
- Economy of Montreal
- Vancouver Board of Trade
