= List of Toronto Metropolitan University people =

The following is a list of notable people associated with Toronto Metropolitan University.

== Notable alumni ==
=== Media and arts ===
==== Entertainment ====
- Mikey Bustos - Filipino-Canadian YouTuber, founder of AntsCanada, Actor and Singer
- Paul Chato - comedian and member of The Frantics comedy troupe
- Kyle Forgeard - YouTuber and co-founder of NELK
- Natalie Glebova - Miss Universe 2005
- Sabrina Jalees - comedian
- Dominic Panganiban - Filipino-Canadian YouTuber and animator known for his YouTube channel "Domics"
- Lauren Riihimaki - YouTube Celebrity

==== Film and theatre ====
- Brad Abraham - screenwriter, RoboCop: Prime Directives
- Barry Avrich - film director, film producer, playwright, author
- Liane Balaban - star of the film New Waterford Girl
- Marjorie Beaucage - Métis filmmaker
- Kristin Booth - actress
- Alex Bulmer - playwright and theatre artist
- Chad Connell - actor
- Brandon Cronenberg - film director and son of David Cronenberg
- Nicole Dorsey - director and screenwriter
- Shelley Gillen - producer, screenwriter and songwriter
- Alicia K. Harris - director and screenwriter
- David Hayter - actor, director and producer
- Michael Healey - playwright
- Zoe Leigh Hopkins - filmmaker, actor; her 2004 film Prayer for a Good Day premiered at Sundance Film Festival
- Kenneth Joel Hotz - filmmaker, actor, journalist, photographer, writer; Kenny vs. Spenny and South Park
- Kate Kelton - actress
- Michael Kennedy - film and television director, Little Mosque on the Prairie
- Julia Kwan - Canadian screenwriter and director
- Hawick Lau - actor
- Mena Massoud - actor cast to play Aladdin in Disney's live-action remake of Aladdin.
- Bruce McDonald - feature film and television director, Hard Core Logo, Pontypool and The Tracey Fragments
- Haley McGee - actress and playwright
- Debra McGrath - actress and comedian
- Denis McGrath - screenwriter (Across the River to Motor City, Skyland, Charlie Jade)
- Pat Mills - director and screenwriter
- Michelle Mohabeer - filmmaker, film professor
- Andrew Moir - filmmaker
- Christopher Moloney - writer and photographer
- Jasmin Mozaffari - film director and screenwriter
- John Paskievich - Genie Award-winning filmmaker
- David J. Phillips - actor and producer
- Jeremy Podeswa - film and television director
- Kazik Radwanski - film director and screenwriter
- Keerthi Reddy - Indian Bollywood and Tollywood actress
- Katherine Ryan - Comedian, writer, presenter and actress based in the United Kingdom
- Kenn Scott - WGC award-winning screenwriter
- Nia Vardalos - writer and actress, Academy Award-nominated writer and star of My Big Fat Greek Wedding
- Evan Williams - Canadian actor and musician
- Ellen Wong - actress
- Elizabeth Yake - filmmaker

==== Journalism and publishing ====
- David Anaglate - Ghanaian Journalist, formerly head of the Ghana Broadcasting Corporation (GBC)
- Glen Baxter - journalist, FashionTelevisionChannel, formerly with Citytv
- Christie Blatchford - columnist for The Globe and Mail
- Susan Bonner - CBC radio and television journalist, anchor of The World at Six
- Tyler Brûlé - journalist, founder of Wallpaper* and Monocle (Did not graduate)
- Dianne Buckner - television journalist
- Travis Dhanraj - television journalist
- Joan Donaldson - journalist, formerly of CBC, and CTV, founding head of CBC Newsworld
- Francis D'Souza - journalist, Citytv
- Natasha Fatah - journalist and producer, CBC Radio One
- Gemma Files - horror writer
- Matthew Fraser - editor-in-chief of National Post
- J.M. Frey, science fiction and fantasy writer
- Michael Friscolanti - senior writer for Maclean's magazine, and author
- Gayleen Froese - horror/mystery author
- Liza Fromer - former co-host of Breakfast Television on Citytv
- Kimberly Halkett - Al Jazeera's White House correspondent
- Bill Haugland - Canadian journalist and former news anchor for CFCF-TV in Montreal
- Helen Anne Henderson - journalist and disability rights advocate
- Tanya Huff - fantasy author
- Paul Hunter - television journalism, CBC News
- Maureen Jennings, novelist
- Nil Köksal - journalist, CBC Television
- Tanya Kim - entertainment news journalist, TV host
- Marcia MacMillan - anchor, CTV News Channel
- Sam Maggs - author, entertainment journalist, and comic book and video game writer
- Heather Mallick - columnist and author, formerly with The Globe and Mail
- Carol Anne Meehan - anchor of CTV Ottawa
- Suhana Meharchand - television host and journalist, CBC
- Wendy Mesley - television anchor and host, CBC
- Tony Parsons - broadcaster, formerly of CTV and CHUM, former host of Canada Tonight on Global
- Louise Penny - mystery novelist
- Monita Rajpal - news anchor for CNN International
- Robert J. Sawyer - Hugo Award-winning science-fiction writer
- Alison Smith - journalist, CBC Newsworld
- Graeme Smith - Moscow bureau chief for The Globe and Mail
- Brian Stewart - Senior Correspondent, The National, CBC News
- Betty Thompson - news presenter at CKCO in Kitchener, Ontario
- Robyn Urback (born 1988) - journalist and political commentator
- Marcia Young - broadcast journalist, host of The World This Hour on CBC Radio

==== Music ====
- Stefan Babcock - musician, lead singer and guitarist of the punk band PUP
- Simina Grigoriu (born 1981), Romanian born Canadian-German electronic musician
- Hayden - folk singer-songwriter
- Tyler Stewart - musician, drummer for the Barenaked Ladies
- Chris Stiliadis - Commercial music producer & rapper
- Karoline Podolak - Operatic soprano

==== Radio and television ====
- Raymond Ablack - actor, Degrassi: The Next Generation
- Emily Andras - showrunner, Wynonna Earp
- Ralph Benmergui - radio and television personality, host of Friday Night! with Ralph Benmergui and Benmergui Live on CBC-TV
- Rick Brace - president of CTV
- Kevin Brauch - host of The Thirsty Traveler
- Dave Devall - former CFTO-TV weather personality
- Nina Dobrev - actress, star of The CW show The Vampire Diaries and Degrassi: The Next Generation
- Raina Douris - radio personality
- David James Elliott - star of JAG
- Martin Gero - writer and producer, Stargate Atlantis
- Jessica Holmes - comedian-actress on Royal Canadian Air Farce
- Ross Hull - star of the TV series Student Bodies
- Jason Jones - The Daily Show correspondent
- Dan Levy - actor, director Schitt's Creek
- Eric McCormack - Emmy Award winner, star of Will & Grace
- Stuart McLean - Canadian radio broadcaster, humorist, monologist, and author
- Ari Millen - actor (Orphan Black)
- Shay Mitchell - actress Pretty Little Liars
- Joseph Motiki - television personality, former co-host of the TVOKids Crawlspace
- Zarqa Nawaz - creator of Little Mosque on the Prairie
- Candice Olson - host of Divine Design
- Terry O'Reilly - host of Under the Influence on CBC Radio One
- Valerie Pringle - broadcaster, former co-host of Canada AM
- Mike Sheerin - Gemini nominated documentary director (Secret Mulroney Tapes)
- Cliff Solway - producer and director, CBC Television
- Hannah Simone - MuchMusic VJ; actor on New Girl
- Patty Sullivan - children's television host, Kids' CBC
- Torri Webster - actress, star of TV series Life with Boys
- Tonya Lee Williams - actress, notably of The Young and the Restless
- Jeff Wincott - actor of TV series Night Heat and Sons Of Anarchy
- Ellen Wong - actress, notably Scott Pilgrim vs. the World and GLOW.
- Jacqueline MacInnes Wood - actress, star of CBS show The Bold and the Beautiful

==== Sports ====
- Tom Anselmi - sports executive, former president and COO of Maple Leaf Sports & Entertainment (MLSE)
- Jamie Campbell - Sportsnet broadcaster
- Steve Dangle - Born Steve Glynn, CEO of SDPN, YouTube Creator for Rogers Sportsnet, sports analyst, author
- Michelle Duff - as Mike Duff, raced in World Championship motorcycle events
- Martine Gaillard - sports anchor on Rogers Sportsnet, formerly with The Score
- Gail Kim - professional wrestler
- Monika Klisara - karateka and professional wrestler
- Michael Landsberg - Host of TSN's Off The Record
- Steve McAllister - sports editor for Yahoo! Canada, formerly with The Globe and Mail
- Bob McKenzie - sports broadcaster on TSN, formerly of The Hockey News and The Toronto Star
- Jay Onrait - TSN SportsCentre host
- Keith Pelley - sports media executive
- Cabbie Richards - TSN personality
- Paul Romanuk - sportscaster
- Rob Rusnov - Olympic athlete for Team Canada in archery
- Kevin Sally - Olympic athlete for Team Canada in archery
- Doug Sellars - sports television executive for CBC Sports and Fox Sports
- Adnan Virk - sports anchor for ESPN

==== Visual arts and fashion ====
- Lida Baday - fashion designer
- Brian Bailey - mentor to designers on Project Runway Canada
- Edward Burtynsky - landscape photographer
- Walter Chin - commercial photographer
- Yuri Dojc - commercial photographer
- Sunny Fong - fashion designer
- Rob Gonsalves - painter
- Jeremy Laing - fashion designer, won a scholarship to Toronto Metropolitan and now shows at New York Fashion Week
- Todd Lynn - fashion designer
- Scott Moore - sports television executive at CTV/Rogers Sportsnet, CBC Sports, and Hockey Night in Canada
- Erdem Moralıoğlu - fashion designer
- Marian Penner Bancroft - artist and photographer
- Bill Reid - Haida artist and wood carver

=== Politics ===
- Omar Alghabra - politician
- Gary Carr - politician, Chair of Halton Region, former Ontario PC Party MPP and Liberal Party MP
- Olivia Grange - Minister of Youth, Sports and Culture in Jamaica, Member of Jamaican Parliament
- Paul Godfrey - Canadian politician and businessman (honorary)
- Jim Jones - city councillor, former Member of the Canadian Parliament
- Ted Moses - politician
- Mario Racco - Councillor in the City of Vaughan and former Ontario MPP for Thornhill
- Wayne Thomson - mayor of Niagara Falls
- Adam Vaughan - Member of the Canadian Parliament; former city councillor for Ward 20 Trinity—Spadina; journalist, formerly of Citytv and CKLN-FM

==== Health and medicine ====
- Carol Couchie - first Indigenous registered midwife in Ontario
- Cathy Crowe - "street nurse" and social activist

=== Science and technology ===
- Nasra Agil - civil engineer and entrepreneur
- Wendy Walsh - clinical psychotherapist, Ph.D.

=== Business ===
- Patrick Dovigi - founder and CEO of GFL Environmental
- Sue Gardner - executive director of the Wikimedia Foundation
- Tony Gagliano - president of St. Joseph Communications; chairman of the Art Gallery of Ontario; winner of Canadian of the Year 2008
- Robert D. Richards - space entrepreneur, co-founder of the International Space University (ISU)
- Isadore Sharp - founder of the Four Seasons Hotels and Resorts
- Klaus Woerner - founder and former CEO of ATS Automation Tooling Systems Inc.; 1997 Canadian Entrepreneur of the Year

== Faculty ==
- Akua Benjamin - former professor and Director of TMU’s School of Social Work
- Eugene Chan - Professor in marketing
- Olivia Chow - former professor; mayor of the City of Toronto
- Jack Layton - former politics professor; former leader of the NDP, former leader of the opposition
- Gregory Levey - professor, entrepreneur, author
- Laurie Petrou - associate professor in the RTA School of Media; author
- Donna E. Young - dean of the Lincoln Alexander School of Law
- Madeh Piryonesi - writer, poet and translator

== Administration ==
=== Principals and Presidents ===
No.	Name	Term	Notes
1	Howard Hillen Kerr	1948‍–‍1966 (18 years)	Founder of the Ryerson Institute of Technology, previously Director of the Training and Re-Establishment Institute. Namesake of Kerr Hall. Changed name to Ryerson Polytechnical Institute in 1964
2	Fred Jorgenson	1966‍–‍1969 (3 years)	Renamed the office to President in 1964. Namesake of Jorgenson Hall
–	Anthony Wilkinson (acting)	1969‍–‍1970 (1 year)	
3	Donald Mordell	1970‍–‍1974 (4 years)	
–	George Korey (acting)	1974‍–‍1975 (1 year)	
4	Walter Pitman	1975‍–‍1980 (5 years)	Namesake of Pitman Hall
5	Brian Segal	1980‍–‍1988 (8 years)	
6	Terrence W. Grier	1988‍–‍1995 (Note: Dennis Mock served as acting president from August 1990‍–‍January 1991) (7 years)	First to be both President and Vice-Chancellor, made the institution a university in 1994
7	Claude Lajeunesse	1995‍–‍30 September 2005 (10 years)	Changed name to Ryerson University in 2002
8	Sheldon Levy	1 August 2005‍–‍1 December 2015 (11 years)	Namesake of the Sheldon & Tracy Levy Student Learning Centre
9	Mohamed Lachemi	30 September 2016‍–‍31 December 2026 (Note: Lachemi served as Acting President from the time of Sheldon Levy's departure on 1 December 2015 until his appointment as full president) (8 years)	Changed name to Toronto Metropolitan University in 2022
10	Roberta Iannacito-Provenzano	1 January 2027‍–‍31 December 2031 (projected)	First woman to hold the office of President and Vice-Provost

=== Chancellors ===
No.	Name	Term	Notes
1	David Crombie	1994‍–‍1999 (5 years)	56th Mayor of Toronto
2	John Craig Eaton II	1999‍–‍2006 (7 years)	
3	G. Raymond Chang	2006‍–‍18 October 2012 (6 years)	Namesake of the Chang School of Continuing Education
4	Lawrence Bloomberg	19 October 2012‍–‍9 October 2018 (6 years)	
5	Janice Fukakusa	10 October 2018‍–‍9 October 2024 (6 years)	
6	Donette Chin-Loy Chang	10 October 2024‍–‍present	
