= Rogers Communications Centre =

Building of Toronto Metropolitan University

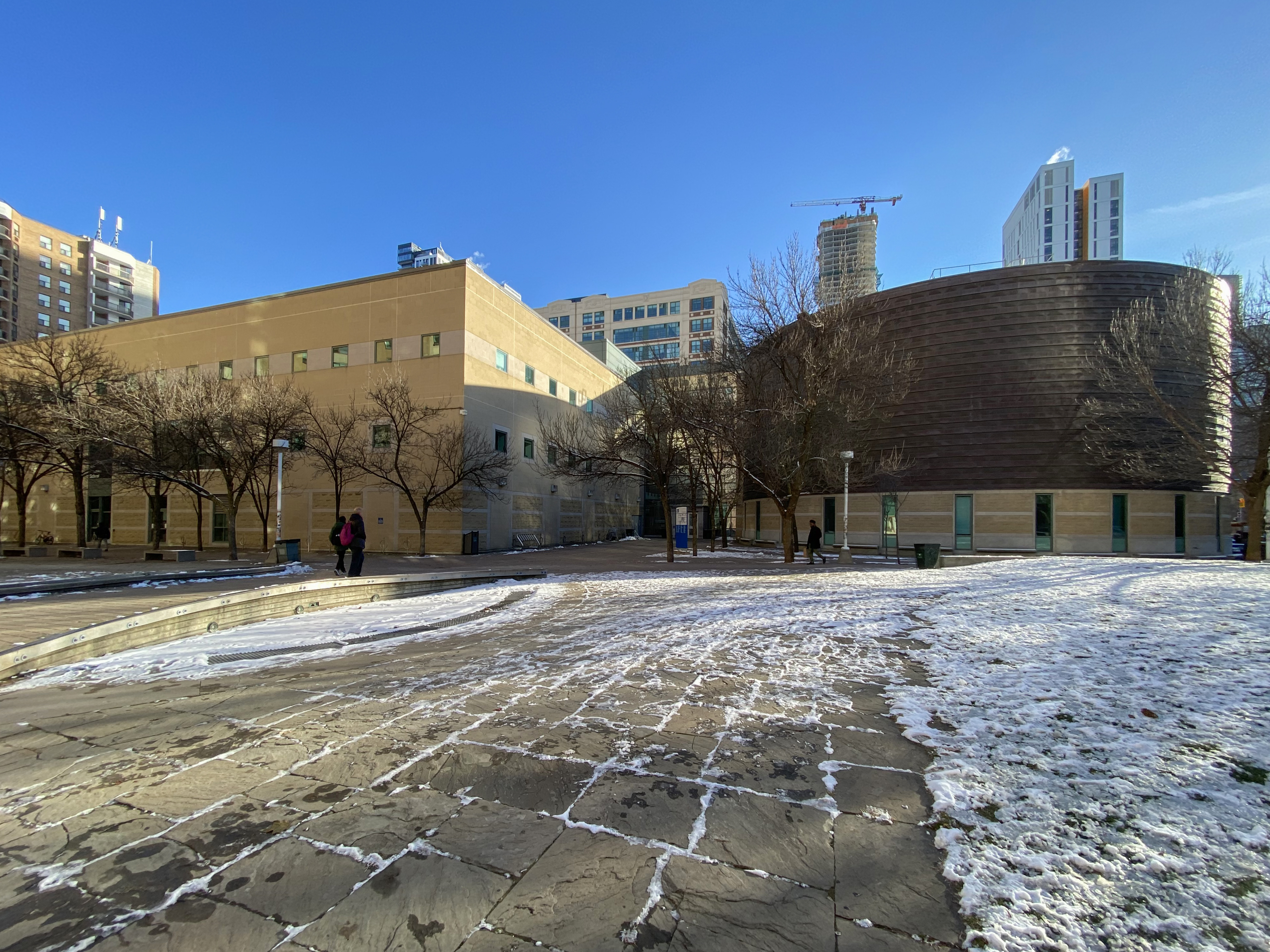
- View of the RCC from the garden
- Interactive map of the Rogers Communications Centre area

General information
- Type: Educational
- Location: Toronto, ON, 80 Gould Street
- Coordinates: 43°39′31″N 79°22′38″W
- Current tenants: The Creative School
- Completed: 1992 (34 years ago)
- Client: Toronto Metropolitan University

Other information
- Public transit: TMU

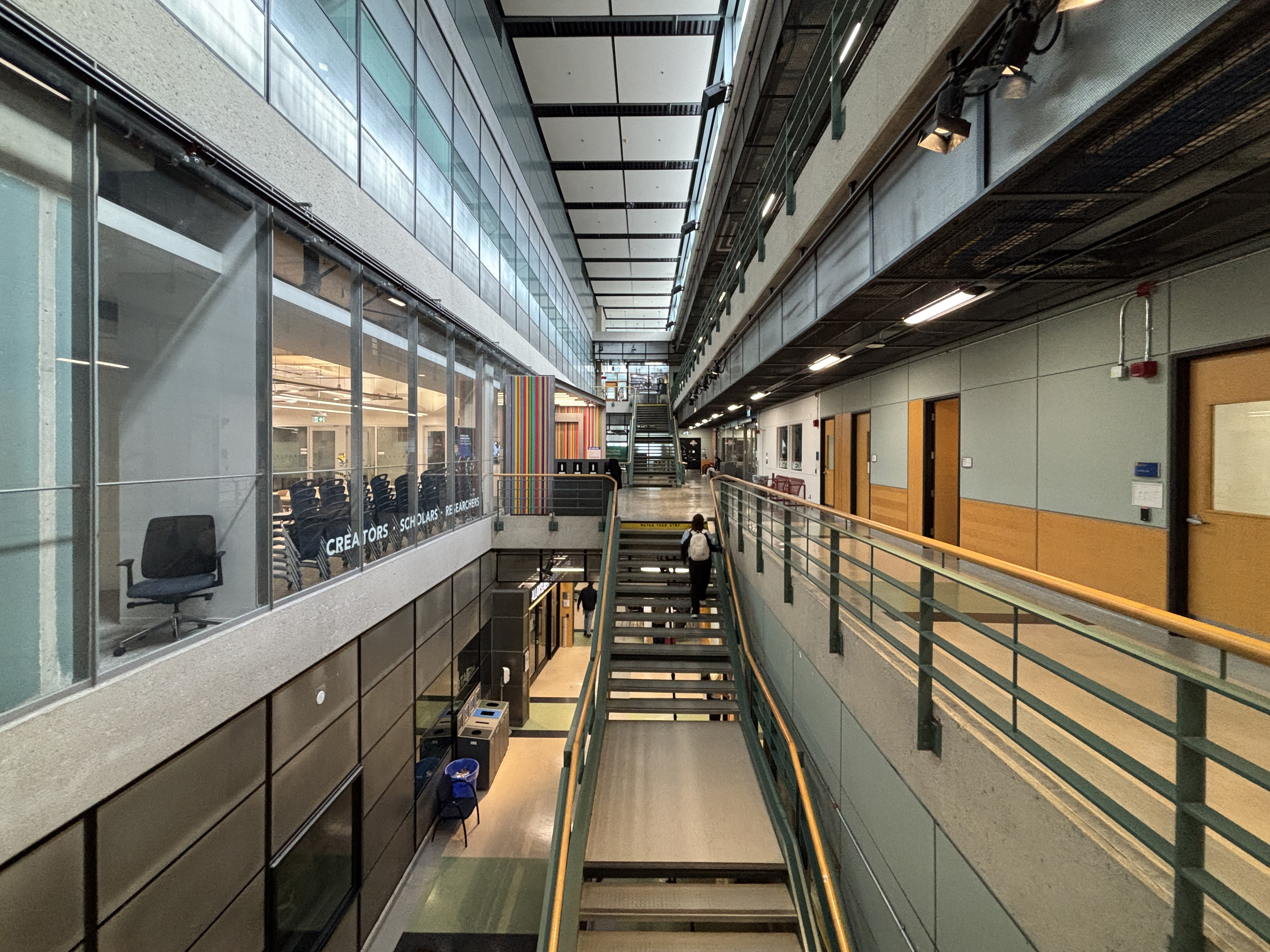
Interior of the building

The Rogers Communications Centre (RCC) is a building on the campus of Toronto Metropolitan University. It is home to The Creative School (formerly the Faculty of Communication and Design) and its departments, including the RTA School of Media. Completed in 1992, it is located at 80 Gould Street in downtown Toronto, Canada.

The RCC is home to 3 high-definition television studios, as well as multiple audio recording and video editing suites. The building is home to the Allan Slaight Radio Institute. It also houses the newsrooms for The Eyeopener and On the Record, the university's two student-run newspapers.

In November 2018, The Creative School opened a new Creative Research Centre, known as the Catalyst, on the 2nd floor of the building.

The building is not directly sponsored by Rogers Communications, although its naming is the result of a personal $12.5 million contribution to the university by that company's longtime owner, Ted Rogers, and his wife Loretta in honour of Ted's father, communications pioneer Edward S. Rogers, Sr.

The building is connected to Kerr Hall South and East via a pedestrian bridge over Church Street, connecting the second floors of both buildings.

== Research Labs within the Rogers Communication Centre ==
The opening of the Catalyst in November 2018 created a home for a number of research labs inside the Rogers Communication Centre. These include:

- The FCAD Audience Lab
- The Centre for Communicating Knowledge
- The Centre for Fashion Diversity and Social Change
- The Centre for Free Expression
- The CoLab
- The Colour Media Lab
- The Creativity Everything Lab
- The Documentary Media Research Centre
- The Experiential Media Research Institute
- The Future of Live Entertainment Lab
- The Global Communication Governance Lab
- The Global Experiential Sport Lab
- The Infoscape Research Lab
- The Media Innovation Research Lab
- The Print Media Research Centre
- The Ryerson Journalism Research Centre
