= The Creative School =

Faculty at Toronto Metropolitan University

Coordinates: 43°39′31″N 79°22′37″W

- Former names: Faculty of Communication and Design (1984–2021)
- Type: Public
- Established: 1984; 42 years ago
- Parent institution: Toronto Metropolitan University
- Dean: Natalie Alvarez
- Students: 6,085
- Location: Toronto, Ontario, Canada
- Website: torontomu.ca/the-creative-school

The Creative School is an academic division for communications and design at Toronto Metropolitan University (TMU), located in downtown Toronto, Ontario, Canada.

Founded in 1984 as the Faculty of Communication and Design (FCAD), it re-branded to The Creative School in 2021. Its departments offer 15 undergraduate programs and 11 graduate programs, and it is based in the Rogers Communications Centre.

== History ==
The first department in The Creative School was the Ryerson Theatre School (RTS), now known as the School of Performance. Founded in 1971, it was established in response to growth in the Canadian Theatre Industry and modelled after London's Central School of Speech and Drama. The Ryerson Theatre School then incorporated the Canadian College of Dance, adding dance training to its offered programs. The Faculty of Communication and Design (FCAD) was established in 1984, and became one of the few North American institutions offering full-time professional training in acting, dance, and technical production.

Over the decades, The faculty's scope grew to include a range of programs in journalism, media, communication, design. In 2019, the Innovation Studio was created as a collaborative entrepreneurial hub, following the Digital Media Zone (DMZ) launched by former TMU president Sheldon Levy.

On August 16, 2021, the faculty changed its name from the Faculty of Communication and Design to The Creative School, a decision met with some criticism from students.

The Creative School acquired the TMU Theatre in 2024, which had previously been operated by the University Business Services, and re-branded it as the Chrysalis.

== Academics ==
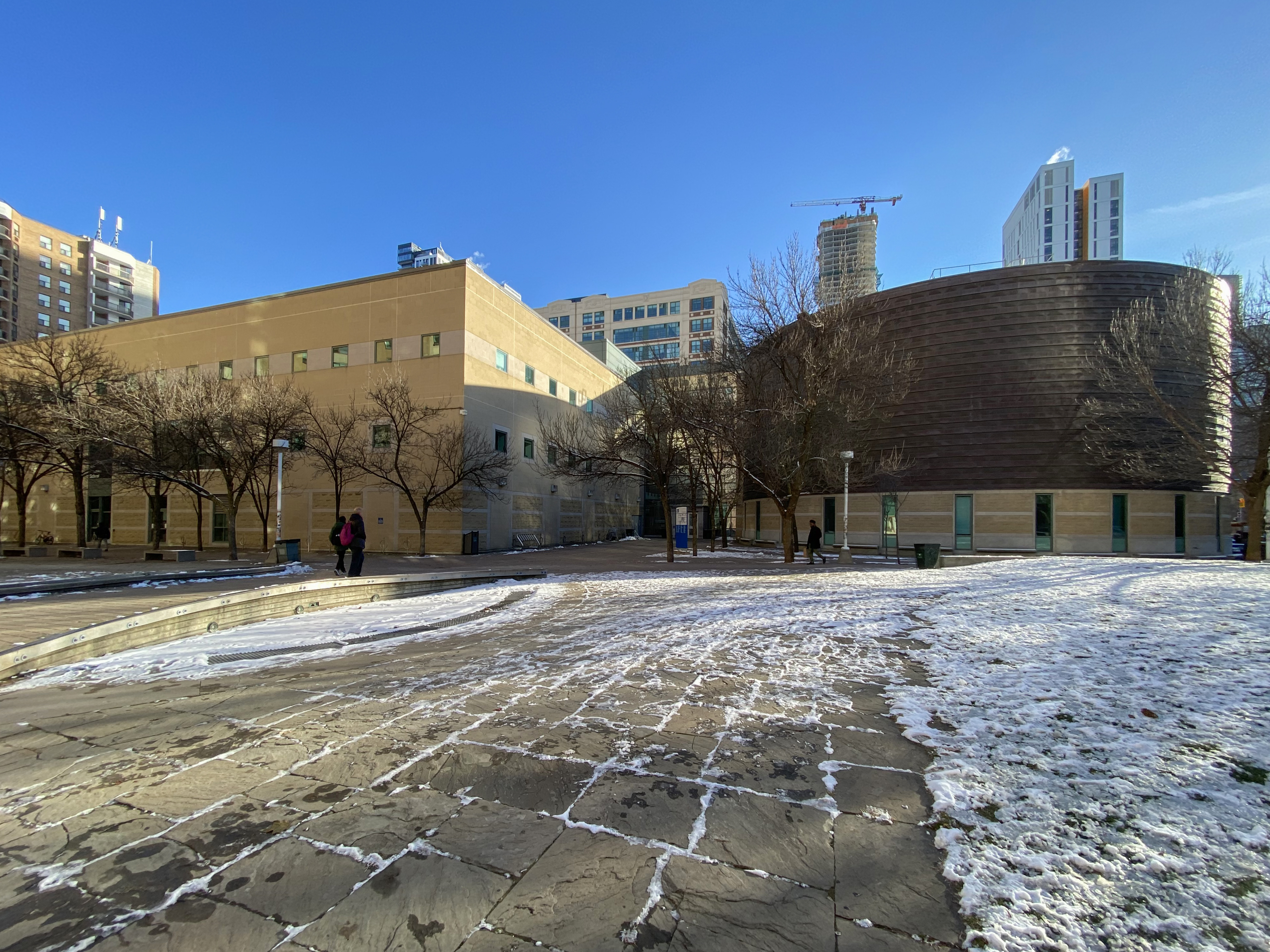
The Rogers Communications Centre which houses the School

There are 27 undergraduate programs at The Creative School including acting, creative industries, dance, fashion, film, graphic communications management, interior design, journalism, media productions, new media, performance design and production, photography media arts, professional communication, music, and sport media.

Since 2024, the faculty has offered The Creative School Pro, a program for continuing skill development in creative industries delivered virtually. Topics have included an introduction to Unreal Engine visual effects and CASO (Computer Animation Studios of Ontario) production management.

=== Departments and schools ===
The Creative School consists of several academic departments. They include:

- School of Creative Industries
- School of Fashion
- School of Graphic Communications Management
- School of Image Arts
- School of Interior Design
- School of Journalism
- New Media Department
- School of Performance
- RTA School of Media
- Theatre School
- Department of Professional Communications
