= Eugene Chan =

Eugene Chan may refer to:

- Eugene Chan (linguist), a linguist from Hong Kong specializing in numeral systems
- Eugene Chan (professor), a professor of marketing in Toronto, Canada

== See also ==
- Eugene Chen (1878–1944), former Chinese foreign minister
