= Durjoy Datta =

Indian author and screenwriter

- Born: 7 February 1987 (age 39); Mehsana, Gujarat, India
- Education: Delhi College of Engineering, Management Development Institute
- Occupations: Indian author and screenwriter
- Spouse: Avantika Mohan
- Writing career
- Years active: 2008– Present
- Genres: Romance, Thriller
- Website: dattadurjoy.com

Durjoy Datta is an Indian author and screenwriter.

== Early and personal life ==
Durjoy Datta was born on 7 February 1987 in Mehsana, Gujarat, in a Bengali Hindu family, and was brought up in New Delhi. He completed his schooling at the Bal Bharati Public School, Pitampura, and went on to do mechanical engineering at Delhi Technological University. He has done his post-graduation from Management Development Institute, Gurgaon and Frankfurt School of Finance & Management, Germany. In 2011, he quit his job as a marketing analyst and became a full-time writer.

Durjoy met Avantika Mohan, a cabin crew member and model, through mutual friends. They had a high-profile engagement when Datta live-tweeted a marriage proposal using the hashtag #Marrymeavantika while Mohan was on a flight. The couple tied the knot in an intimate ceremony in Dehradun on March 1, 2016. The couple have two daughters: Rayna Mohan Datta (born 2017) and Varya Mohan Datta (born 2023).

== Career ==
Durjoy Datta's first novel, Of Course I Love You! (co-authored with Maanvi Ahuja) was released by Srishti Publishers in 2008 when he was still in college. In August 2009, his second novel, Now That You're Rich!, was released. In the summer of 2010, his third novel, She Broke Up, I Didn't!, released. His fourth novel, Ohh Yes, I Am Single!, was co-written with Neeti Rustagi. After graduating from MDI, Gurgaon, in 2011, he co-founded Grapevine India Publishers. His fifth novel, You Were My Crush!, was published by Grapevine India Publishers in September 2011. If It's Not Forever!, his sixth novel, was released on 1 February 2012. In the same year, Till the Last Breath... was published. On 4 February 2013, Someone Like You, a novel he co-wrote with Nikita Singh, was released by Penguin India. His ninth novel Hold My Hand released on 5 August 2013. His tenth novel When Only Love Remains was published on 19 June 2014. His eleventh novel World's ̷Best Boyfriend was published on 24 April 2015. His twelfth novel, Our Impossible Love and thirteenth novel, The Girl of my Dreams were published in 2016. He has co-authored books with Maanvi Ahuja, Neeti Rustagi, Orvana Ghai and Nikita Singh. He has also hosted TEDx talks and conferences in colleges, and has written blogs for Miss Malini and That's So Gloss.

He was listed among young achievers in Media and Communications by Whistling Woods International in 2011. His debut show Sadda Haq – My Life, My Choice won the Youth Show – fiction category at Zee Gold Awards in 2014 and at Indian Telly Awards in 2014 and 2015.

== Works ==
=== Novels ===
- Of Course I Love You..!...Till I Find Someone Better (co-author Maanvi Ahuja) (2008)
- Our Impossible Love (2016).
- The Girl of my Dreams (2016).
- The Boy who Loved (2017)
- The Boy with A Broken Heart (2017)
- Wish I Could Tell You (2019)
- World's Best Girlfriend (2023)

=== Television shows ===
- Sadda Haq – My Life, My Choice (co-writer Sumrit Shahi) (2013–2016)
- Kuch Rang Pyar Ke Aise Bhi [Screenplay writer (co-writer Raghuvir Shekhawat)] (2016–2017)
- Never Kiss Your Best Friend [Screenplay writer] (2020)
- Kill Dill - The Heartbreak Club [Dialogues and Screenplay Writer (co-writer Sumrit Shahi] (2025)

== Awards and recognition ==
- 2017 Crossword Book Award, Popular Choice Award, fiction, for Our Impossible Love
- 2018 Crossword Book Award, Popular Choice Award, fiction, for The Boy Who Loved

== See also ==
- List of Indian writers
