= The GIST =

Canadian sports media company

- Type: Private
- Industry: News media
- Founded: 2017; 9 years ago
- Headquarters: Canada
- Area served: United States, Canada
- Key people: Roslyn McLarty, Jacie deHoop, Ellen Hyslop
- Products: 4x-weekly sports news newsletter 3x-weekly sports business newsletter 3x-weekly college sports newsletter The GIST of It podcast
- Members: Over 1 million
- Number of employees: 40-50
- Website: www.thegistsports.com

The GIST is a Canadian sports media company founded in 2017 by Roslyn McLarty, Jacie deHoop, and Ellen Hyslop. They run newsletters and a podcast called "The GIST of It". The GIST's content is written by women and provides coverage of both men's and women's sports, with a goal of connecting with people who felt left out of the sports community.

== History ==
The GIST was started in late 2017, when friends and graduates of Queen's University at Kingston McLarty, deHoop and Hyslop launched a weekly newsletter to an initial group of 500 subscribers. By 2022, the company had over 500,000 email subscribers across its three newsletters.

In 2018, The GIST raised their initial funding of $100,000 through Toronto's DMZ incubator program. The group subsequently were invited to the Toronto Metropolitan University Future of Sport Lab and the LIFT Labs Accelerator via NBCUniversal.

In 2020, the group's founders were named to the Forbes 30 Under 30 list in the media category. The GIST were approved a $350,000 loan from the Business Development Bank of Canada in 2021, bringing their new funding across venture and state-backed credit incentives to $1.35 million.

In 2025, The GIST and Canadian Olympic Committee launched a new media partnership aimed at improving Canadians engagement with the Olympic movement.
