= The World This Hour =

CBC Radio One program

- Genre: Newscast
- Country of origin: Canada
- Home station: CBC Radio
- Recording studio: Toronto, Ontario
- Original release: November 7, 2005 – present

The World This Hour is a Canadian radio newscast, which airs on CBC Radio One.

The program premiered on November 7, 2005, replacing the network's prior news program Canada at Five as an afternoon newscast airing at 3, 4 and 5 p.m. weekdays. In that format, it was hosted at different times by Marcia Young, Bernie McNamee, and Tom Harrington.

On November 6, 2017, CBC Radio One revised its news programming structure, with The World This Hour now the name of most of the network's hourly newscasts throughout the day, apart from the morning show block where the newscast retains the title World Report, and the 6 p.m. block in which the network continues to air the full half-hour newscast The World at Six. Harrington continued as the anchor of afternoon drive editions and the program's managing editor until his retirement from the CBC in March 2025. Other members of CBC Radio's news team currently anchor the program.
