= Spoonity =

Software company in Ottawa

- Spoonity's logo
- Type: Private
- Industry: Software, Loyalty programs
- Founded: 2011
- Headquarters: Ottawa, Ontario, Canada
- Key people: Max Bailey, Jose Gomez, Brandin Chiu
- Products: Spoonity loyalty platform
- Website: spoonity.com

Spoonity is a Canadian business-to-business (B2B) software as a service (SaaS) company that develops digital loyalty programs, marketing automation tools, and payment integration systems for the quick-service restaurant (QSR), retail, and hospitality industries. Headquartered in Ottawa, Ontario, the company operates a cloud-based platform that connects point of sale (POS) transaction data with digital ordering channels.

Founded in 2011 by Max Bailey and Myron Gomes, Spoonity expanded from an Ottawa-based startup into a multinational software provider, serving over 5,000 locations in more than 30 countries. The platform processes tens of thousands of transactions daily and supports a user base of over 12 million consumers. Following participation in the inaugural Google Cloud Accelerator Canada in 2021, the company integrated artificial intelligence and machine learning capabilities for predictive customer analytics and automated marketing.

== Clients ==
The company's clients include QSR brands such as Carl's Jr., Krispy Kreme, Wingstop, Burger King, Dunkin' Donuts, and Denny's. Regional clients include Ten Ren's Tea in Canada, Café Martínez in Argentina, and Meet Fresh, a Taiwanese dessert chain with locations in California.

== Funding ==
After a $30,000 grant from Coral CEA in 2011, and initial challenges with venture capital, the company went on to receive funding from the MaRS Investment Accelerator Fund, The DMZ, and private angel investors totalling $825,000.

== Leadership ==
The company is led by co-founder and CEO Max Bailey, Chief Revenue Officer Jose Antonio Gomez Velez, and Chief Technology Officer Brandin Chiu. Jose Gomez, an Ecuadorian-Canadian engineer, previously worked at Nortel Networks and BlackBerry before joining Spoonity full-time in 2016. He led the company's expansion into Latin America. Brandin Chiu previously worked developing applications for Lightspeed Commerce prior to joining Spoonity.

In 2025, Bailey was named a recipient of the "Forty Under 40" award, presented by the Ottawa Business Journal and the Ottawa Board of Trade. The 2025 cohort was selected from 159 nominations.
