= That's So Gloss =

Indian women's magazine

That's So Gloss!
- Website type: Online magazine
- Available in: English
- Owner: Young Folks Media
- Website: www.thatssogloss.com
- Commercial: Yes
- Registration: Optional
- Launched: 2012
- Current status: Not active (2015)
- Content license: Copyright

That's So Gloss (stylized as That's So Gloss!) was an online magazine and community targeted at young women in India. Founded in 2012, it came into prominence for being India’s first web magazine for teenage girls and young women - a pioneer in digital publishing in India highlighting the potential of the digital medium for publishing in developing countries. As of 2012, it was the only Indian magazine, print or online, for this segment.

== Background ==
The magazine was founded by Sharanya Haridas, an undergraduate at the Indian Institute of Technology Madras. In November 2011, it was entered at the X-Biz Business Plan Competition sponsored by the Emerson Electric Company and conducted by the Indian Institute of Management Ahmedabad with the idea for “Gloss”. It was initially conceived as webzine exclusively for a teen demographic. The idea was a finalist and winner of over 60 teams worldwide.

== Business overview ==
That's So Gloss! test-launched in the first half of 2012 with emerging bloggers as well as established writers such as Durjoy Datta and Rohini Rai. In April 2012, it was announced that it would be incubated in Toronto as part of the Ryerson University's Ryerson Digital Media Zone International Fellowship program. The decision to launch in Toronto was said to be taken keeping in mind the greater freedom awarded and resources available to youth-led start-ups in Canada as compared to India.

== Public Relations ==
That’s So Gloss! functioned as a PR platform for companies both in India and internationally seeking to connect with the teen and college going segment.

Since its initial launch, That’s So Gloss! was featured in and various mainstream and independent media both in India, and internationally, for being a pioneer in digital publishing, including The Times of India, Entrepreneur, Financial Post (Canada), CBC Metro Mornings, RCI, The Hindu, Hindustan Times, Techvibes, TechCircle, TechAloo and Kochi Vibe.
