= Tom Harrington (journalist) =

Canadian journalist

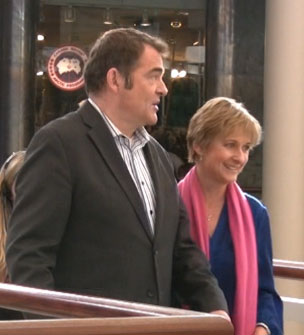
- Tom Harrington with former CBC colleague Claire Martin.
- Born: St. John's, Newfoundland
- Occupation: journalist
- Years active: 1980s-2025
- Known for: National Sports, Marketplace, The World This Hour

Tom Harrington is a Canadian retired radio and television journalist for the Canadian Broadcasting Corporation. Until recently, he was the anchor of CBC Radio One's afternoon news program The World This Hour.

A graduate of Memorial University of Newfoundland, Harrington joined the CBC as a sports reporter for CBC Calgary before moving to CBC Montreal. He later moved to the national CBC Sports division as anchor of National Sports, a sports news program on CBC Newsworld, and as a sports reporter for The National. His work for the CBC included covering Commonwealth Games, Pan-American Games and Olympic Games events. He was also heard as an occasional guest host on radio news programs such as The Current, The World at Six, As It Happens and Cross Country Checkup. He is a four-time Gemini Award nominee for best sports host.

At the end of his career with CBC, Harrington was the main host of Your World Tonight and was known for his sign-off, "Stay safe, and take care of each other."

He joined CBC Television's consumer affairs newsmagazine Marketplace as cohost in 2010, remaining with the program until joining The World This Hour in 2015.

In March 2025 he announced his retirement from the CBC, effective March 28. He is married and has one child.
