= Bernie McNamee =

Canadian retired radio journalist (born 1952)

Bernie McNamee (born 1952/53?) is a Canadian retired radio journalist, best known as a longtime anchor of news programming, including The World at Six, The World This Weekend and The World This Hour, on CBC Radio One. He has also been an occasional guest host of As It Happens.

Originally from St. Catharines, Ontario, he studied broadcasting at Niagara College, and worked for local radio stations CHSC and CKTB before joining CKNX-TV as a reporter. He later worked for CFRA in Ottawa, and was an anchor for the CKO radio network. He was a reporter for CFTO-TV in Toronto in the late 1980s before joining the CBC in 1989.

He retired from the CBC Radio in 2015.
