= The Eyeopener =

Student newspaper at Toronto Metropolitan University, Canada

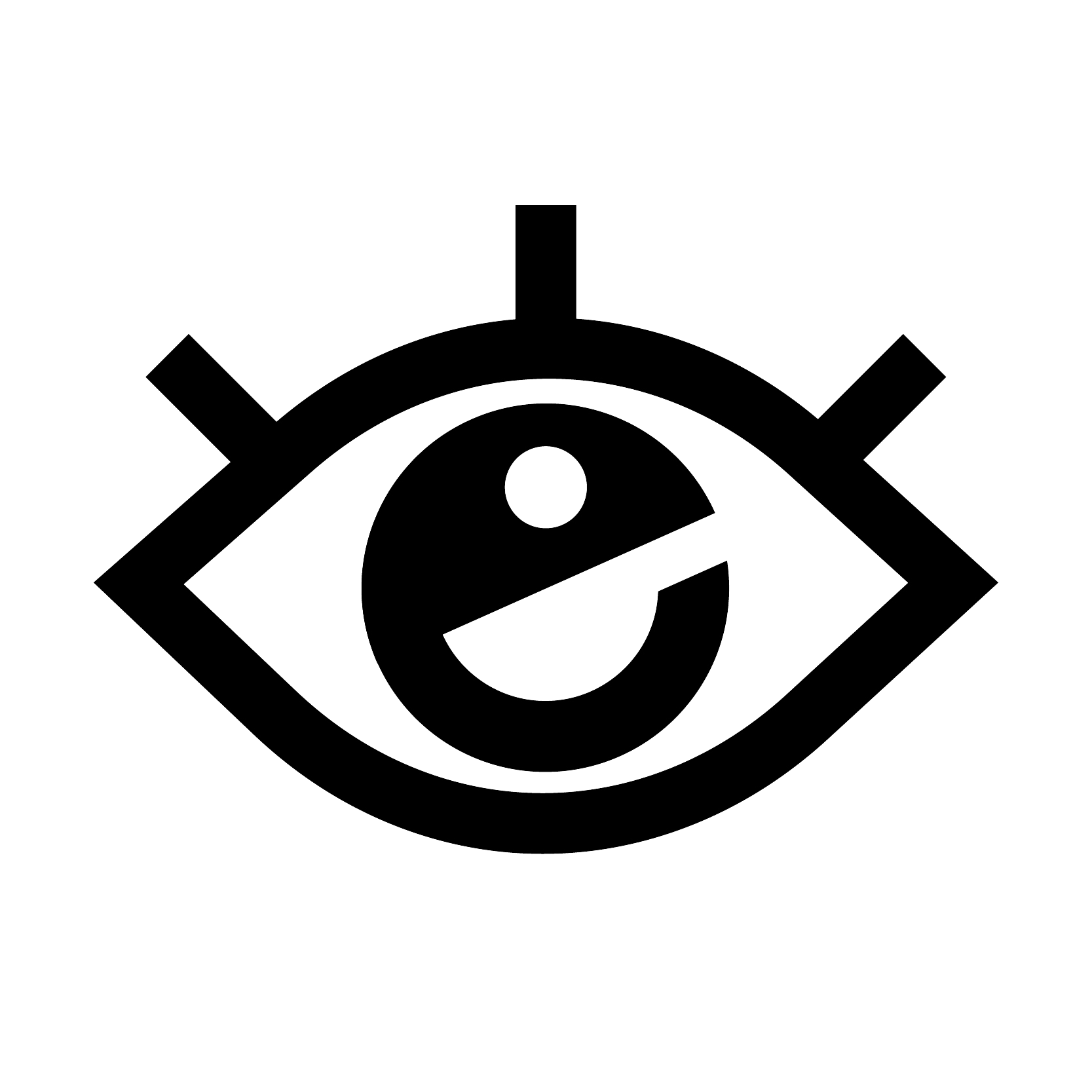

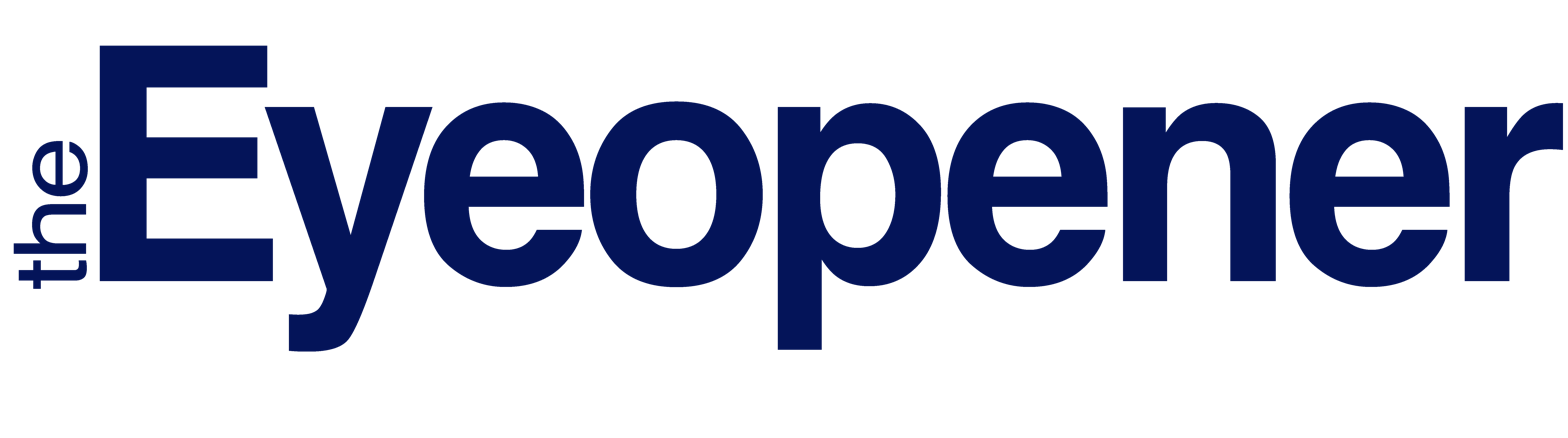
- Type: Student newspaper
- Format: Tabloid
- School: Toronto Metropolitan University
- Owner: Rye Eye Publishing Inc.,
- Founded: 1967; 59 years ago
- City: Toronto, Ontario
- Country: CAN
- ISSN: 0847-8791
- OCLC number: 1033013807
- Website: theeyeopener.com

The Eyeopener is one of two weekly student newspapers at Toronto Metropolitan University in Ontario, Canada. It has a circulation of 10,000 copies per week during the school year.

The Eyeopener is published by Rye Eye Publishing Inc., owned by the students of Toronto Metropolitan University as a non-profit corporation. Most of the writing is done by contributors (as is the case with most campus newspapers) but the paper's masthead is elected towards the end of each academic year, by the previous year's masthead and volunteers who have made a certain number of contributions. As of 2008, the minimum number of contributions to be eligible to vote is six. While contributors and editors are often students of the TMU School of Journalism, students in other programs are more than welcome to write for the paper.

The paper is composed of several main sections; news, arts and culture, business and technology, sports, features, community, video, editorial and a 'fun' page.

== History ==
=== Early days ===
The Eyeopener was started at what was then the Ryerson Polytechnical Institute on September 26, 1967, by Tom Thorne, a Radio and Television Arts student upset with the amount of editorial powers held by faculty members at The Ryersonian, now named On the Record. He took the name from a muck-raking turn-of-the-century weekly published in Calgary.

The other campus newspaper at Toronto Metropolitan University is On the Record, published by the university's Faculty of Journalism with a circulation of approximately 5,000 copies a week. The Eyeopener upped its circulation to 10,000 issues per week from 8,000 per week at the start of the 2007-2008 academic year.

In 2019, student newspapers and student councils at post-secondary institutions in Ontario faced the threat of significant losses of student fees after the provincial government led by Doug Ford introduced its Student Choice Initiative, which would have made some student association fees optional. The measure was struck down by a court.

== The COVID-19 Pandemic ==
Student media, like Toronto Metropolitan University itself, went online during the lockdowns imposed during the COVID-19 pandemic in Canada. After most people had been vaccinated, the paper reported on the university's new ventilation systems that were intended to mitigate the risk of infection.

Early in 2021, a former staffer claimed that he had been fired from the paper because he was Catholic.

== Notable alumni ==
- Christie Blatchford
- Mark Bonokoski
- Mark Bourrie
- Dianne Buckner
- Graeme Smith
- Kirk LaPointe
- Steve McAllister
- Jordan Heath-Rawlings
- Kirk Makin
- Bob McKenzie
- Wendy Mesley
- Jonathan Fowlie
- Michael Friscolanti
- Robyn Doolittle

== See also ==
- List of student newspapers in Canada
- List of newspapers in Canada
