= Marcia Young =

Canadian broadcast journalist

- Born: Marcia Williams; Toronto, Ontario, Canada
- Occupations: Journalist, broadcast news anchor

Marcia Young (née Williams) is a Canadian broadcast journalist, who is the current weekday anchor of World Report, the national morning newscast on CBC Radio.

== Early life ==
Young was born in Toronto, but spent her early childhood in Jamaica where she was raised by her grandparents. She returned to Toronto at the age of 6 to attend school. She is a graduate of the journalism program at Ryerson University (now Toronto Metropolitan University).

== Journalism career ==
Young began her broadcasting career in sports radio at The Fan 590 in Toronto. She then worked behind the microphone as a researcher and production coordinator for Life Network, on one of the first magazine lifestyle shows in Canada.

In 1998, Young moved to CBC Television as a researcher for The National, CBC Television's flagship nightly newscast. She subsequently landed gigs as a local television news reporter in Toronto, Saskatoon and Regina.

Young returned to Toronto as a television anchor and reporter at Citytv, where she reported on the Space Shuttle Columbia disaster, the SARS crisis, and the Iraq War. In 2004, she became the anchor of Canada at Five on CBC Radio. She has hosted Main Street (PEI), The World at Six, CBC's flagship radio newscast World Report, and has been a guest host on As It Happens.

She was the first host of The World This Hour, has hosted The World This Weekend and The World at Six, and is currently a host of World Report. She was the weekend anchor of World Report for several years, until taking over as weekday anchor in November 2022.

== Charitable activities ==
Young is a supporter of child literacy in Canada and abroad.

She has also been a frequent host for community and charity-based organizations in the Greater Toronto Area including Design Hope Toronto's charity auction for Dixon Hall, the Osu Children's Library Fund, the Jamaican Canadian Association Scholarship Awards, the Applause Institute's Black Cotillion Ball, Jamaica College Old Boys' Association of Canada, CareerEdge Organization and the African Canadian Achievement Awards.

She is a former board member of Give Girls A Chance, a fundraising initiative created to provide educational opportunities for girls and young women in Canada and around the world.
