= Of Course I Love You ..! Till I Find Someone Better =

2008 novel by Durjoy Datta and Maanvi Ahuja

Of Course I Love You....
- Cover
- Author: Durjoy Datta, Maanvi Ahuja
- Language: English
- Genre: Fiction
- Publisher: Grapevine India Publishers
- Publication date: 2008
- Publication place: India
- Media type: Paperback
- Pages: 240
- ISBN: 978-81-922226-0-8

Of Course I Love You ..! Till I Find Someone Better is a 2008 novel written by Durjoy Datta and Maanvi Ahuja. The story revolves around the life of Deb, a student of Delhi College of Engineering, and is narrated in his voice.

== Synopsis ==
Of Course I Love You is set in Delhi, 2006–2008, and revolves around nightclubs, colleges, relationships, and friendships. Debashish "Deb" Roy is a college student who has dated and bedded many girls. He is happy until he forms a relationship with a female named Avantika. Deb's life becomes great as his relationship with Avantika deepens. But one day, Avantika is forced to listen to her spiritual "Guru" to leave Deb, ultimately dumping him. Deb is kicked out of his college placements and gets a job in a government office where his father used to work. He befriends the office genius Amit, who is inexperienced with girls, and waits for his life to improve and for Avantika to return to him. He even helps Amit to confess his love to Astha, And at last Avantika does return and says that she is ready to face whatever comes for them (Deb and Avantika) and will take responsibility of Deb.

== Characters ==
- Debashish (Deb) Roy
- Avantika (Deb's last Girlfriend)
- Smriti (Deb's ex-girlfriend)
- Vernita (Friend)
- Neeti
- Amit
- Shrey
- Tanmay (Avantika's brother)
- Astha
- Sonali (Deb's younger sister)
- Moushmi (Deb's elder sister)
- Shivam Asr
- Prajwal Mint (#1 Loves this book)
- Manika
