= Maureen Brosnahan =

Canadian journalist

Maureen Brosnahan is a Canadian journalist, best known as a former host of The World at Six on CBC Radio One. She is currently an investigative reporter for CBC News in both radio and television, concentrating primarily on health and social policy.

She won awards from the Canadian Association of Journalists in 2000 for her work as an investigative journalist, and from UFCW Canada in 2012 for her reporting on the economic and social challenges faced by agriculture workers in Canada.
