= Student Choice Initiative =

2019 Ontario government policy

The Student Choice Initiative ("SCI" or the "Initiative") was a 2019 policy of the Government of Ontario, under Premier Doug Ford, that took effect in Fall 2019 for the 2019-2020 academic year. The SCI provided post-secondary students to opt out of certain ancillary fees that post-secondary institutions collected on behalf of student groups, such as some student union dues. These applied to both universities and colleges. The Initiative was first struck down by the court in December 2019 by the Canadian Federation of Students - Ontario and the York Federation of Students. Since then, the SCI has not been in effect, and the Government lost a court appeal in August 2021.

== Origins of the initiative ==
On 17 January 2019, the Government announced the Student Choice Initiative. The policy gave students the ability to opt-out of non-essential ancillary fees in post-secondary, most notably a range of student union dues. The Government said that the full guidelines, when published, would exempt certain ancillary fees from the Initiative, notably those related to campus safety. Then-Minister of Training, Colleges, and Universities, Merrilee Fullerton, provided the following rationale behind the SCI: "Student fees in Ontario can range as high as $2,000 per year and, too often, force students to pay for services they do not use and organizations they do not support. We will ensure students have transparency and freedom of choice regarding the campus services and organizations which get access to their money."

=== Guidelines/policy directives released ===
In late-March 2019, the government released the Tuition Fee Framework and Ancillary Fee Guidelines for Universities, and the Tuition and Ancillary Fees Minister’s Binding Policy Directive for Colleges. The SCI was implemented in these two different documents, due to the statutory setup of the different institutions. In Ontario, each university is established under its own Act, whereas colleges are all established under the Ontario Colleges of Applied Arts and Technology Act, 2002. Aside from following two different documents, the impacts on ancillary fees were intended to be the same at both universities and colleges.

The Guidelines defined an "ancillary fee" as a fee imposed or administered by a given institution, or one of its constituent parts or its federated or affiliated institutions, in addition to regular tuition fees, which a student pays for a service or product. Different institutions also refer to these fees as incidental fees, supplementary fees, or auxiliary fees. The Guidelines created a distinction between compulsory and non-compulsory ancillary fees.

The guidelines deemed clubs, student unions, student transit passes, and student newspapers as non-essential. The guidelines obligated universities and colleges to offer methods of opting out of non-essential fees prior to the tuition payment deadline. The guidelines also enabled universities and colleges to deem some fees essential as long as they fell within pre-existing provincial frameworks (such as those relating to athletics and student identification cards).

=== Accompanying changes to domestic university tuition rates and OSAP ===
At the same time, the government announced several changes to other university fees, notably a 10% cut in domestic tuition fees, followed by a freeze in 2020-21, and significant cuts to the Ontario Student Assistance Program (OSAP). OSAP's budget would be cut from approximately $2 billion to $1,4 billion, and the government reduced the eligibility threshold for assistance and remove the six-month interest-free grace period for the Ontario portion of loans following graduation. The government also eliminated the grants for students from low-income families that covered the entire cost of tuition, requiring that the loan-to-grant ratio for funding given to students be composed of at least 50 percent loan.

== Permitted compulsory fees ==
The Guidelines for Universities and the Policy Directive for Colleges identified a common list of ancillary fees that could be made compulsory. These included:

- Athletics and recreation
- Career services
- Student buildings
- Health and counselling
- Academic support
- Student ID cards
- Student achievement and records
- Financial aid offices
- Campus safety programs

Health and dental plans could also be compulsory, if an opt-out was provided to students with pre-existing coverage. Transit passes could also be made compulsory if agreements with the relevant transit agency had been made prior to January 17, 2019. All other fees were required to be optional.

== Court challenges ==
The SCI was met with wide criticism, as discussed further below. In May 2019, the Canadian Federation of Students - Ontario and the York Federation of Students announced that they would be suing the government over the policy, arguing that it constituted interference in university affairs by the government.

=== Divisional Court ===
A three-judge panel of the Divisional Court heard the case on October 11, 2019. The University of Toronto Graduate Students' Union (UTGSU) and B'nai Brith also intervened and made submissions to the court. The UTGSU took a position aligned with that of the applicants, while B'nai Brith shared the province's position.

The Divisional Court issued its decision on November 21, 2019. The three-judge panel unanimously struck the SCI down, finding that the government had overstepped its authority over universities. The court also found that Policy Directive to colleges violated section 7 of the Ontario Colleges of Applied Arts and Technology Act, 2002, which states that nothing in that Act restricts a student governing body of a college elected by the students of the college from carrying out its normal activities, including policy directives of the Minister of Training, Colleges, and Universities.

Additionally, the ruling stated that:

"University and college student associations are private not-for profit corporations. Ontario does not fund these associations directly or indirectly. Ontario does not control these associations directly or indirectly. There is no statutory authority authorizing Cabinet or the Minister to interfere in the internal affairs of these student associations. The autonomy of universities, as private institutions, is fundamental to the academic freedom that is their hallmark."

=== Court of Appeal decision ===
In December 2019, the government announced that it would be appealing the Divisional Court's decision to the Court of Appeal for Ontario.

The UTGSU and B’nai Brith intervened again at the Court of Appeal, joined by many other institutions and groups. The other parties involved in intervening were Start Proud, Guelph Queer Equality, the University of Ottawa, Queen’s University, the Governing Council of the University of Toronto, the University of Waterloo, the University of Western Ontario, the Association for Canadian Clinical Legal Education, the Canadian Journalists for Free Expression, the Centre for Free Expression, the Canadian Association of Journalists, PEN Canada, World Press Freedom Canada, and the Canadian Association of University Teachers.

In August 2021, the court dismissed the government's appeal. Despite agreeing with the Divisional Court's conclusion, the Court of Appeal held that the Divisional Court had mischaracterized the Initiative's frame work as an exercise of prerogative power. Instead, the ancillary fees framework conflicted with the legislation that governs Ontario’s colleges and universities. The Court of Appeal held that the Acts for each university and the Ontario Colleges of Applied Arts and Technology Act, 2002 would have to have been amended.

On the nature of student associations, the decision noted that:

"Mandatory fees for student associations – collected by universities and remitted to the student associations – have been in place in universities since the 1960s. Student associations have joined umbrella provincial and/or national student organizations, which are similarly dependent on mandatory fees collected by the universities. This funding structure has permitted student associations to play important roles in university governance," (para 58). "Indeed, given the role played by student associations in university governance, the framework is a profound interference in university autonomy – not a mere fettering of the universities’ discretion, as the Minister submits. The Minister has no authority to fetter the exercise of the universities’ discretion concerning student associations in any event – again, not because universities are immune from regulation, but because the Legislature has chosen not to regulate them. Instead, the Legislature has chosen to establish the universities as autonomous entities, free from government interference in matters of internal governance. The Minister cannot exercise executive action in a manner that conflicts with the University Acts," (para 60).

The provincial government initially did not rule out a further appeal to the Supreme Court of Canada, but did not pursue one. The decision of the Court of Appeal for Ontario therefore stands and the SCI remains quashed.

== Campus groups' reaction to the initiative ==
The Initiative was met with mixed reactions, facing significant amounts of opposition from student groups that would be affected by the policy. Critics of the policy argued that it would harm campus life and campus services that students depended on, such as mental health, legal clinics, and LGBT+ services.

Other critics argued that the Initiative represented undue interference in education on the part of the government, particularly aimed at minimising groups that could oppose the government. Some critics also argued that it would undermine democracy on campuses, by disrupting the ability for students to collectively organise.

Supporters of the Initiative argued that it would force university and student institutions to be more efficient and more responsible with their budgets. Supporters also argued that allowing students to opt-out of non-tuition fees would make education more affordable and that students should not be forced to pay for services that they do not use. The policy received support among some campus free speech groups, notably the University of Ottawa Students for Free Speech club, who had lobbied the government to implement the policy in a meeting in August 2018. One member of this club brought an Anti-SLAPP motion against another uOttawa student for criticizing the Initiative and the Students for Free Speech club.

In a fundraising letter to Progressive Conservative Party supporters in mid-February 2019, Ford defended the Initiative, stating that students were being forced into joining unions against their will and that "I think we all know what kind of crazy Marxist nonsense student unions get up to. So, we fixed that."

== Impacts on student groups ==
=== Student governments ===
Several student governments in Ontario were forced to make a number of cuts. The Alma Mater Society of Queen's University reduced a number of paid positions to volunteer positions, placed the Queen’s Model Parliament under probation, and announced that it was reconsidering its membership of the Ontario Undergraduate Student Alliance. At Laurentian University, the Students' General Association predicted a 40% cut to the operations budget and stated that they would be unable to continue supporting clubs financially.

In some cases, the Initiative led to an increase in cost incurred by students, as campus groups had to raise prices in order to minimise losses from opt-outs. At Laurentian University, for instance, the fee for Welcome Week activities increased from 20$ to 115$. Critics of the policy also argued that targeting student union fees would fail to make university more affordable, as those fees were usually relatively small compared to tuition and student residence fees.

=== Student journalism ===
The Initiative received particular criticism from student journalism, as student newspapers and radios were considered non-essential and hence faced potentially significant budget cuts. At Ryerson University, the student paper The Eyeopener faced an opt-out rate of over 55% of students.

Considering that local journalism as a whole was experiencing a period of significant decline in Canada, concerns were raised about the effect the Initiative would have on the freedom of the press, accountability and transparency in universities, and on the future of journalism. Concerns were also raised about newspapers in minority languages, such as the French-language La Rotonde at the University of Ottawa.

Some critics also noted that student newspaper were often the only major source of coverage for events at universities, despite universities playing major roles in the economies and cultures of Ontario. The Canadian University Press released a statement opposing the Initiative, noting that "it will be up to the institutions to decide if the very media that covers them is essential."

During August and September 2019, student newspapers and radios across the province ran campaigns to try and convince students not to opt-out, with many predicting as much as a 50% reduction in budget, especially as they would have to relaunch the campaigns all over again come the winter semester. Some newspapers announced changes to their publications, with some stopping the printing of physical copies, some reducing the frequency of publication, and others shifting to a podcast/newsletter format.

In October 2019, a number of student newspaper published an editorial in the Toronto Star decrying the cuts, stating that:

"Without a free and healthy student press, students across the province lack a platform to share the stories that make our campuses such vibrant places to learn and grow. If the student press slows to a standstill, thousands of voices of a wide and diverse range will be silenced, and the ideas and arguments that grow from our work might never come to life in the first place."

== See also ==
- Premiership of Doug Ford
- List of Canadian students' associations
