= Acropolis Institute of Pharmaceutical Education and Research =

Private college in Indore, Madhya Pradesh, India

- Type: Private
- Established: 2005
- Affiliations: Rajiv Gandhi Proudyogiki Vishwavidyalaya, Devi Ahilya Vishwavidyalaya
- Chairman: Ashok Kumar Sojatia
- Principal: G. N. Darwhekar
- Academic staff: 500+
- Administrative staff: 100+
- Students: 1500+
- Location: Indore, Dewas Bypass, Mangliya Square, Madhya Pradesh, India; 22.819186°N 75.942596°E
- Website: aiper.ac.in

Acropolis Institute of Pharmaceutical Education and Research (AIPER) is a private college located in Indore, Madhya Pradesh, India. It was established in 2005. The college is affiliated to Rajiv Gandhi Proudyogiki Vishwavidyalaya and it is part of Acropolis Group.

== Notable alumni ==
- Nikita Singh
