= Kerr Hall =

Building at Toronto Metropolitan University, Canada

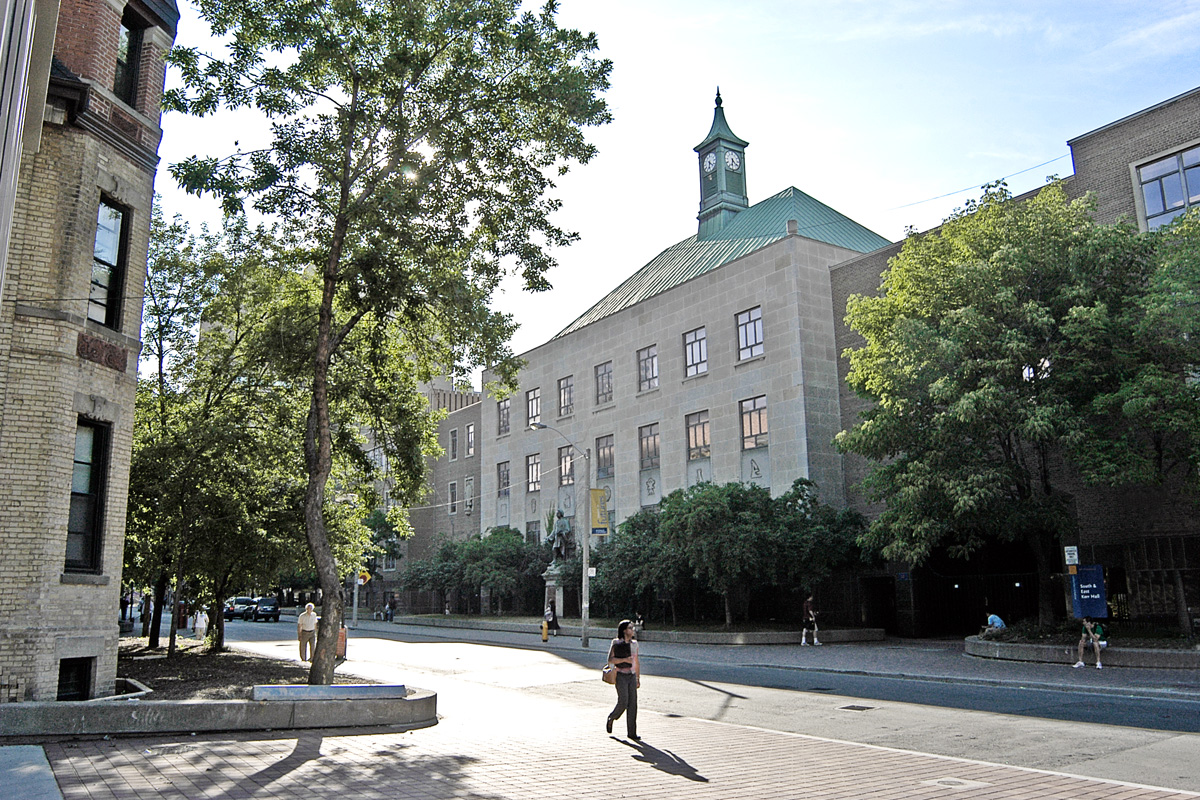
- The clocktower at Kerr Hall South in 2009
- Interactive map of the Kerr Hall area

General information
- Location: Kerr Hall North: 31 and 43 Gerrard Street East; Kerr Hall East: 340 Church Street and 60 Gould Street; Kerr Hall South: 40 and 50 Gould Street; Kerr Hall West: 379 Victoria Street, Toronto, Ontario, Canada
- Construction started: 1958
- Completed: 1963
- Owner: Toronto Metropolitan University

Design and construction
- Architecture firm: S.B. Coon & Son

Other information
- Public transit access: TMU station; 505 Dundas; 97C Yonge

Kerr Hall is a series of four buildings in the Garden District of Toronto, on the campus of Toronto Metropolitan University. The four buildings form a quadrangle, at the centre of which is a community park, known as the Kerr Hall Quad.

Named for the first principal of the Ryerson Institute of Technology, Howard Hillen Kerr, the buildings are situated on the former site of the Toronto Normal School, known as St. James Square. The original normal school building and the land it sat on was acquired by the institute when it opened in 1948, after which it was renamed to Ryerson Hall. Kerr Hall was built at the edges of St. James Square, with Ryerson Hall being demolished as the individual buildings were built. The only remnant of Ryerson Hall now is the façade, which serves as an entrance to the university's athletics centre.

== History ==
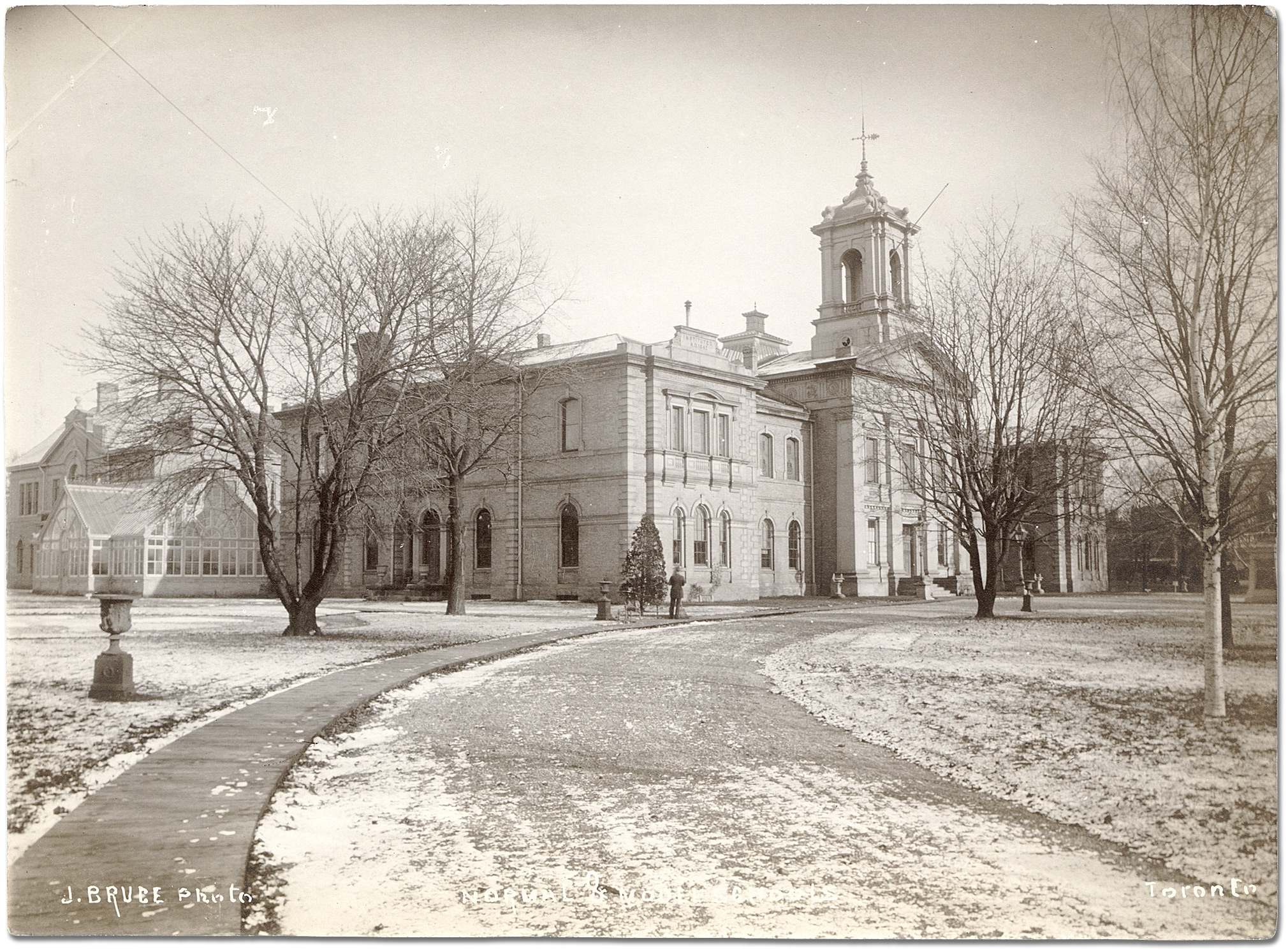
The Toronto Normal School sat on the site that is now the Kerr Hall Quad

The site currently occupied by the Kerr Hall buildings was known as St. James Square, and was home to the Toronto Normal School starting in 1848. During World War II, the Normal School relocated, and the building was used as a training centre for the Royal Canadian Air Force. After the war, Howard Hillen Kerr started the Ryerson Institute of Technology, now known as Toronto Metropolitan University, operating out of the building. The building was renamed to Ryerson Hall, after Egerton Ryerson, the man who founded the Normal School on that land.

After a few years of operation, Ryerson Hall proved to be too small for the institute's use cases, and so in 1958, construction started on a series of buildings that would outline St. James Square. The buildings, which were designed by the architectural firm S.B. Coon & Son, were built in phases, so as to maximize the use out of Ryerson Hall, as the building would slowly get demolished. By 1964, the four buildings had been completed, and all but the façade of Ryerson Hall remained. The four buildings were called Kerr Hall, after Howard Hillen Kerr. The new open area in the middle of the quadrangle would be known as the Kerr Hall Quad. The façade of the Normal School would be used as the entrance to the institute's athletic centre, built underneath the quad and opened in 1987.

== Buildings ==
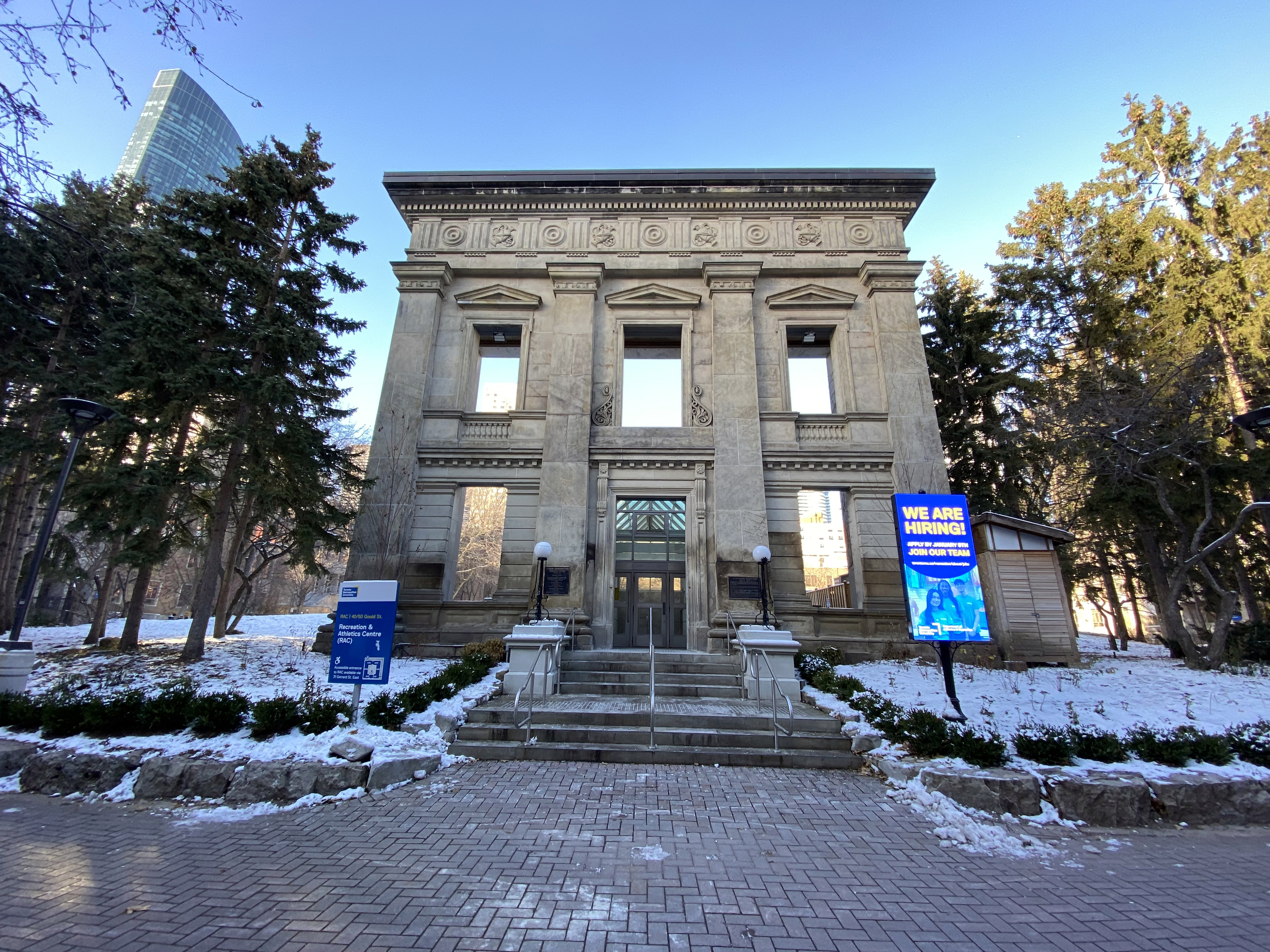
The façade of the Toronto Normal School serves as entrance to the Recreation and Athletics Centre

Kerr Hall is divided into 4 buildings, one for each side of the quadrangle. Each of the buildings are named for the cardinal direction they are in, and the whole complex is bound by Gerrard Street to the north, Church Street to the east, Gould Street to the south, and Nelson Mandela Walk to the west. Because of this, the 4 buildings have different addresses. The buildings are connected from the inside, however not all the buildings are connected to each other on the same floors. The portion of Gould Street that is outside Kerr Hall is closed to vehicle traffic.

The buildings are home to classrooms and department offices, as well as lockers for students. The buildings also have other features that are used by the university and the community. Atop Kerr Hall East is a broadcast antenna that's not in use anymore, but used to be used by the RTA School of Media, and Kerr Hall South hosts a large clock tower that rings out every hour. There are two gyms in Kerr Hall West, one on the 2nd floor and one in the basement. The Recreation and Athletics Centre is located under the quad and is accessible using the entrance or by a ramp in Kerr Hall North. Kerr Hall North is home to the Chrysalis Theatre operated by the Creative School.

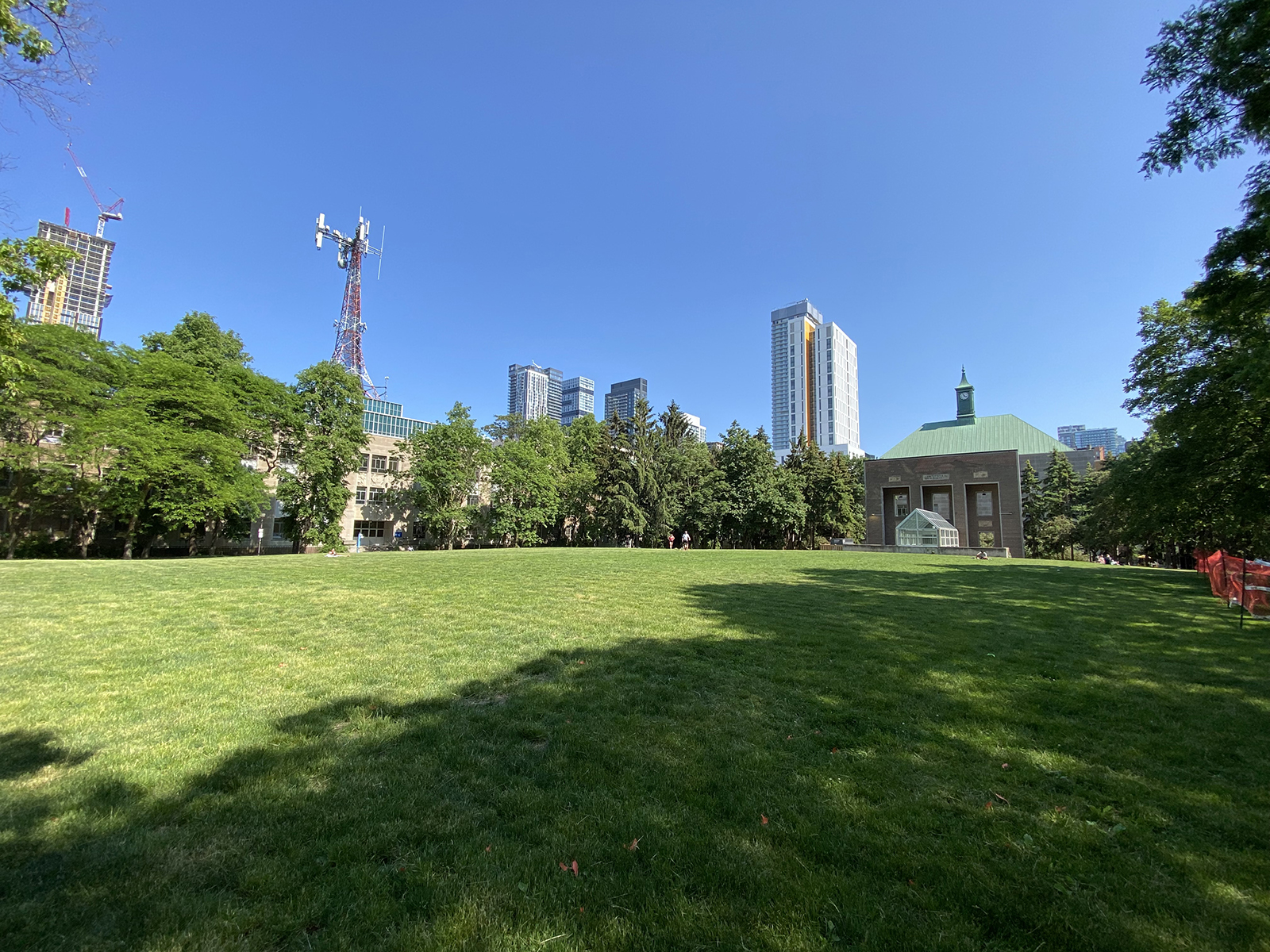
Kerr Hall Quad with the broadcase antenna on Kerr Hall East visible

The quad is a large green space with brick footpaths and is located in the middle of the quadrangle. The quad is open to the public as the Toronto Metropolitan University Community Park. The space is also used for various events hosted by the university or by the community.

=== The Creative School Chrysalis ===
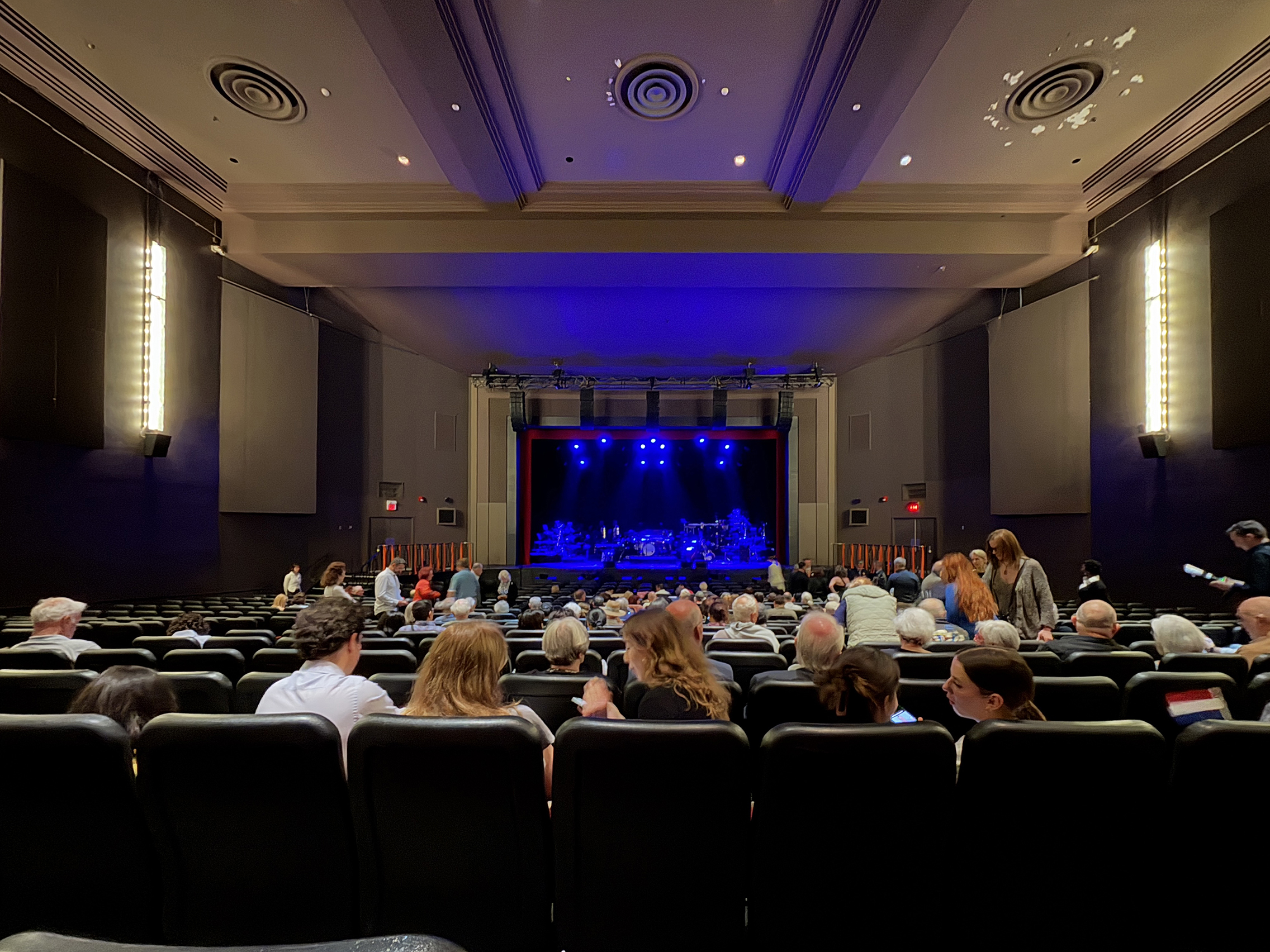
The Chrysalis

Kerr Hall North is home to the Chrysalis at the Creative School. Formerly known as the Ryerson Theatre, the 1,237-seat multidisciplinary performance space is used as an innovation hub, designed to boost Toronto's creative sector.

Historically, the Ryerson Theatre was one of the screening venues used by the Toronto International Film Festival. In this capacity, Chrysalis has hosted the premieres of The Princess Bride in 1987 and Borat in 2006 The venue also hosted the 1976 Juno Awards and the 29th Canadian Film Awards.

Chrysalis is also home to the productions created by Toronto Metropolitan University's Performance Acting, Dance, and Production & Design programs.
