= If It's Not Forever =

2012 novel by Durjoy Datta and Nikita Singh

If It's Not Forever!
- Book cover
- Author: Durjoy Datta, Nikita Singh
- Cover artist: Creative Station
- Language: English
- Genre: Thriller; Suspense; Romance
- Published: 2012 by Grapevine India Publishers
- Publication place: India
- Pages: 239
- ISBN: 9789381841037

If It's Not Forever is a novel by Durjoy Datta and Nikita Singh. It was published in the year 2012 by Grapevine India Publishers. It is set on the story of the 2011 Delhi High Court blasts. Though mentioned as a love story, it is more of a suspense thriller. There are seven characters mentioned in this book, with the main protagonist being Debashish (Deb), who hails from Bengal and is deeply scarred with haunting memories of the blast. The book has received average reviews from critics all over India.

== Plot ==
"My breathing is still ragged. Each breath I take and release hurts a little more. I feel choked and my head burns. I feel sick of the haunting images that spin round my head"

— Durjoy Datta

The author starts off with memories of the blast day. Deb had survived the bomb attack that left eighty nine people injured and many people dead. He feels sick at home and could not help wipe away the evil memories of the day. He recites the tragic event repeatedly to Avantika, his girlfriend. Avantika loves him and also feels bad, but she tries her best to make him forget what had happened. Quoting from the book, Deb says, "It could have been me". Deb is said to work at a publishing house "that publishes trash novels". His co-worker is named as Shrey, who is addicted towards girls and cannot live without them.

He finally recovers from it. He wants to seek redemption as he stood there, on the blast day, watching the victims die. He finds a diary while re-visiting the area, and the edge of the diary is burnt beyond recognition. He takes it home and reads it. The diary has "R.D" written on it. No name, or for that matter address, is provided. But Deb wants to return the diary to Ragini, who "R.D" loved.

Most of the novel revolves around the trio (Avantika, Shrey, Deb) and a girl named Tiya, travelling in an old car. They travel and the secrets come back to life. From Dehradun to Mumbai, the novel covers most of the Indian metropolitan cities. In the beginning of the novel the trio's daily life is described. Shrey is reported to work at Grapevine India, and often goes out to "meet someone from the Times". Deb knows that Shrey is actually meeting new girls. It is also highlighted in the novel that Avantika, Deb's girlfriend, hates the company of Shrey's girlfriend Tiya. Tiya is said to be stupid and crazy.

Deb doesn't reveal anything about the diary to anyone. He reads the diary and decides to find Ragini so she could know about R.D's true feelings. He plans a road trip with Shrey to Dehradun where R.D and his best friend were studying. They reach Dehradun where Deb goes to Imperial academy to search for R.D's best friend who was listed as an all rounder of that year. He finds his name is Piyush Makhija and an address of Haridwar. When he comes back to hotel he finds out that Tiya is crashing their trip and deeply misses Avantika. Next day they reach Haridwar, Avantika surprises Deb by coming their and spends time with him. She asks him what is he hiding from her and learns about the diary. She decides to join him in this journey to find Ragini. They go to the address only to find an abandoned house. They meet Piyush's father who gives them Piyush's contact and his office address in Bhopal. When they come back to the hotel they find out that Shrey and Tiya went on their separate road trip giving the reason that Tiya is not comfortable with Avantika's strict behaviour and views about drinking. Avantika gets upset about it and decides to return to Delhi. While Deb was waiting for her she changed her mind and abandoned her heavy luggage signifying that she is going to be the carefree Avantika during this road trip. They go to Bhopal in search of Piyush. They meet him and finds 'the dead guy's' name, Ritam Dey. Piyush informs them that he had absolutely no contact with Ritam after school as his girlfriend Sumi was in love with Ritam. Deb and Avantika travels to Gandhinagar where Ritam's disabled sister Nivedita was admitted in a mental asylum. Coincidentally when they are staying at a hotel in Gandhinagar, police raids their hotel because they found Shrey and Tiya having sex in the balcony. They saved them by stepping in and giving statement that Tiya isn't minor, they are from media and she is their intern.

Deb and Avantika visits the mental asylum in the morning to meet Nivedita where they find out that she is not reacting to their treatment and will loose complete hope if no one will visit her. This ignites something inside Deb and Avantika to find Ragini as soon as possible. Apparently Shrey and Tiya followed Deb and Avantika as they were getting suspicious over this trip. Shrey takes the information from emergency contact list of Nivedita and confronts Deb about the diary. After listening the whole story Shrey and Tiya decide to join them in their quest. They take a train to Mumbai where Sumi (emergency contact of Nivedita) stays. Tiya contacts Sumi and they plan a meeting. Sumi is informed about Ritam's death over which she starts crying. Sumi confessed how she was very upset when she found that Ritam is in love with Ragini. She started avoiding him but one day she got a call from unknown number who turned out to be Ritam. They all knew it was Nigel's landline as Ritam had made a diary entry on that incident.

They all travelled to Bangalore where Ragini and Ritam came for internship as Ragini wanted to live with her boyfriend Nigel for summer vacation. They called Nigel's house and were informed that Nigel is admitted into a rehabilitation center. They all visit Nigel where he shares how sorry he is for ruining Ragini's life by forcing her to start drinking and doing drugs. He said he knew Ritam loved her and told her about the same but she never took him seriously. Nigel gives them a greeting card which was from Ragini. The card was from Mumbai. They all return to Mumbai to the address written on the card.

Everyone is shocked to see that the house belongs to Ritam and not Ragini. Apparently after the drug overdose Ragini was deeply ashamed by her actions and cut all the ties with Ritam. Ritam couldn't bear to keep his feelings bottled up and sent his diary to Ragini. Seeing that Ritam is alive everyone concludes that the one who died is not Ritam but Ragini. Ritam is devastated.

After few months Deb receives a letter from Ritam where he describes how painful it is to live as Nivedita passed away too. The letter was written after he took a syringe of extremely strong drug and wrote that he is going to take another dose thus ending his life. Thinking Ritam is dead the gang decides to head to Mumbai. Before they could plan any further Deb receives call from Ritam much to everyone's shock. He said he is Delhi and wants to meet them. When they reach to the house Deb observes that this is exactly the kind of house he imagined Ragini would live in. Ritam explains how he survived his suicide attempt and took it as a sign that Ragini and Nivedita wanted him alive. He called Ragini's parents after that and discovered that Ragini is alive. She survived the blast but was severely burnt. They met Ragini who was burnt beyond recognition. Ritam said he was going to propose her soon even though she might reject as doctors predicted she won't survive long time.

Epilogue shows how Shrey and Tiya are in love and shares a serious relationship. Ritam is still trying to convince Ragini and how Deb wrote the book on their story.

== Characters ==
- Deb: He is the main protagonist. He is said to work at Grapevine India publishers along with Shrey.
- Avantika: She is Deb's girlfriend/fiancée for five years. She plays a significant role in the book.
- Shrey: The author describes him as addicted to sex and girls. Shrey is witty and intelligent and is very hard to get along with.
- Tiya: Shrey's girlfriend. The author portrays her to be immature and not sensible.
- Ritam: The owner of the diary and the lover of Ragini.
- Ragini: The heroine of the novel. .
- Nigel: Ragini's ex-boyfriend.
- Sumi: Ritam's ex-girlfriend.
- Nivedita: The physically-cum-mentally challenged sister of Ritam. She was left alone by her parents, and only his brother Ritam came to attend her. She was placed in a mental hospital located in Gandhinagar, Gujarat.

== Critical review ==
If It's Not Forever received fairly average to good reviews. Youth24x7, on their review, said, "Looking at ‘If it’s not forever, it’s not love’ will definitely make one think that it is one of those mushy love stories but what distinguishes this book from them is the way Durjoy Datta and Nikita Singh have given a new sensitive angle to the story by presenting the protagonist as a bomb blast victim striving to achieve redemption". Online blogs state it as a book that should be read by readers who are patient enough. Justlife reviewer Heena Joshi wrote, "Love could not have better sketch ever than the one depicted in this novel. The novel obviously has the common facet of young love, relationships & sex. But what sets it apart from others is the humanity; humanity towards the loss of some unknown; empathy with that person’s life and plight; relevance to other’s dreams and a dream to fulfill that unknown’s dream, a pain for other’s plight and loving your loved ones and making them feel this coziness and warmth throughout your life so that you don’t need to repent or think, “Why couldn’t I express them when I was alive”."

Stories In Moments gives 4 stars and writes, "It’s a captivating read. More than once I felt like jumping to the last chapter as it was getting difficult for me to wait to know about the fate of the diary. The ‘present-tense-narration’ makes the story more intriguing and mysterious. Also the real life mentions like Grapevine and company funds etc. make you feel more emotionally connected to the story. The swaps between Deb's story and Dead Man's story have been used wonderfully. There isn't a single episode when story loses its grip. But what sets the mercury soaring are the final 70 pages where every page greets you with a new revelation, a new heart break, and a new hope at the same time."
