= Review of Journalism =

Canadian student-produced magazine

- Editor: Prarthana Pathak (Fall 2023-Spring 2024)
- Categories: Student magazine Journalism Review
- Frequency: Yearly
- First issue: Spring (April) 1984
- Company: Toronto Metropolitan University
- Country: Canada
- Based in: Toronto, Ontario
- Language: English
- Website: reviewofjournalism.ca
- ISSN: 0838-0651

The Review of Journalism (formerly the Ryerson Review of Journalism) is a Canadian magazine, published annually by final-year journalism students at Toronto Metropolitan University. The magazine profiles personalities, issues and controversies in Canadian media. In addition to the features in the printed magazine, weekly online features and a daily blog are maintained by the staff of the Review. The magazine's mandate has, from the very beginning, asked What does this mean for Canadian journalism now?

Don Obe, who was chair of then-Ryerson's journalism school in mid-1983, began planning for a student-produced magazine project. The first issue of the Ryerson Review of Journalism was printed in April 1984.

The magazine has won a number of National Magazine Awards, as well as citations by Rolling Stone and Utne Reader and a number of awards from the Association of Educators in Journalism and Mass Communication.

In 2021, what was then Ryerson University's school of journalism announced that it would be renaming the publication as well as The Ryersonian before the 2021–2022 school year to remove any reference to Egerton Ryerson, an architect of the Canadian Indian residential school system. The 2021 winter semester issue was published as [ ] Review of Journalism, using brackets to elide Ryerson's name from the title; one day after a vigil was held on campus commemorating 215 suspected dead Indigenous children found at Kamloops Indian Residential School, the school announced plans to permanently rename the magazine.

In September 2021, it was announced that the publication's new name is the Review of Journalism.

In 2024, the magazine will turn 40 years old. The Review of Journalism will launch a special 40th-year edition.
