= Nikita Singh =

Indian writer (born 1991)

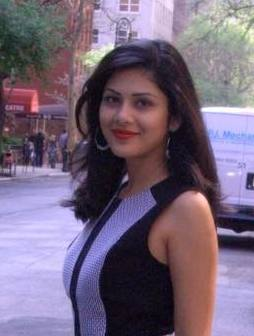
- Nikita Singh Bihar (2016)
- Born: 6 October 1991 (age 34); Ranchi, Then Bihar Now Jharkhand , India
- Education: Master of Fine Arts – Creative Writing Bachelor of Pharmacy
- Occupation: Writer
- Years active: 2011 – present
- Known for: Author of Every Time It Rains, Someone Like You, Like a Love Song
- Spouse: Nick Sheridan (m. 2022)
- Website: nikitasbooks.com

Nikita Singh (born 6 October 1991) is an Indian writer. She has written twelve books including The Reason is You, Every Time It Rains, Like a Love Song, The Promise and After All This Time. She has also edited and contributed to an anthology of stories titled 25 Strokes of Kindness. Her 2016 novel, Like a Love Song, debuted at No. 2 at Hindustan Times Bestseller list. In the following year, Every Time It Rains, debuted on No. 7 on the same list.

== Early life and career ==
Nikita Singh was born in Ranchi, Jharkhand, where she spent the first four years of her life. She then relocated to Indore, where she went to a primary school. She completed her schooling at Bridgeford School, Ranchi, in 2008. She graduated in pharmacy at the Acropolis Institute of Pharmaceutical Education and Research in Indore in 2012. She then moved to New York for a Masters of Fine Arts in creative writing from The New School, New York City, from where she graduated in 2016. In 2022 she married an American husband and is currently residing in Brooklyn, New York.

She signed a contract with Penguin Books India in 2011 and also joined Grapevine India as an editor. She wrote her first book Love @ Facebook when 19 years old and was studying pharmacy. Love @ Facebook is a young adult book about a nineteen-year-old girl, who falls in love with a VJ, after befriending him on Facebook. Under the pseudonym Sidharth Oberoi, she has also contributed to the books in The Backbenchers series, by editing the first book and writing the second book of the series, The Backbenchers: The Missed Call, which was released in June 2012.

Huffpost called Singh "India's Leading Romance Writer" in an expansive profile done on the writer in 2017. The Hindu called her "the Goddess of Racy Reads" in an article. Singh received a Live India Young Achievers Award in 2013 and was nominated for a First International Young Author Award, held in April 2018 in UAE.

In September 2011, the sequel to Singh’s Love @ Facebook, Accidentally In Love..With Him? Again? was published. The novel is aimed at an older audience than Love @ Facebook. In February 2012, If It's Not Forever...It's Not Love, was published. The book is about a real-life incident, the 2011 Delhi High Court blast, which occurred on 7 September 2011. The protagonist of the book was there when the blast happened. He stumbles upon a half-burnt diary, which had a love story written in it and decides to chase it. Nikita also edited an anthology, 25 Strokes of Kindness.

Singh has also spoken on various TEDx conferences in colleges and top business schools across India. She also worked as an editor in Grapevine India. Her book, Like a Love Song, was released in March 2016. This was followed by Every Time It Rains, which was released in February 2017. In February 2018, her book, Letters To My Ex, was released and sold widely across the Indian subcontinent. Her most recent novel, The Reason Is You, was released in February 2019.

== Personal life ==
Nikita has an elder brother, Nishant. In 2022, Nikita married Nick Sheridan, who is Senior Technical Program Manager at Sonos in New York.

== Bibliography ==
- Love @ Facebook (2011)
- Accidentally in Love (2011)
- The Backbenchers: The Missed Call (part of The Backbenchers series, 2012), under the pseudonym Sidharth Oberoi
- If It's Not Forever… It's Not Love (2012)
- The Promise (2012)
- 25 Strokes of Kindness (2013)
- Someone Like You (2013)
- The Unreasonable Fellows (2013)
- Right Here Right Now (2014)
- The Turning Point: Best of Young Indian Writers (2014)
- After All This Time (2015)
- Like A Love Song (2016)
- Every Time It Rains (2017)
- Letters To My Ex (2018)
- The Reason is You (2019)
- What Do You See When You Look In The Mirror? (2021)

== See also ==
- List of Indian writers
