= Christopher Moloney =

Canadian writer and photographer (born 1977)

Christopher Moloney is a Canadian writer and photographer. He is best known for his ongoing rephotography project entitled FILMography.

== Biography ==
Moloney was born in the Toronto suburb of York, Ontario, Canada. He attended St. Anthony Elementary School and North Park Secondary School in Brampton, Ontario. He studied radio and television arts at Ryerson University in Toronto.

== Career ==
After earning his degree, Moloney moved to New York City to work in television, most notably the Late Show with David Letterman and Erin Burnett OutFront.

In June 2012, he began experimenting with an on-location layering technique of holding up a black-and-white printout of a scene from a movie and taking another photograph.

The critics are divided on his work. Flare praised Moloney for "flawlessly [lining] up every brick in a building and curb on the street to make the visuals look as one" while The Atlantic was more critical, noting "the buildings don’t always line up perfectly; the colors seldom match"

His photographs have been featured by a number of magazines including Esquire, Complex, Wired, Fast Company, and Vanity Fair.

In 2013, his photographs were part of exhibitions during the Cannes Film Festival and Ischia Film Festival.

In December 2011, Moloney was interviewed by The New York Times for an article called "Dark Days Behind It, Central Park Pulses at Night". During the interview, Moloney referred to Central Park as "boringly safe". The phrase caught on and, when the article was reprinted by other media outlets, it was included in the headline. Shortly after the article ran in The New York Times, New York magazine criticized Moloney's comments in a column called "Central Park Not Nearly As Rape-y at Night As It Used to Be".

== Notable photographs ==
- Annie Hall (1977)
- The Avengers (2012)
