= On the Record (newspaper) =

Student newspaper at Toronto Metropolitan University, Canada

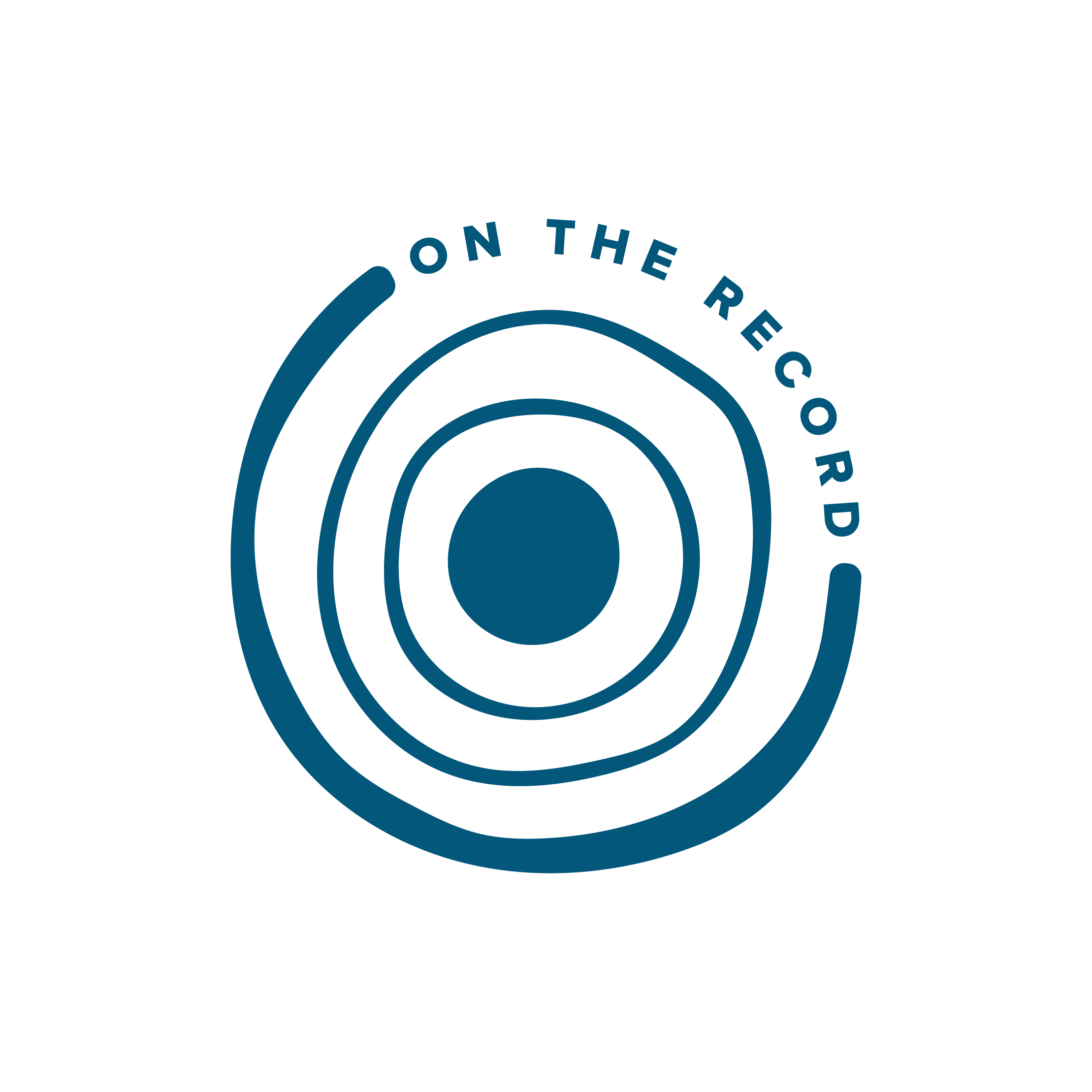
- Type: Student newspaper
- School: Toronto Metropolitan University
- Owner(s): School of Journalism, Toronto Metropolitan University
- Founded: 1948; 78 years ago
- City: Toronto, Ontario
- Country: Canada
- ISSN: 0841-2766
- OCLC number: 1007461240
- Website: ontherecordnews.ca

On The Record (formerly The Ryersonian) is the masthead news title produced by journalism students at Toronto Metropolitan University in Toronto, Canada. Students produce daily news for the publication's website, live-blog local events relevant to students and broadcast TV news, also available on the website, at least once a week.

Select news content is also published, in print, once a week, and distributed on campus on Wednesdays throughout the school year.

On The Record accepts submissions from the entire Toronto Metropolitan University student body. It's also a "capstone course" - meaning it's one of several paths through the final year of the Bachelor of Journalism program for students. Students who take this path edit, produce and write for the masthead in either a part time or full-time basis for one term. Students in the Master's of Journalism program can also take this path.

== History ==
In 2010, The Ryersonian began tweeting from @theryersonian and developed a Facebook page, The Ryersonian.

At the start of the 2011 academic year, The Ryersonian transformed into a title that aims to produce news and features in all media to meet the needs of students in a new curriculum that had retired the old print, TV and online streams to better reflect the way media are evolving globally.

Several editions in the 2006–07 year addressed issues of on-campus racial tension. In November 2006, it was reported that a group called "I'm a White Minority @ Ryerson" was formed on Facebook, the popular online networking site. The controversy snowballed as known white supremacist, and leader of the Nationalist Party of Canada Don Andrews, a Ryerson alum, was profiled on the front page of the March 21 edition. He defended the Facebook group's rights to form a white culture student group.

Some criticized the paper for the story's poor timing, as March 21 is also the International Day for the Elimination of Racism. The Eyeopener, TMU's other student newspaper and competitor to the Ryersonian, ran an editorial critical of the Ryersonian's coverage and ran a spoof issue lampooning the coverage of racists by the Ryersonian.

In response, students and members of the RSU conducted a one-time protest by gathering up editions of the paper and dumping them in front of the Ryersonian's office. A blog known as Ryersonian Watch was also set up by an anonymous student. The blog only contained a handful of posts highly critical of The Ryersonian and sympathetic to the paper's competitor, The Eyeopener. The controversy led members of the Ryerson Students' Union to call for harsher restrictions on what could be published in the Ryersonian. However, since The Ryersonian is produced by students of TMU's journalism school and has no connection financially or editorially from the RSU, the move was seen as a way to retaliate against prior coverage that didn't show the RSU in a positive light.

Furthermore, a debate was held between Judy Rebick and the managing editor of The Ryersonian to discuss the reasons between how and why the article was published. The debate helped to explain the editorial reasoning as to why editors at the newspaper decided that the Facebook group and Don Andrews were worth covering and helped to eliminate any notion that The Ryersonian was biased in any way in its reporting.

In June 2021, what was then Ryerson University's school of journalism announced that it would be renaming the publication as well as the Ryerson Review of Journalism before the 2021–2022 school year to remove any reference to Egerton Ryerson, an architect of the Canadian Indian residential school system. The announcement was made a day after a vigil was held on campus commemorating 215 dead Indigenous children found at Kamloops Indian Residential School.

In September 2021, the newspaper changed its name to On The Record.

== See also ==
- List of student newspapers in Canada
- List of newspapers in Canada
