= Susan Bonner =

Canadian radio and television journalist

- Born: 1963 (age 62–63); Montreal, Quebec
- Occupations: radio and television journalist
- Known for: The World at Six

Susan Bonner (born 1963) is a Canadian radio and television journalist. She was noted for being the lead anchor of CBC Radio One's The World at Six from 2014 until 2026.

Originally from Montreal, Quebec, Bonner studied journalism at Ryerson University. She joined the Canadian Broadcasting Corporation in 1985 as an intern, and worked for the CBC's stations in Saskatoon, Calgary, Halifax and Montreal before joining the national news division as a political correspondent in Ottawa.

From 2009 to 2013, she was posted to the network's Washington, D.C. bureau. She succeeded Alison Smith as anchor of The World at Six in September 2014. She resigned from the CBC on 26 March 2026 after 41 years with the corporation, with the sign off "over and out", after a 5-minute resumé of her professional career, voice breaking, from Your World Tonight (the new name of The World at Six).
