= Donna E. Young =

Canadian legal academic

Donna E. Young is a Canadian legal academic, the Dean of the Lincoln Alexander School of Law at Toronto Metropolitan University and a former distinguished professor at Albany Law School.

== Early life ==
Young was born to a mother from Jamaica and father from Belize. She grew up in the North York district of Toronto.

== Education ==
Young has a bachelor's degree in psychology from the University of Toronto, a bachelor of laws from Osgoode Hall Law School at York University and a master's of laws from Columbia Law School.

== Career ==
Young became the founding dean of the Lincoln Alexander School of Law at Ryerson University (now the Toronto Metropolitan University) on January 1, 2020. Prior to that she was the Albany Law School's President William McKinley Distinguished Professor of Law and Public Policy where she taught about employment law, criminal law, US federal civil procedure, gender and work, and race, rape culture and law.

Before her academic career, Young worked for Cornish Roland Canadian employment law firm, the City of New York Mayor's Office, and at the Ontario Human Rights Commission.
