= Lincoln Alexander School of Law =

Law school of Toronto Metropolitan University

- Parent school: Toronto Metropolitan University
- Established: 2020
- School type: Public law school
- Dean: Donna E. Young
- Location: Toronto, Ontario, Canada
- Enrolment: 436 (2025)
- Faculty: 75 (2025)
- Website: www.torontomu.ca/law/

The Lincoln Alexander School of Law is the law school of Toronto Metropolitan University in Toronto, Ontario, Canada. As of 2025, it is the newest law school in Canada, with its first cohort of students matriculated in 2020 and graduating in 2023. The school is named after Lincoln Alexander, the first Black Canadian to become a Member of Parliament and Cabinet Minister in the House of Commons of Canada.

Alongside Lakehead University's Bora Laskin Faculty of Law, it is one of two universities in Ontario offering an Integrated Practice Curriculum (IPC). The IPC integrates articling into the three year Juris Doctor program, thus allowing students to write the bar exam directly after graduation.

== History ==
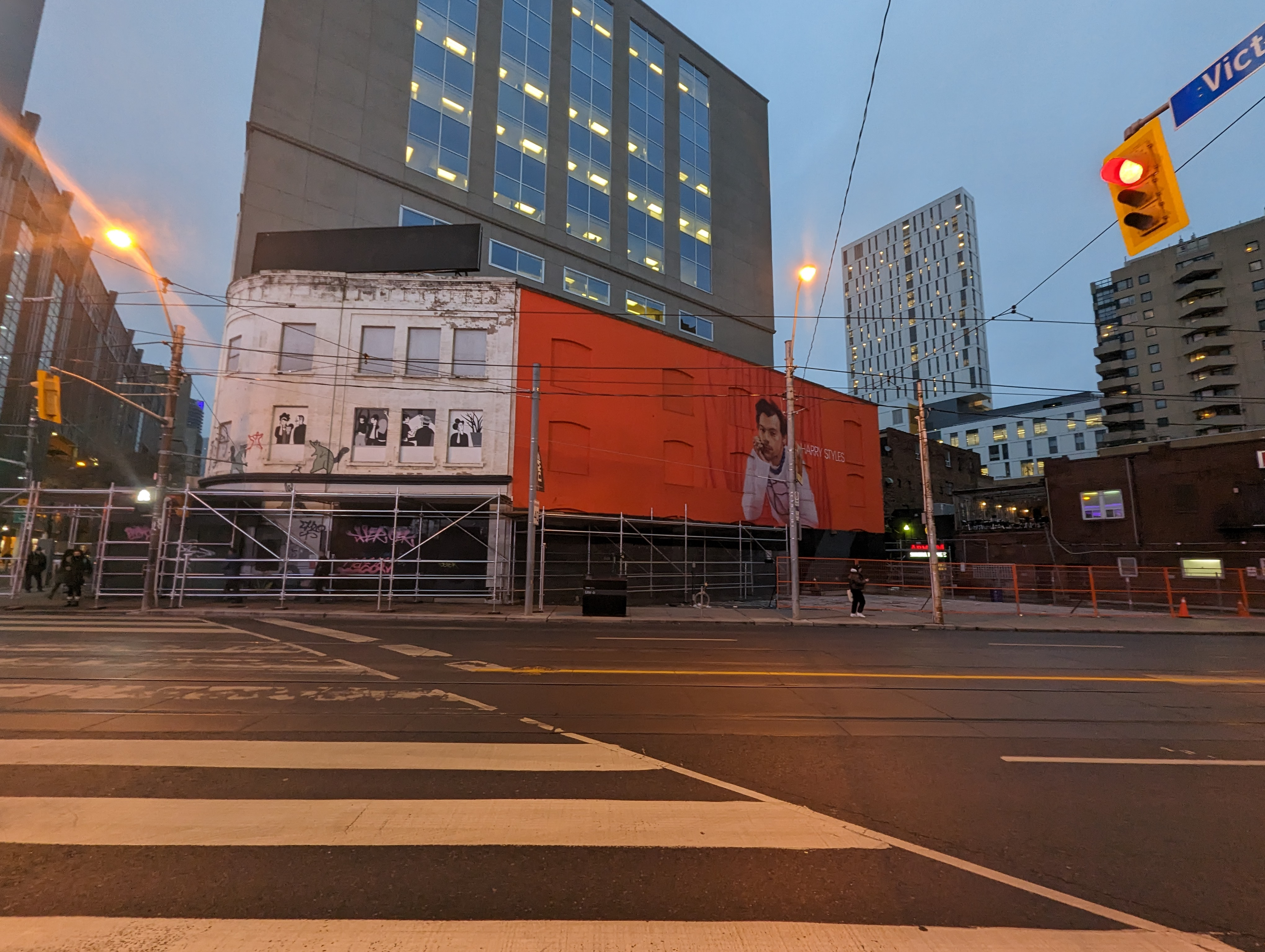
277 Victoria Street, the future home of the school, pictured in 2023

In 2017, the Ontario Universities Council on Quality Assurance and the Federation of Law Societies of Canada endorsed a proposal from Toronto Metropolitan University (then named Ryerson University) to implement a common law degree program. The proposal received further endorsement from the Law Society of Ontario in February 2018, the final governing body required to move forward with the program's development.

In December 2018, it was announced that prospective students would not be eligible to receive funding from the Ontario Student Assistance Program (OSAP), due to the provincial government arguing that the province already had "more lawyers graduating from its seven law schools than there are articling positions available," though the university announced that it planned to move forward regardless. However, in October 2019, it was announced that the university had secured OSAP funding for the program, allowing it to operate without raising tuition.

In December 2019, Canadian academic Donna E. Young was announced as the school's inaugural dean, succeeding interim dean Anver Saloojee.

A virtual ribbon-cutting ceremony, led by then-Mayor John Tory, was held on September 30, 2020. The ceremony was held virtually due to COVID-19 restrictions in place at the time.

In April 2021, the school was officially renamed in honour of Lincoln Alexander.

In October 2023, in response to the October 7th attacks on Israel by Hamas and the ensuing Gaza War, an open letter declaring support for Palestine was signed by approximately 70 students (primarily coming from the School of Law). The letter received backlash from Israeli advocates, who condemned the letter as antisemitic, while the university asserted that it had no part in its publication and condemned it. An external investigation, led by former Chief Justice of Nova Scotia J. Michael MacDonald, later cleared the students of any wrongdoing, declaring the letter to be protected under the school's Statement on Freedom of Speech, thus barring the students from disciplinary action.

== Location ==
The school is located inside of Podium, a building located at 350 Victoria Street which connects the Library Building and Jorgenson Hall. On February 15, 2024, it was announced that the school would move to a new location at 277 Victoria Street near Sankofa Square, a 115,000 square foot building previously owned by the City of Toronto.
