= Michael Friscolanti =

Canadian journalist

Michael Friscolanti is a senior writer with Maclean's magazine, and the author of the book Friendly Fire: The Untold Story of the U.S. Bombing that Killed Four Canadian Soldiers in Afghanistan. Previously he was a reporter for the National Post.

Friscolanti is a graduate of Lakehead University and the Ryerson University School of Journalism's graduate program. He grew up in Hamilton, Ontario and attended high school at Bishop Ryan Catholic High School, where he was valedictorian of his graduating class in 1994. He was an editor at Ryerson's student newspaper The Eyeopener, where he won a Canadian Association of Journalists award for student journalism.
