= Howard Hillen Kerr =

1st Principal of the Ryerson Polytechnical Institute
- In office September 1, 1948 – May 31, 1966 (Note: Ryerson Institute of Technology changed its name to the Ryerson Polytechnical Institute in 1964)
- Preceded by: Office created
- Succeeded by: Fred Jorgenson (as Principal of the Ryerson Polytechnical Institute)

Personal details
- Born: December 25, 1900 Seaforth, Ontario
- Died: June 16, 1984 (aged 83)
- Education: University of Toronto
- Occupation: School administrator

Howard Hillen Kerr (December 25, 1900 - June 16, 1984) was the first principal of the Ryerson Institute of Technology (now Toronto Metropolitan University).

Kerr was born on a farm near Seaforth, Ontario. He graduated from the University of Toronto in 1926 with degrees in education and engineering and became an administrator in the public school system. During World War II he was in charge of training personnel for overseas duty.

Following the war, Kerr was appointed Director of the Training and Re-Establishment Institute which was located in Toronto at the site of Egerton Ryerson's Normal School (a nineteenth-century training facility for teachers). The purpose of TRIT was to provide 32,000 veterans with vocational training to allow them to establish themselves in civilian trades and careers. Prior to TRIT's scheduled closure, Kerr convinced the Ontario government to transform it into a permanent post-secondary institution focused on practical education, apprenticeships, vocations and career training. The Ryerson Institute of Technology was established in 1948 on the former TRIT campus with Kerr as its principal until 1966 when he became Chair of the Council of Regents for Colleges of Applied Arts and Technology. In this capacity Kerr helped establish Ontario's community college system with the creation of twenty colleges modelled after the Ryerson.
