= RTA School of Media =

School at Toronto Metropolitan University

- Former names: School of Radio and Television Arts
- Parent institution: The Creative School, Toronto Metropolitan University
- Location: Toronto, Ontario, Canada
- Website: torontomu.ca/rta

The RTA School of Media is a school within the Creative School at Toronto Metropolitan University located in the Rogers Communications Centre, Toronto, Ontario, Canada. It offers two Bachelor of Arts (Media Production and Sport Media) and a Masters of Arts (Media Production). It was previously named "The School of Radio and Television Arts" and as such is and was commonly referred to as "RTA". It offers the only 4-year broadcasting degree programs in Canada and is reputed as one of the best media programs in the world.

As of Fall 2013, it offers a Bachelor of Fine Arts degree in New Media, which is a program that originated from and was transferred from TMU's School of Image Arts. The program ends with a fourth-year Thesis which can be either a research-based essay evaluating an aspect of media or a piece/series of pieces capable of being installed at a professional gallery or institution. As of January 2024 New Media is no longer a part of RTA and has been spun into its own school.

As of Fall 2014, it also began to offer a Bachelor of Arts degree in Sport Media.

Amongst all three programs, RTA accepts approximately 300+ students in any given year and its ratio of applicants to registrants is approximately 7:1.

Students gain knowledge of the many aspects of the production of media, including technical, business and creative.

In the Media Production program, after one's first year of study, students can choose which stream of production they wish to take. Students can choose between television and video, radio and sound, digital media, screenwriting, media business, and critical media theory. Everything then culminates in a final project called a Thesis production (formerly Practicum) during the students' fourth year of study. Thesis has students establish production groups, in which they create highly advanced projects through all stages of development, ranging from the initial pitch to post-production.

Many of North America's top names in the world of media are alumni of the school, as evidenced by the school's RTA Wall of Fame, including Valerie Pringle, Dave Devall, Terry O'Reilly, and Arthur Smith.
