= Eugene Chan (professor) =

Chinese linguist

Eugene S. L. Chan
- 陳西林
- Born: Chen Xilin (陳西林); Jinjing (金井鎮), Jinjiang, Fujian
- Other name: Chan Sai Lam
- Occupation: Linguist

Academic work
- Discipline: Linguistics
- Institutions: Max Planck Institute for the Science of Human History
- Main interests: Numeral systems
- Website: https://lingweb.eva.mpg.de/channumerals/

Eugene Chan (or Eugene S.-L. Chan; Chinese: 陳西林; pinyin: Chén Xīlín) is a linguist from Hong Kong who specializes in numeral systems of world languages. He is best known as the creator and curator of the Numeral Systems of the World's Languages database, which contains lists of numerals for over 5,000 of the world's languages. The database is currently the largest online collection of numerals in the world's languages.

Chan is affiliated with the Max Planck Institute for the Science of Human History.

== Early life ==
He received his undergraduate degree from the University of Michigan, master's degree from the University of Chicago, and doctoral degree from the University of Toronto.

== Research ==
Chan has published research on how food packaging can be useful against obesity, and how merely exposure to concepts related to coffee can create a "coffee buzz" even without actual coffee consumption. He has also published research in how sexual identity influences financial risk-taking, and about how moral beliefs predict stance towards wearing face masks during the COVID-19 pandemic. For his work, he received the 2018 ANZMAC Emerging Researcher Award.

== Articles ==
- Chan, E. Y., & Ilicic, J. (2019). "Political ideology and brand attachment". International Journal of Research in Marketing, 36(4), 630-646.
- Chan, E. Y., & Faria, A. A. (2022). "Political ideology and climate change-mitigating behaviors: Insights from fixed world beliefs". Global Environmental Change, 72, 102440.
- Chan, E. Y., & Palmeira, M. (2021). "Political ideology moderates consumer response to brand crisis apologies for data breaches". Computers in human behavior, 121, 106801.
- Chan, E. Y. (2021). "Moral foundations underlying behavioral compliance during the COVID-19 pandemic". Personality and individual differences, 171, 110463.

== Awards ==
Chan was awarded the 2018 ANZMAC Emerging Marketing Researcher Award by the Australia and New Zealand Marketing Academy.
