= Your World Tonight =

CBC Radio One news program

Your World Tonight, formerly known as The World at Six, is the Canadian Broadcasting Corporation's flagship dinner-hour radio news program, airing Monday to Friday from 6 to 6:28 p.m. local time on CBC Radio One except in Newfoundland where it begins at 6:30. The program was launched on October 31, 1966.

On Saturdays and Sundays, the show aired with the title The World This Weekend. In the Maritime provinces, The World This Weekend airs at 7 p.m. rather than 6, as the final hour of the live Cross Country Checkup occupies the 6 to 7 p.m. time slot. In Newfoundland, the program begins at 7:30 p.m. In the rest of Canada, however, The World This Weekend aired at 6 p.m. local time.

Formerly simulcast on both CBC Radio One and CBC Radio 2, the program airs only on Radio One as of March 2007. It is produced by CBC Radio's National News department.

As of January 29, 2024, the show, both weekday and weekend versions, were retitled Your World Tonight to integrate its podcast release without the original titles dating the content unnecessarily.

== History ==
The World at Six was the brainchild of its first senior editor, Angus McLellan. Its first anchors were CBC announcers, Bruce Rogers and John O'Leary. Initially the program began with satellite beeps and then presented a series of reports from correspondents across Canada and around the world. On statutory holidays, the program devoted about 10 minutes to current events, and then devoted the remaining time to prepared radio documentary pieces on a particular theme.

Prior to 1994, the program aired only on weekdays, with the weekend edition premiering that year.

On October 31, 2016, the program celebrated its 50th anniversary.

== Anchors, reporters and editors ==
The program's weekday anchor was Susan Bonner from September 2, 2014 to March 26, 2026. Stephanie Skenderis anchors Fridays and weekends.

Other past anchors, reporters and editors associated with the program include Alison Smith, Joan Donaldson, Joan Gottselig, Eric Moncur, Jack Kusch, Laszlo Bastyovanszky, Dave Jensen, Phil Calder, Don Northup, Tom Harrington, Bill Hawes, Bruce Wark, Susan Helwig, Keeble MacFarlane, Maureen Brosnahan, James Murray, Lorna Jackson, Barbara Smith, Russ Germain, Alannah Campbell, Bob Oxley, Bernie McNamee, Martina Fitzgerald, Dave Seglins, Dan Phelan, Mike Oldham, Michael Finlay, Jack Nagler, Ilse Hirschegge.
