= DMZ (Toronto Metropolitan University) =

Business incubator at Toronto Metropolitan University

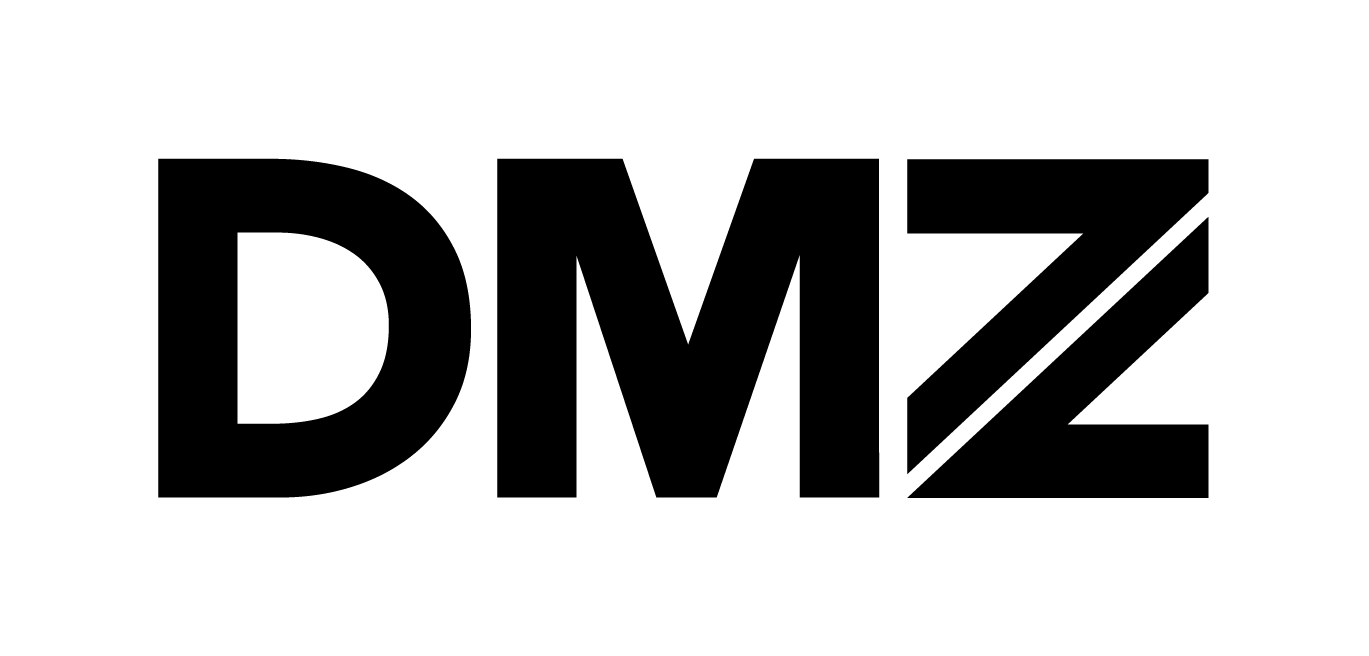
- Type: Business incubator
- Founded: April 2010
- Headquarters: Toronto, Ontario, Canada
- Website: dmz.torontomu.ca

DMZ is Toronto Metropolitan University's business incubator for early-stage technology startups.

The incubator was launched under the name Digital Media Zone in April 2010, a year after then-president Sheldon Levy announced his intention to make digital media a top priority for the university in a speech to the Empire Club of Canada. Located atop Yonge-Dundas Square (now Sankofa Square) in downtown Toronto, the incubator was established as a multidisciplinary co-working space intended to give students, alumni, and other young entrepreneurs access to mentorship, business services, and a collaborative environment for developing early-stage companies, and became home to both startups and industry solution-providers. In February 2011, DMZ expanded into a new workspace within its downtown hub. In April 2015, on the incubator's fifth anniversary, it was rebranded from "Digital Media Zone" to "DMZ".

Levy stepped down as Ryerson's president later that year to become Ontario's deputy minister of training, colleges and universities, effective December 1, 2015.

DMZ has been ranked among the world's top university-based incubators by UBI Global since 2014, and in 2018 became the first Canadian university-based incubator to be ranked number one in its category. In 2023, DMZ transitioned from being ranked by UBI Global to serving as its research and selection partner in determining the annual rankings.

In 2015, DMZ was ranked the best university-based business incubator in North America by UBI Global and in 2018 UBI Global gave it the number one ranking in the world, jointly with The SETsquared Partnership in the United Kingdom. Since it began, DMZ has helped 300 startups that have raised nearly $400 million and created in excess of 3,000 jobs.

In January 2021, the 11 year old DMZ announced that it was preparing to launch an 18-month incubator programme for startups. DMZ will take up to 2.5 percent equity in exchange for in-kind services rather than charge for a membership and assess fees. The accelerator programme, designed to scale up startups, has been eliminated; the last cohort finished in December. Sandbox, Women Founders Fast Track, and Black Innovation programmes continue to be offered. The new incubator will focus on pre-revenue companies working to build a viable product. Some companies from the accelerator programme have been asked to apply to the new one. The new programme is expected to launch on March 1, 2021, and DMZ executive director Abdullah Snobar said their plan is to support 40-50 companies by the end of 2021.
