= Jamaican Canadians =

Canadians of Jamaican birth or descent

Jamaican Canadians Jamaico-Canadians
Total population
- 309,485; 0.9% of Canada's population (2016)

Regions with significant populations
- Greater Toronto Area, Southern Ontario, Quebec, Manitoba, Alberta, Vancouver

Languages
- Canadian English, Jamaican Patois, Jamaican English, Canadian French

Religion
- Christianity · Rastafari

Related ethnic groups
- Jamaicans, Taíno, Jamaican British, British Indo-Caribbean people, Indo-Caribbeans, Multi-Racial British Caribbean, Jamaican Americans, Afro-Jamaicans, Chinese Jamaicans, Indo-Jamaicans, Germans in Jamaica, Jamaican Australians, Black Canadians, Indo-Canadians, Chinese Canadians, Arab Canadians, Indigenous peoples in Canada

Jamaican-Canadians are Canadian citizens of Jamaican descent or Jamaican-born permanent residents of Canada. Their population according to Canada's 2021 Census was 249,070. Jamaican Canadians comprise about 30% of the entire Black Canadian population.

== History ==
Most Jamaicans who arrive in Canada settle in the census metropolitan areas of Toronto, Montreal, Ottawa and Hamilton. The total number of Jamaicans in Canada has increased since the 1960s. Today, Jamaicans can be found in every major Canadian city and occupy a multitude of occupations.

=== After World War II ===
After World War II, a great demand for unskilled workers resulted in the National Act of 1948. This Act was designed to attract cheap laborers from British colonies. This resulted in many West Indians, (including Jamaicans) coming to Canada. Wanting to stop the in-flow of black West Indians, the Walter Act of 1952 was passed to impose a "severely restricted quota" on black West Indians entering the country (James & Walker, 1984).

In 1955, Canada introduced the West Indian Domestic Scheme (Anderson, 1993). This Scheme allowed eligible black women who were between the age of 18 to 35, in good health, no family ties and a minimum of a grade eight education from mainly Jamaica and Barbados to enter Canada (James & Walker, 1984). After one year as a domestic servant, these women were given a landed immigrant status and were able to apply for citizenship after five years. Even though the Scheme originally allowed only 100 women per year, 2,690 women entered Canada from Jamaica and Barbados by 1965. In 1962, racial discrimination was taken out of the Canadian Immigration Act and the number of Jamaicans who moved to Canada increased (Lazar & Dauglas, 1992).

=== After the 1960s ===
Because changes in the Immigration Act allowed non-whites to enter Canada without restrictions, many Jamaicans took advantage of the opportunity and entered Canada. After the purging of many racist immigration policies, many Jamaicans started to enter Canada as tourists and many would later apply independently for landed immigrant status (Anderson, 1993). In the late 1960s, the Canadian government instituted the Family Reunification clause into its immigration policy, which made it easier for Jamaicans and other immigrants to bring their families to join them in Canada. (Anderson, 1993). Thus, during the 1970s and '80s, many Jamaicans who entered Canada were children and husbands of the Jamaican women who moved to Canada between 1955 and 1965. According to Anderson (1993), Caribbean immigrants to Canada were more likely to settle in large cities and their provinces of choice were Ontario and Quebec. The largest concentration of Jamaican immigrants can be found in the following areas of Greater Toronto: Scarborough, Old Toronto, North York, York, Ajax, Pickering, Mississauga and Brampton. Other cities include Montreal, Ottawa, Edmonton, Vancouver, Winnipeg, Kitchener, Waterloo, Windsor and Halifax (The Canadian Encyclopedia, 2000).

In 1989, 86.7% of Jamaican immigrants settled in Ontario, 7.4% settled in Quebec, 2.6% settled in Alberta, 1.7% settled in Manitoba, 1.1% settled in British Columbia and 0.6% settled in the rest of Canada. Jamaicans made up 27.5% of the total number of West Indian immigrants for that year (Anderson, 1993).

== Demography ==
Population history
Year	Pop.	±%
1996	188,770	—
2001	211,725	+12.2%
2006	231,110	+9.2%
2011	256,915	+11.2%
2016	309,485	+20.5%

The majority of West Indians immigrating to Canada are Jamaican. Between 1974 and 1989, 35.7% of all West Indian immigration to Canada came from Jamaica. Nevertheless, there was a decline during the early '80s, a recovery during 1986 and a decline again by 1989 (Anderson, 1993). According to the Canadian Encyclopedia, Jamaicans made up 40% of West Indian immigration in the early 1990s.

In a 1996 overview from Immigration Canada, Jamaica was ranked eighth in terms of the number of its citizens immigrating to Canada. Jamaica is preceded by countries such as China, Pakistan and the Philippines in the number of its citizens that migrate to Canada. The number of Jamaicans immigrating to Canada declined in 1997 and again in 1998. Jamaican immigration to Canada is at an all-time low; it was ranked number 10 by Immigration Canada in 2000.

In 2006, 79,850 Jamaican Canadians lived in the City of Toronto, and 30,705 lived in the Toronto suburb of Brampton.

According to the Ministère des Affaires Internationales, de L'Immigration et des Communautés Culturelles et la Ville de Montréal, in 1995 there were 7,345 Jamaicans living in Quebec. By 2011, the Jamaican population nearly doubled to 12,730. Between 1960 and 1970, 28% of immigrants in Quebec were Jamaicans, during 1971 to 1980 there was a sharp increase to 41%, there was a significant drop to 12% between 1981 and 1985 and between 1986 and 1991 the number went up to 20%.

One possible reason for this drop between 1982 and 1985 might have been the language law Bill 101. Bill 101, which was introduced by Quebec's separatist government on August 26, 1977, introduced tighter restrictions on the use of English and access to English schools. It became against the law to produce any commercial sign that was not exclusively in French and the law aimed to make French the language of the workplace (O’Malley & Bowman, 2001).

Of the total number of Jamaicans living in Quebec, 20% can speak French and 86% practice Christianity as their religion. One percent of the populations have no schooling, 13% have a primary education, 45% have high school education, 25% have a college education and 16% have a university education (Ministère des Affaires Internationales, de L’Immigration et des Communautés Culturelles et la Ville de Montréal, 1995).

=== Population ===
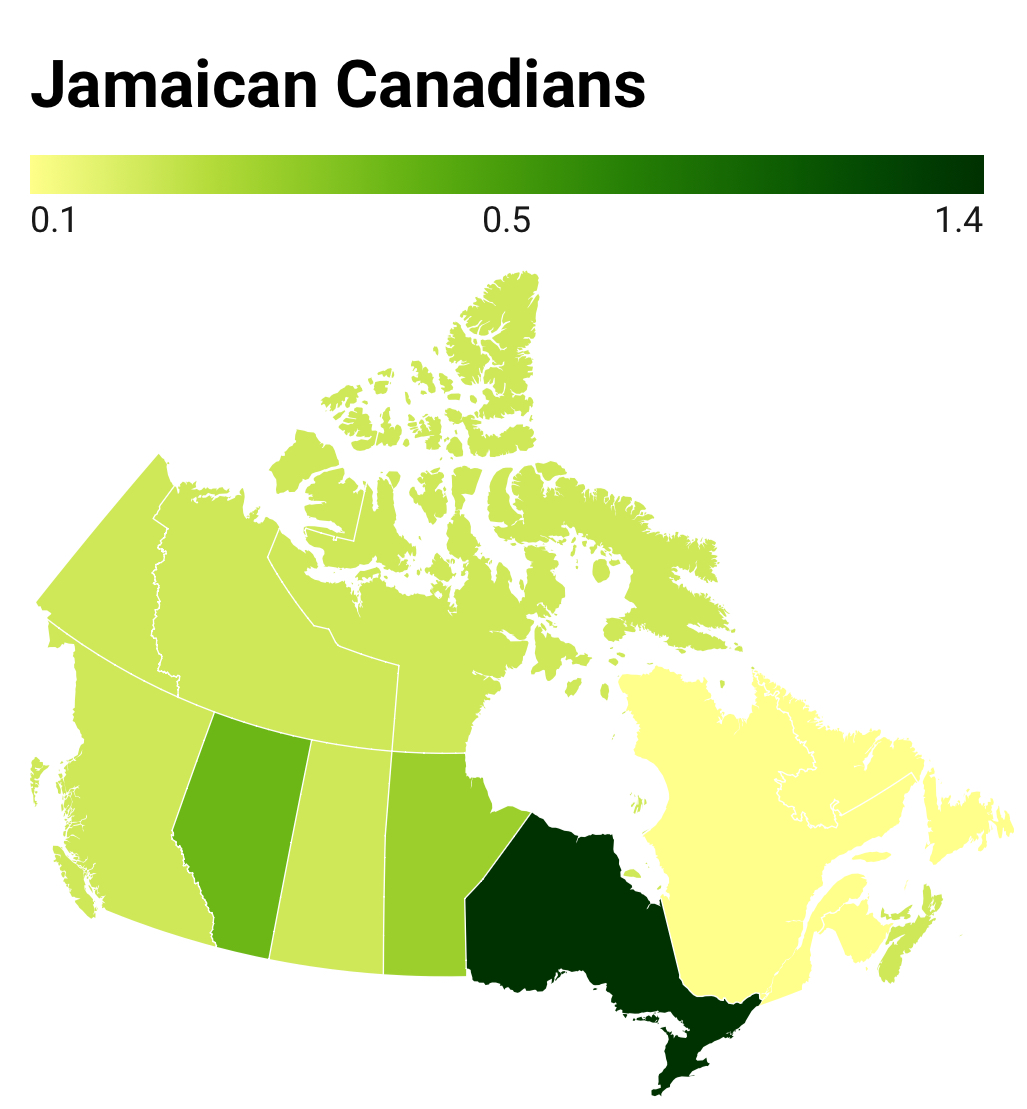
Jamaican percent in Canadian provinces/territories, 2021 census

According to the 2006 Census, 231,110 Canadians identified themselves as Jamaican Canadian. In the 2011 Census, 256,915 Jamaican Canadians were counted, comprising an 11.2% increase since the previous census. A total population of 309,485 was tallied in the 2016 Census, an increase of 20.5%.

=== Jamaican Canadians by Canadian province or territory (2016) ===
Province	Population	Percentage	Source
Ontario	257,055	1.9%	
Alberta	17,325	0.4%	
Quebec	14,100	0.2%	
British Columbia	10,545	0.2%	
Manitoba	4,585	0.4%	
Saskatchewan	2,250	0.2%	
Nova Scotia	2,075	0.2%	
New Brunswick	750	0.1%	
Newfoundland and Labrador	395	0.1%	
Prince Edward Island	155	0.1%	
Northwest Territories	120	0.3%	
Nunavut	35	0.1%	
Yukon	90	0.3%	
Canada	309,485	0.9%	

== Material culture ==
Food: includes ackee and saltfish, rice and peas, jerk chicken, fish and pork, curried goat, pepperpot soup, roasted yams, banana fritters, patties, salads, fruits and exotic desserts. Beverages include carrot juice, ginger beer, almost all kinds of fruit juices, coconut water and sorrel.

Arts and crafts: Creations in straw, clay, fabric, shell, wood and semi-precious stone are on display in most Jamaican homes. African, Indian, European and Arawak cultures influence Jamaicans Arts and Crafts. Depicting life and landscape, Jamaican paintings feature bright colours and bold lines. No Jamaican kitchen is complete without a dutchy (a cast iron pot). Dutchys come in different sizes and it is said that, "the blacker the dutchy, the sweeter it cooks".

Theater: From the 19th-century Ward Theater to innovative little theaters and thriving centers for drama in Kingston, Jamaicans like a broad range of theatrical treats. Plays depict a variety of Jamaican experiences.

Sports and games: One could argue that the national game is domino followed by ludy. Sports of choice include cricket, football (soccer), bicycle racing, water-sports, horse racing, rafting, and track and field. Among youth however, basketball and hockey are the most popular sports; Jamaican Canadians Tristan Thompson and Anthony Bennett play in the NBA and represent Canada internationally in FIBA, while PK Subban is playing for the Nashville Predator and was selected to Canada's Winter Olympic Team.

== Notable Jamaican Canadians ==
=== Academics and Scientists ===
- Nadine Burke Harris, pediatrician, Surgeon General of California
- Kamari Maxine Clarke, legal anthropologist
- Bertram Fraser-Reid, chemist
- Richard Iton, professor of African-American studies
- Lloyd Richards, former Dean of the Yale School of Drama

=== Activists ===
- Bromley Armstrong, civil rights leader and trade unionist
- Kamala-Jean Gopie, teacher and community activist
- Stanley G. Grizzle, civil rights leader and trade unionist
- Sandy Hudson, co-founder, Black Legal Action Centre
- Dudley Laws, executive director and co-founder of the Black Action Defence Committee

=== Athletes and sportspeople ===
- Kayla Alexander, basketball player
- Kyle Alexander, basketball player
- Donovan Bailey, Olympic champion sprinter
- Theo Bair, soccer player
- Rowan Barrett, retired basketball player, general manager of the Canada men's national basketball team
- RJ Barrett, NBA basketball player
- Anthony Bennett, basketball player, first Canadian to be taken first overall in the NBA draft
- Trevor Berbick, boxer; WBC heavyweight champion
- Mark Boswell, Olympic high jumper
- Oshae Brissett, Israeli Basketball Premier League basketball player
- Aaron Brown, Olympic champion sprinter
- Clifton Brown, kickboxer
- Lascelles Brown, Olympic medalist bobsledder
- Shelley-Ann Brown, Olympic medalist bobsledder
- Kadeisha Buchanan, soccer player
- Tajon Buchanan, soccer player
- Quinton Byfield, NHL ice hockey player
- Herb Carnegie, ice hockey player
- Brandon Clarke, NBA basketball player
- Austin Codrington, cricketer
- Charmaine Crooks, Olympic medalist track and field athlete
- Trevor Daley, ice hockey player
- Nigel Dawes, NHL ice hockey player
- Hakeem Dawodu, mixed martial artist
- Clifton Dawson, football player
- Julián de Guzmán, soccer player
- Franklyn Dennis, cricketer
- Jason Doig, NHL ice hockey player
- Raheem Edwards, soccer player
- Dylan Ennis, basketball player
- Tyler Ennis, Israeli Basketball Premier League basketball player
- Robert Esmie, Olympic sprinter
- Orlando Franklin, NFL football player
- Hugh Fraser, Olympic sprinter, Ontario Court of Justice judge
- Mark Fraser, NHL ice hockey player
- Robyn Gayle, soccer player
- Tyrell Goulbourne, NHL ice hockey player
- Mark Anthony Graham, Olympic track and field athlete and soldier
- Karlene Haughton, Olympic track and field athlete
- Doneil Henry, soccer player
- Curtis Hibbert, Olympic gymnast
- Junior Hoilett, soccer player
- Joshua Ho-Sang, ice hockey player
- Simeon Jackson, soccer player
- Daniel Jebbison, soccer player
- Paul Jerrard, ice hockey player and coach
- Ben Johnson, Olympic medalist and world champion sprinter
- Chris Johnson, Olympic medalist boxer
- Mark-Anthony Kaye, soccer player
- Molly Killingbeck, Olympic track and field athlete
- Cyle Larin, soccer player
- Orville Lee, football player
- Jamall Lee, football player
- Lennox Lewis, World champion heavyweight boxer
- Vaughn Martin, football player
- Atlee Mahorn, sprinter
- Simon Marcus, kickboxer
- Jahkeele Marshall-Rutty, soccer player
- Bryanna McCarthy, soccer player
- Michael McDonald, kickboxer
- Kamal Miller, soccer player
- Ashtone Morgan, soccer player
- Jamal Murray, NBA basketball player
- Andrew Nicholson, basketball player
- Josh Palmer, NFL football player
- Claude Patrick, mixed martial artist
- Shakeel Phinn, boxer
- Dwight Powell, NBA basketball player
- Nichelle Prince, soccer player
- Tosaint Ricketts, soccer player
- Deanne Rose, soccer player
- Donovan Ruddock, boxer
- Calvin Stewart, footballer
- Reggie Savage, ice hockey player
- Desiree Scott, soccer player
- Tony Sharpe, Olympic medalist sprinter
- Courtney Smith, rugby player
- Anthony Stewart, NHL ice hockey player
- Chris Stewart, NHL ice hockey player
- Malcolm Subban, ice hockey player
- P. K. Subban, NHL ice hockey player
- Graeme Townshend, NHL ice hockey player
- Angella Taylor-Issajenko, Olympic medalist sprinter
- Ryan Thelwell, NFL football player
- Tristan Thompson, basketball player
- Carl Valentine, retired soccer player and current coach
- Charity Williams, rugby sevens player

=== Businesspeople ===
- Wes Hall, businessman and Dragons' Den investor
- Michael Lee-Chin, businessman and philanthropist
- G. Raymond Chang, businessman and philanthropist
- Denham Jolly, businessman, philanthropist, publisher, broadcaster
- Millicent Redway, publisher and founder of the Black Pages Network

=== Fashion Industry ===
- Winnie Harlow, fashion model
- Stacey McKenzie, fashion model and television host

=== Journalists ===
- Dwight Drummond, news anchor
- Fitzroy Gordon, broadcaster, sports journalist
- Mark Jones, sportscaster
- Paul Jones, sportscaster
- Tracy Moore, broadcast journalist
- Tashauna Reid, broadcast journalist
- Nerene Virgin, broadcast journalist, actress and television host
- Marcia Young, broadcast journalist

=== Media, Film, and Television ===
- Philip Akin, actor and voice actor, X-Men: The Animated Series
- Shamier Anderson, actor, Wynonna Earp
- Trey Anthony, playwright, actor, and producer
- King Bach, Internet personality and comedian
- Jeffrey Bowyer-Chapman, actor and television personality
- Aisha Brown, comedian and actress
- Christina Cox, actress
- Roger Cross, actor, 24
- Ayesha Curry, cookbook author and cooking television personality
- Tyrone Edwards, television host and entrepreneur
- Shailene Garnett, actress, Diggstown, Murdoch Mysteries
- Kevin Hanchard, actor, Orphan Black, The Expanse
- Darryl Hinds, actor and comedian, Royal Canadian Air Farce
- Adrian Holmes, actor 19-2
- Jennifer Holness, film director and producer
- Stephan James, actor, Homecoming, Race
- Kristin Kreuk, actress, Smallville, Burden of Truth
- Hayley Law, actress, Riverdale
- Colin Lawrence, actor, Battlestar Galactica, Virgin River
- Andrea Lewis, actress, Degrassi: The Next Generation
- Nicole Lyn, actress, Student Bodies
- Yanna McIntosh, actress
- Annmarie Morais, screenwriter
- Ron Nelson, radio DJ, Canadian hip-hop pioneer
- Charles Officer, director, writer, and actor
- Britne Oldford, actress, Skins, Ravenswood
- Rob Rainford, chef and television host
- Gloria Reuben, actress, ER
- Karen Robinson, actress, Schitt's Creek, Pretty Hard Cases
- Michelle Ross, drag performer
- Denis Simpson, television host and singer
- Dainty Smith, actor
- Ordena Stephens-Thompson, actress
- Master T, television host
- Sharine Taylor, writer and filmmaker
- Gail Vaz-Oxlade, financial writer and television personality
- Clement Virgo, director
- Leighton Alexander Williams, actor and playwright
- Peter Williams, actor, Stargate SG-1
- Tonya Lee Williams, actress The Young and the Restless
- Maurice Dean Wint, actor, The Kid Detective

=== Musicians ===
- Lillian Allen, dub reggae musician and poet
- Darren Barrett, jazz musician
- Jully Black, R&B singer
- Boi-1da, hip-hop producer
- Cindy Breakspeare, jazz singer and beauty queen
- Divine Brown, R&B singer
- Miquel Brown, disco and soul singer
- Daniel Caesar, R&B singer
- Choclair, rapper
- Dan-e-o, rapper
- Smoke Dawg, rapper
- Fefe Dobson, singer-songwriter
- Jay Douglas, reggae musician
- Gerald Eaton, singer-songwriter
- Jonathan Emile, R&B singer
- Lovena Fox, pop singer
- Raz Fresco, rapper and producer
- Saskia Garel, singer-songwriter
- Othalie Graham, opera singer
- Carl Harvey, guitarist
- Carl Henry, R&B singer
- K-Anthony, gospel singer
- Londa Larmond, gospel singer
- Glenn Lewis, R&B singer
- Exco Levi, reggae musician
- Margeaux, singer-songwriter
- Michie Mee, rapper
- Tre Mission, rapper and producer
- Jackie Mittoo, reggae keyboardist and producer
- Nineteen85, hip-hop producer
- Kardinal Offishall, rapper and record label executive
- PartyNextDoor, singer and rapper
- The Mighty Pope, R&B and ska singer
- Pressa, rapper
- Louie Rankin, dancehall reggae artist and actor
- Leroy Sibbles, reggae musician and producer
- Lord Tanamo, ska and mento musician
- Tasha the Amazon, rapper
- Sevn Thomas, hip-hop and reggae producer
- T-Minus, hip-hop producer
- Kreesha Turner, R&B singer

=== Politicians and Government Officials ===
- Lincoln Alexander, former MP for Hamilton West, first Black member of the House of Commons of Canada
- Hewitt Bernard, lawyer, militia member and civil servant
- Margarett Best, MPP for Scarborough—Guildwood
- Leonard Braithwaite, former MPP for Etobicoke, first Black person elected to a provincial legislature
- Rosemary Brown, former MLA for Vancouver-Burrard and Burnaby-Edmonds, first Black woman elected to a provincial legislature
- Mary Anne Chambers, former MPP for Scarborough East
- Alvin Curling, former MPP for Scarborough—Rouge River and diplomat
- Mitzie Hunter, MPP for Scarborough—Guildwood
- Leslyn Lewis, MP for Haldimand—Norfolk
- Laura Mae Lindo, MPP for Kitchener Centre
- Terence MacDermot, diplomat and academic
- Beverley Salmon, North York city councilor and Metropolitan Toronto councilor
- Mark Saunders, chief, Toronto Police Service
- Peter Sloly, chief, Ottawa Police Service
- Chris Spence, former director of education for the Toronto District School Board

=== Writers and Authors ===
- Afua Cooper, poet and historian
- Orville Lloyd Douglas, essayist, poet, and writer
- Honor Ford-Smith, poet and playwright
- Malcolm Gladwell, writer (The Tipping Point), lecturer and theorist
- Nalo Hopkinson, science fiction writer, Brown Girl in the Ring
- Rachel Manley, writer and novelist
- Pamela Mordecai, writer and novelist
- Zalika Reid-Benta, writer
- Makeda Silvera, writer and novelist
- Olive Senior, poet and novelist
- Karl Subban, writer and educator
- d'bi Young, poet and playwright

== See also ==
- British Jamaica
- Indian Canadians
- Lebanese Canadians
- Chinese Canadians
- Irish Canadians
- Caribbean Canadians
- Canada–Jamaica relations
