= Missing and Murdered =

Missing and Murdered may refer to:

- Missing and Murdered Indigenous Women, a human rights crisis of violence against Indigenous women in Canada and the United States
- Missing and Murdered (podcast), a true crime podcast on the above subject
