= Donaldson Scholarship =

Scholarship in Canada

The Joan Donaldson Newsworld Scholarship is awarded annually by CBC News Network to aspiring journalists in honour of Newsworld's former head, Joan Donaldson. As many as eight recipients are chosen from journalism programs from across Canada. It is considered one of the highest awards in Canadian student journalism. Many recipients continue to work for CBC Newsworld as reporters or behind the scenes.

There has been controversy that the selection process places too much emphasis on gender and racial diversity, which is a common criticism of CBC in general. This was brought to a head in 2005 when senior management voiced their concerns internally over that year's group, calling it a "failure" and saying that it was not adequately representative of Canadian society. That year seven out of the eight recipients were female and no visible minorities were represented. This resulted in a greater attention to diversity in the 2006 selection, with that year's group being thought of as ideally balanced.

== Notable Donaldson Scholars ==
=== 2009 ===
- Tashauna Reid (Ryerson University)

=== 2008 ===
- Jeff Semple

=== 2000 ===
- Connie Walker (Saskatchewan Indian Federated College), former host of Street Cents on CBC
