= Darryl Kyte =

Darryl Kyte is a lawyer, writer, producer and television personality in Canada. Kyte hosted the Canadian Broadcasting Corporation's International Emmy and Gemini award winning show Street Cents and has worked as a journalist and producer for a number of other CBC news television programs.

== Early life and education ==
Born in Toronto, Ontario, Kyte attended Leaside High School. Kyte holds honours journalism and economics degrees from the University of King's College and Dalhousie University and a law degree from the Schulich School of Law at Dalhousie University.

== Career ==
Kyte began working with Street Cents in 2000 appearing as 'Darryl the intern' on multiple episodes. In 2001 Kyte became a host of the show, a position he held for four seasons. Kyte’s co-host Kim D'Eon (2000–2003) appeared on Entertainment Tonight Canada. Kyte’s other co-hosts Alison Dixon (2003–2005) is currently a medical doctor and Connie Walker (2001–2004) continues to work with the CBC.

Kyte has worked around the world as a writer, reporter and producer for CBC’s the National, various regional newscasts and CBC Sports. Kyte has also taken part in a number of independent television programs including That News Show on TVtropolis and international health and medical media Freddie Award winning video P.A.R.T.Y.

Kyte articled and practiced at one of North America’s top music law firms.
