= Stolen (podcast) =

Investigative journalism podcast

Stolen is an investigative journalism podcast hosted by Connie Walker and produced by Gimlet Media.

The podcast is hosted by journalist Connie Walker, who previously hosted Missing and Murdered. In 2019, Connie Walker left CBC to work at Gimlet Media.

== Programming and subjects ==
=== The Search for Jermain ===
The Search for Jermain is an eight-episode season. There is a bonus episode containing updates related to the case in addition to the standard eight episodes. The podcast debuted on March 1, 2021. While Walker's previous reporting focused on missing persons cases in Canada The Search for Jermain focused on a case in the United States. The podcast investigates the missing persons case of Jermain Charlo, a 23-year-old woman who has been missing since 2018, a missing persons case which received very little media attention before 2025. Walker heard about the case from Lauren Small Rodriguez who works with human trafficking survivors in Missoula. In the first episode of the season, Walker interviews Vicki Velarde, Charlo's grandmother. In the second episode, Walker discusses the sex trafficking of indigenous women. Walker explores the history of the area and discusses how settlers forced Charlo's ancestors out of the Bitterroot Valley and into the Flathead Indian Reservation.

=== Surviving St. Michael's ===
The series is exclusively on Spotify. Walker's father was in the Royal Canadian Mounted Police and during his time as an officer he had pulled over a priest that had abused him as a child. When he recognized who it was he beat up the priest. Walker learned about this story from a social media post that her brother made shortly after unmarked graves were found at the Kamloops Indian Residential School in 2021. After learning about the incident, Walker decided to try and find the priest. The season contains a number of interviews with Walker's relatives. The season discusses Canadian residential schools in general and the intergenerational trauma that was caused by them. However, the podcast specifically focuses on St. Michael's Indian Residential School where Walker's father was a student.

=== Third Season ===
The podcast was set for a third season. Spotify announced that it would not be renewing the show and the show would be finding a new home.

== Reception ==
=== Awards ===
Award	Date	Category	Recipient	Result	Ref.
Discover Pods Awards	2021	Best New/Debut Podcast of 2021	The Search for Jermain	Finalist	
Ambies	2022	Best Reporting	The Search for Jermain	Nominated	
Peabody Awards	2022	Podcast & Radio	Surviving St. Michael's	Won	
Alfred I. duPont Award	2023	Podcast	Surviving St. Michael's	Won	
Pulitzer Prize	2023	Audio Reporting	Surviving St. Michael's	Won	
