= Okanese 82 =

Indian reserve in Saskatchewan, Canada

Coordinates: 50°55′38″N 103°23′12″W

- Indian reserve
- Okanese Indian Reserve No. 82
- Location in Saskatchewan
- First Nation: Okanese
- Country: Canada
- Province: Saskatchewan

Area
  - Total: 6,267.4 ha (15,487 acres)

Population (2016)
  - Total: 175
  - Density: 2.79/km^{2} (7.23/sq mi)
- Community Well-Being Index: 57

Okanese 82 is an Indian reserve of the Okanese First Nation in Saskatchewan. It is about 16 kilometres (9.9 mi) north-east of Fort Qu'Appelle. In the 2016 Canadian Census, it recorded a population of 175 living in 56 of its 69 total private dwellings. In the same year, its Community Well-Being index was calculated at 57 of 100, compared to 58.4 for the average First Nations community and 77.5 for the average non-Indigenous community.

== See also ==
- List of Indian reserves in Saskatchewan
