= Love and Sas =

Canadian pop group

- Origin: Toronto, Ontario, Canada
- Genres: R&B, funk, hip hop
- Years active: 1991–1993
- Labels: BMG * RCA
- Members: Lovena Fox; Saskia Garel

Love and Sas were a Canadian R&B, funk and rap influenced pop group composed of singers Lovena Fox and Saskia Garel. The pair released several singles which became Top 40 hits on Canadian pop charts and won two Juno awards.

== History ==
Fox and Garel were brought together in 1991 by Richie Mayer and record producer David Bendeth, who at the time worked for BMG Canada. Fox, who had worked in musical theatre and as a back-up singer for Bon Jovi, The Payolas, and Colin James, became the lead singer. Garel was born in Kingston, Jamaica, and moved to Toronto at the age of six. A winner of the Oscar Peterson Award, she had jazz and classical voice training at Claude Watson School of the Arts, The Royal Conservatory of Music and York University.

The two, compared by Jam! Showbiz to American female rappers Salt-N-Pepa, released their first album Call My Name in 1991

The album spawned the singles "I Don't Need Yo' Kiss", "Call My Name", "Don't Stop Now", and "Once in a Lifetime". Sas's rap in "I Don't Need Yo' Kiss" was one of the first Canadian female rap performances.

The duo toured Canada, U.S., and the UK, but disbanded in the summer of 1993.

== Discography ==
=== Albums ===
- 1991: Call My Name (BMG)

== Filmography ==
=== Music videos ===
Year	Song titles	Artist	Notes
1992	"I Don't Need Yo Kiss"	Love and Sas	Revolver Productions
1992	"Don't Stop Now"	Love and Sas	Debra Samuel Productions
1992	"Call My Name"	Love and Sas	Revolver Productions
1992	"Not Giving You Up"	Love and Sas	Revolver Productions

== Awards and nominations ==
Year	Nominee / work	Award	Result
1992	"Call My Name"	Juno Awards Best R&B/Soul Recording	Won
1992	"I Don't Need Yo Kiss"	Juno Awards Best Dance Recording	Nominated
1992	"Don't Stop Now"	Muchmusic Awards Best Dance Video	Nominated
1993	"Once In A Lifetime"	Juno Awards Best R&B/Soul Recording	Won
