= Joan Donaldson =

Canadian journalist

- Born: Joan Marsha Donaldson; 23 April 1946; Toronto, Ontario, Canada
- Died: 7 September 2006 (aged 60); Victoria, British Columbia, Canada
- Occupation: journalist
- Years active: 1967-1990
- Spouse: Arthur Gelgoot (during 1980s)

Joan Marsha Donaldson (23 April 1946 – 7 September 2006) was a Canadian journalist, and was the founding head of CBC Newsworld (now CBC News Network). She came to Newsworld from CBC's main network.

== Biography ==
Born in Toronto, Donaldson first joined the CBC in 1967 as an editor with National Radio News. During her time with CBC Radio, she served as Senior Editor of The World at Six, Sunday Morning Magazine and various news specials. She reported from Viet Nam during the war, and later produced Michael Maclear's Vietnam: The Ten Thousand Day War, a series of documentary films on the conflict. In 1971, Donaldson went to CBC Winnipeg as the producer of the popular early evening news show 24 Hours.

Two years later, she returned to the network in Toronto as a producer on Newsmagazine and news specials.

After a five-year stint as a field producer on CTV's W5, Donaldson joined Ryerson Polytechnical Institute in 1975 as an instructor in Broadcast Journalism, in addition to teaching at the University of Western Ontario in the Journalism Program for Native People.

During the 1980s, she was married to Arthur Gelgoot (d. 2004), an accountant. The couple divorced.

Donaldson returned to the CBC in 1985 as Co-ordinator of Regional Programming, TV News and Current Affairs. She was appointed head of CBC Newsworld during its inception stages in 1987 and oversaw the launch of the new specialty service in 1989.

== Death and legacy ==
In October 1990, Donaldson was hit by a bicyclist in Montreal. As a result, she had brain damage, had quadriplegia, and was in a coma for two years. Afterwards, she was unable to continue her career.

She was 60 years old when she died from complications of her injuries, in Victoria, British Columbia, 7 September 2006.

The Donaldson Scholarship is dedicated to her invaluable contributions to Canadian journalism.
