= Lovena Fox =

Canadian singer

Lovena Fox is a singer from Vancouver, British Columbia. She was a member of the hiphop/pop duo Love and Sas.

== Early life ==
Fox was born in Vancouver, the daughter of a jazz club owner.

== Career ==
Fox was a member of the Black and Gold Review at the Arts Club Theatre, and was part of the cast of Ain't Misbehavin' in Vancouver. She participated in the show Star Search in Los Angeles.

Fox worked as a backup singer in several musical groups until in 1991 she came together with Toronto singer Saskia Garel to form the pop duo Love and Sas. The duo won two Juno awards for their albums Call My Name and Once In A Lifetime.

Fox continued to perform in musical theatre. She played the role of Sarah on the national tour of Ragtime and later released a solo album, Holdin' Out.
