= Marie-Anne Day Walker-Pelletier =

Marie-Anne Day Walker-Pelletier CM SOM (born April 15, 1954) is the Chief of the Okanese First Nation. Since becoming chief in 1981 she is the longest-serving female chief in Saskatchewan.

In July 2001, Walker-Pelletier was host of a healing conference included native leaders from across Canada. In 2005, she was Chair of the Federation of Saskatchewan Indian Nations.

She was named a Member of the Order of Canada in 2018 and a Member of the Saskatchewan Order of Merit in 2021.
