= Benita Ha =

Canadian actress

- Born: Hong Kong
- Occupations: Actress, practical nurse, TV host, reporter, news anchor, producer
- Years active: 1989-present

Benita Ha (born January 19) is a Hong Kong Canadian actress. She is best known in Canada for her appearance in the television show Street Cents.

== Life and career ==
Ha was once known for hosting the television show Street Cents, but her rapidly expanding list of credits on both the small screen and the big screen has allowed her to expand beyond the early days of her career. She studied journalism at the University of King's College in Halifax, Nova Scotia and communications at Simon Fraser University in Burnaby, British Columbia.

Ha has also appeared in Smallville, X-Men: The Last Stand, Psych, Paycheck, Catwoman, and Flight 93. She recently voiced the character Rebecca Chang in the survival horror video game Dead Rising 2 and appeared in Underworld: Awakening, R.L. Stine's The Haunting Hour, Innocent and Emily Owens M.D. and Motive.

Ha was a publicist and consultant at MJM Communications. She also was a host, producer, field and segment producer, news anchor, and reporter at the CBC, CTV News Channel, Citytv, and Discovery Channel.

Ha was born in Hong Kong and can speak Cantonese. Her surname, Ha, means summer in Cantonese.

Ha once hosted the Vancouver Asian Canadian Theatre show - Chop Suey Special #10 with Canadian comedian Tom Chin at the Norman Rothstein Theatre on January 23, 2010.

In 2011, Ha appeared in a Bank of Montreal commercial. In the commercial, she played the role of a banker. She also voiced the character Rebecca Chang again in the video game Dead Rising 2: Off the Record.

Ha was a practical nurse at George Pearson Centre and has been a practical nurse at St. Paul's Hospital since 2012. She continues to act.

== Filmography ==
Film
Year	Film	Role	Notes
1993	Cadillac Girls	Dixie	
1996	Hard Core Logo	Pipefitter's Girlfriend	
1997	Love and Death on Long Island	Weather Reporter	
1999	10,000 Delusions	sign-language teacher Mia	Short film
2000	A Feeling Called Glory	Amy's Mother Rose	Short film
2000	How to Kill Your Neighbor's Dog	Female Anchor	
2000	The 6th Day	Teacher	
2001	Antitrust	Party Reporter	
2001	Valentine	Kim Wheeler	
2001	Exiles in Paradise	Ai Ling Huang	
2001	Kevin of the North	Airline Clerk	
2002	Liebe auf den 2. Blick	Benita	English Title: Love at second sight
2002	Lily's Crickets	Lily Hong	Short film
2003	Final Destination 2	Dental Receptionist - Jean	
2003	Paycheck	Wife	
2004	Catwoman	Forensics Technician	
2005	White Noise	TV Reporter	
2005	Pennyman	Bank Teller	Short film
2006	Civic Duty	On Scene News Reporter #2	
2006	X-Men: The Last Stand	Worthington Technician	
2006	Unnatural & Accidental	Lee	uncredited
2007	The Invisible	Gillian	
2009	Case 39	Diane	
2010	Dead Rising 2: Case Zero	Rebecca Chang (voice)	Video game, uncredited
2010	Dead Rising 2	Rebecca Chang (voice)	Video game
2011	Dead Rising 2: Off the Record	Rebecca Chang (voice)	Video game
2012	Underworld: Awakening	Surgical Nurse	
2013	Dead Rising 3	Rebecca Chang (voice)	Video game
2015	No Men Beyond This Point	News Anchor	
2016	Brain on Fire	Nurse's Assistant	uncredited
2018	Fifty Shades Freed	ER Nurse	
2019	Benchwarmers 2: Breaking Balls	Mayor White	
2019	Good Boys	Lily's & Soren's Mom	

Television
Year	Film	Role	Notes
1989-1993	Street cents	Benita (Host)	unknown episode
1994	Metro Cafe	Vancouver host	unknown episode
1995	The X Files	Guide	episode "The Blessing Way"
1995	When the Vows Break	Nurse Donna	TV movie
1996	Poltergeist: The Legacy	Gao Ziyan (The fox spirit)	episode "Fox Spirit"
1996	Panic in the Skies!	Ticket Agent	TV movie
1996	Madison	Annie	3 episodes
1997	Alibi	Girl at Connor's Party	TV movie, uncredited
1997	Breaker High	Tea Sensei	episode "Sun Ahso Rises"
1997	The Christmas List	Asian Shopper	TV movie
1998	The Net	Newscaster / Xia Min	2 episodes
1999	The Outer Limits	Cute Lab Technician	episode "Descent"
2000	Up, Up, and Away	Ms. Parker	TV Movie
2000	Higher Ground	Annie Yao	7 episodes
2000	Da Vinci's Inquest	Medical Student	episode "Do You Wanna Dance"
2001	Caitlin's Way	Sensei	episode "Side Kicks"
2001	Black River	Charts' Assistant	TV movie
2001	Beyond Belief: Fact or Fiction	Michelle	episode "7 Hours Bad Luck"
2002	Mysterious Ways	Alice Takamoto	episode "Face in the Crowd"
2002	Cold Squad	Mrs. Yan #1	episode "Kill Me Twice"
2003	Out of Order	Fertility Receptionist	TV mini-series
2003	Wilder Days	Administrator	TV movie
2003	Picking Up & Dropping Off	Rosalind	TV movie
2004	Jake 2.0	Sketch Artist Tech	episode "Upgrade"
2004	The Chris Isaak Show	Saleswoman #2 / Tammy Fung	2 episodes
2004	NTSB: The Crash of Flight 323	D.C. Flight Attendant	TV movie
2004	Stargate SG-1	Brooks	2 episodes
2004	Huff	Molly	episode "Pilot"
2005	Personal Effects	Clerk	TV movie
2005	Smallville	Dr. Asuka	episode"Solitude"
2006	Flight 93	Gate Agent	TV movie
2006	Killer Instinct	Riley	3 episodes
2006	Whistler	Suzie	episode "After the Fall"
2006	Blade: The Series	Dr. Chang	2 episodes
2007	Reaper	Reporter	episode "Love, Bullets and Blacktop"
2009	Scooby-Doo! The Mystery Begins	Mom	TV movie
2010	Psych	Reporter # 2	episode"The Head, the Tail, the Whole Damn Episode"
2010	V	News Anchor / News Reporter #2 / Reporter #1	3 episodes
2010	The Troop	Mrs. Helmsley	episode"Double Felix"
2010	Sanctuary	Shirley Wilkins (The News Reporter)	episode"Trail of Blood"
2011	R.L. Stine's The Haunting Hour	P.E Teacher / Mom Chen	2 episodes
2011	Innocent	Dr. Stack	TV movie
2013	Emily Owens M.D.	Anesthesiologist	3 episodes
2013	#SaveBCFilm PSA	Herself	TV movie
2013	Single & Dating in Vancouver	Benita	1 episode, Web series for "SaveBCFilm"
2013	Motive	Nurse Evelyn	episode "Angels With Dirty Faces"
