= Tashauna Reid =

Jamaican–Canadian journalist

- Born: St. Elizabeth, Jamaica
- Education: Ryerson University (BA)
- Occupation: Journalist
- Employer: Canadian Broadcasting Corporation

Tashauna Reid (born in St. Elizabeth, Jamaica) is a Jamaican-Canadian journalist.

== Early life ==
Reid was raised in St. Catharines and Oakville, Ontario. She earned a bachelor's degree in journalism from Ryerson University in 2009. She won the 2009 Joan Donaldson Scholarship from the CBC, and joined CBC News in 2009.

Reid has contributed to CBC's The National, CBC Radio's Here and Now, and CBC Toronto. One of her highlights includes live reporting during the Tragically Hip's Man Machine Poem final tour stop in Kingston, Ontario. Reid was also involved in HERstory in Black, a digital photo series of 150 black women from the Greater Toronto Area created by Krissy Doyle-Thomas.

Reid has spoken at events and fundraisers. At the 61st Anniversary of the Canadian Council of Christians and Jews, she spoke about the importance of the Canadian Centre for Diversity. Reid has hosted many community events, including the Power of One Fundraiser (2016 and 2017) and the Woman to Woman Lunch in the Garden (2017).
