= George Brown Polytechnic =

College in Toronto, Ontario, Canada

The George Brown College of Applied Arts and Technology
- Named for: George Brown
- Type: Public college
- Established: 1967; 59 years ago
- Affiliations: CCAA, ACCC, AUCC, CBIE, Polytechnics Canada, CUP.
- Chancellor: Noella Milne
- President: Dr. Gervan Fearon
- Students: 27,128 full-time and 58,119 continuing education registrants (2025: 16,450 FTEs)
- Location: Toronto, Ontario, Canada
- Campus: Urban
- Sports teams: Huskies
- Colours: Blue and white
- Website: georgebrown.ca

The George Brown College of Applied Arts and Technology, branded as George Brown Polytechnic since 2025, is a publicly funded college of applied arts and technology with three campuses in downtown Toronto, Ontario, Canada. Like many other colleges in Ontario, George Brown College was chartered in 1966 by the government of Ontario and opened the following year.

== History ==
The college was established during the formation of Ontario's community college system in 1967. Colleges of Applied Arts and Technology were established on May 21, 1965. The college is named after George Brown, who was an important 19th-century politician and newspaper publisher (he founded the Toronto Globe, forerunner to The Globe and Mail) and was one of the Fathers of Confederation.

The college's predecessor, the Provincial Institute of Trades (PIT), was founded in 1951 to offer apprentice training on behalf of the provincial Department of Labour. In 1952, the PIT began operation at 21 Nassau Street in Toronto's Kensington Market and, after expanding with the construction of two additional buildings on the site, was offering programs in lathing and structural steel, barbering, diesel mechanics, jewellery arts, watchmaking and welding by 1961. In 1962 the province opened the Provincial Institute of Trades and Occupations (PITO), a sister training institute, at 555 Davenport Road near Casa Loma.

The final logo of George Brown College

When George Brown College was formed in 1967, it absorbed both the PIT and PITO and opened its Kensington and Casa Loma campuses at the two institutes' former facilities. George Brown College also went on to absorb, in 1969, four former Toronto Board of Education Adult Education Centres in a third campus at 507 College Street and, in 1973, five Toronto-area Schools of Nursing in 1973, including: St. Joseph's, St. Michael's, Toronto General, Atkinson (Toronto Western) and Nightingale.

In 1973, a new expanded Casa Loma campus was opened. In 1976, the St. James Campus opened at 200 King Street East in buildings formerly belonging to Christie Bakery and Hallmark Cards.

The Hospitality building (300 Adelaide E.) opened at St. James Campus in 1987, the same year that the College Street Campus closed. Kensington Campus closed in 1994. Waterfront Campus at 51 Dockside Drive opened in 2012.

On October 30, 2025, George Brown College announced it would rebrand to George Brown Polytechnic.

In 2025, the institute began implementing program intake suspensions and academic restructuring measures amid financial pressures associated with declining international student enrolment and changes to federal immigration policies. In February 2025, the college announced that several program intakes would be paused for the spring and summer semesters, alongside voluntary staff retirement and employee exit incentives.

== Programs ==
George Brown offers more than 170 full-time programs in art and design, business, community services, early childhood education, construction and engineering technologies, health sciences, hospitality and culinary arts, preparatory studies, as well as specialized programs and services for recent immigrants and international students.

The college is fully accredited and offers diploma programs, advanced diploma programs, as well as degree programs, two in conjunction with Toronto Metropolitan University. The college offers the following degrees:

Arts, Design & Information Technology

- Honours Bachelor of Brand Design
- Honours Bachelor of Digital Experience

Business

- Honours Bachelor of Commerce (Financial Services)
- Honours Bachelor of Business Administration (Business Analytics)

Community Services & Early Childhood

- Honours Bachelor of Interpretation (American Sign Language)
- Early Childhood Education (consecutive diploma/degree)
- Honours Bachelor of Early Childhood Leadership

Construction & Engineering Technologies

- Honours Bachelor of Technology (Construction Management)

Health Sciences

- Honours Bachelor of Behaviour Analysis
- Bachelor of Science in Nursing
- Honours Bachelor of Science (Dental Hygiene)

Hospitality & Culinary Arts

- Honours Bachelor of Commerce (Culinary Management)
- Honours Bachelor of Food Studies
- Honours Bachelor of Business Administration (Hospitality)

Graduate and certificate programs, pre-college and apprentice programs round out the college's full-time offerings. As of 2022, there are 180 continuing education certificates/designations available.

In 2021, there were 27,128 full-time students — 29 percent international students — as well as 3,123 part-time students and 58,119 continuing education registrants.

George Brown has 15,000 distance education students studying in over 35 countries. One of the most popular distance education programs offered by the college is its award-winning Electronics Technician distance education program, developed by Dr. Colin Simpson.

George Brown was named one of the Greater Toronto's Top Employers for 2022.

In 2022, George Brown College was ranked among the top 10 research colleges in the country, ranking 8th for overall research income, and ranking 4th for both the number of paid students and for the number of completed projects. Research Infosource, which publishes annual rankings reports on research and development at institutions across Canada, released the results for the top 50 colleges in January 2022.

== Presidents ==
- C.C. Lloyd (1968–1978)
- D.E. Light (1978–1991)
- John Rankin (1991–1995)
- Frank Sorochinsky (1994–2004)
- Anne Sado (2004–2021)
- Gervan Fearon (2021–present)

== Campuses ==
=== Casa Loma campus ===
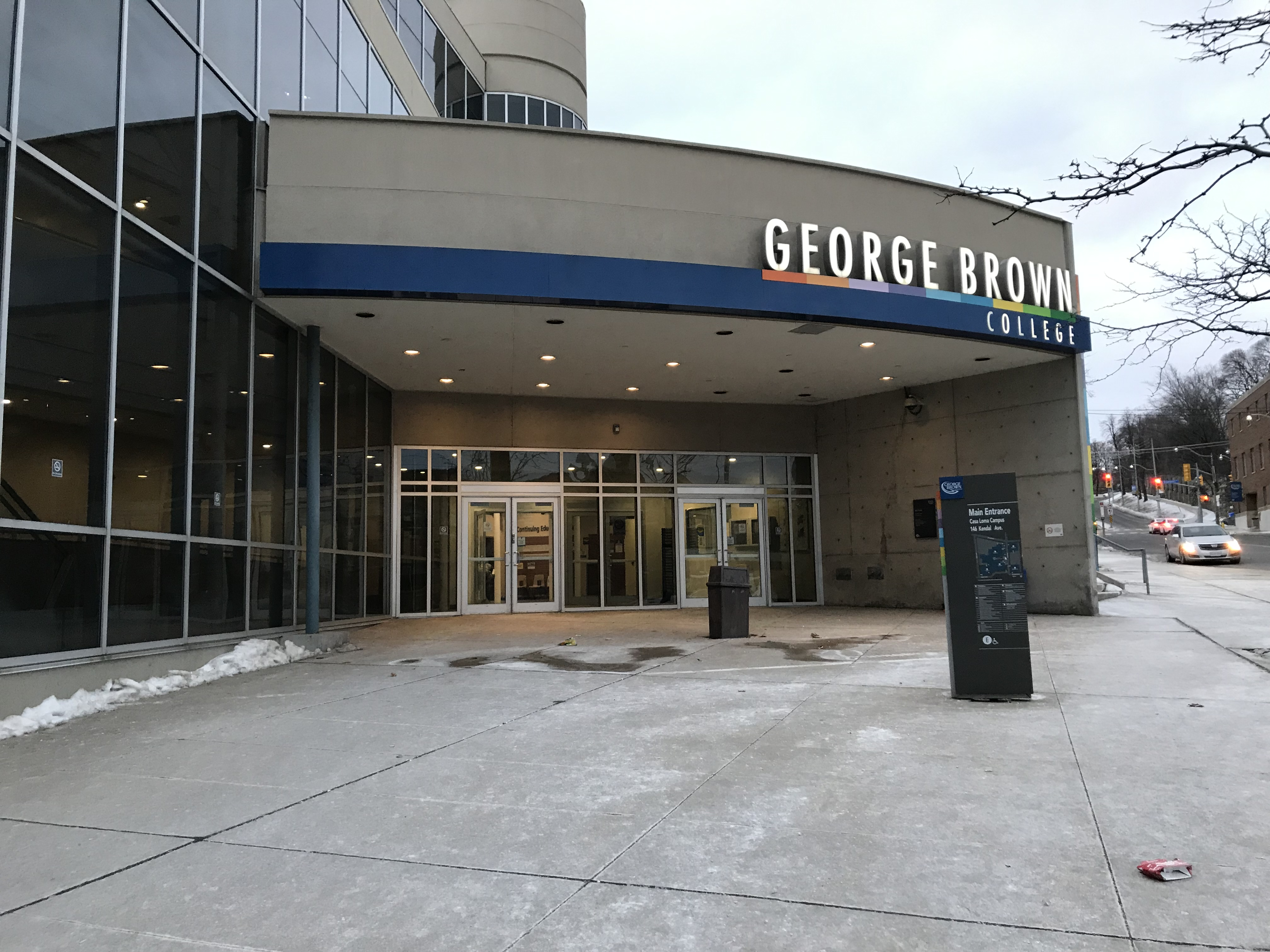
Casa Loma campus

43.6758°N 79.4107°W

Casa Loma campus is situated on the stretch of Kendal Ave. between Davenport Rd. and MacPherson Ave. Nearby features include Casa Loma, and the City of Toronto Archives. The campus itself is a collection of five buildings.

Casa Loma Campus
Bldg.	Address	Functions
C	160 Kendal Ave.	Main building of the campus & Daycare (Student Services, Student Life, Student Association)
D	1 Dartnell Ave.	Centre for Construction and Engineering Technologies
E	146 Kendal Ave.	Student centre & Centre for Construction and Engineering Technologies
F	500 McPherson Ave.	Finance and student records & Human Resources

In 2004, the old and mostly unused A building was torn down due to health concerns and to create a green space on campus. Students attending classes in building A were experiencing illness, thought to be due to sick building syndrome. There is a moose sculpture stood in the green space until 2012 or 2013.

=== St. James campus ===
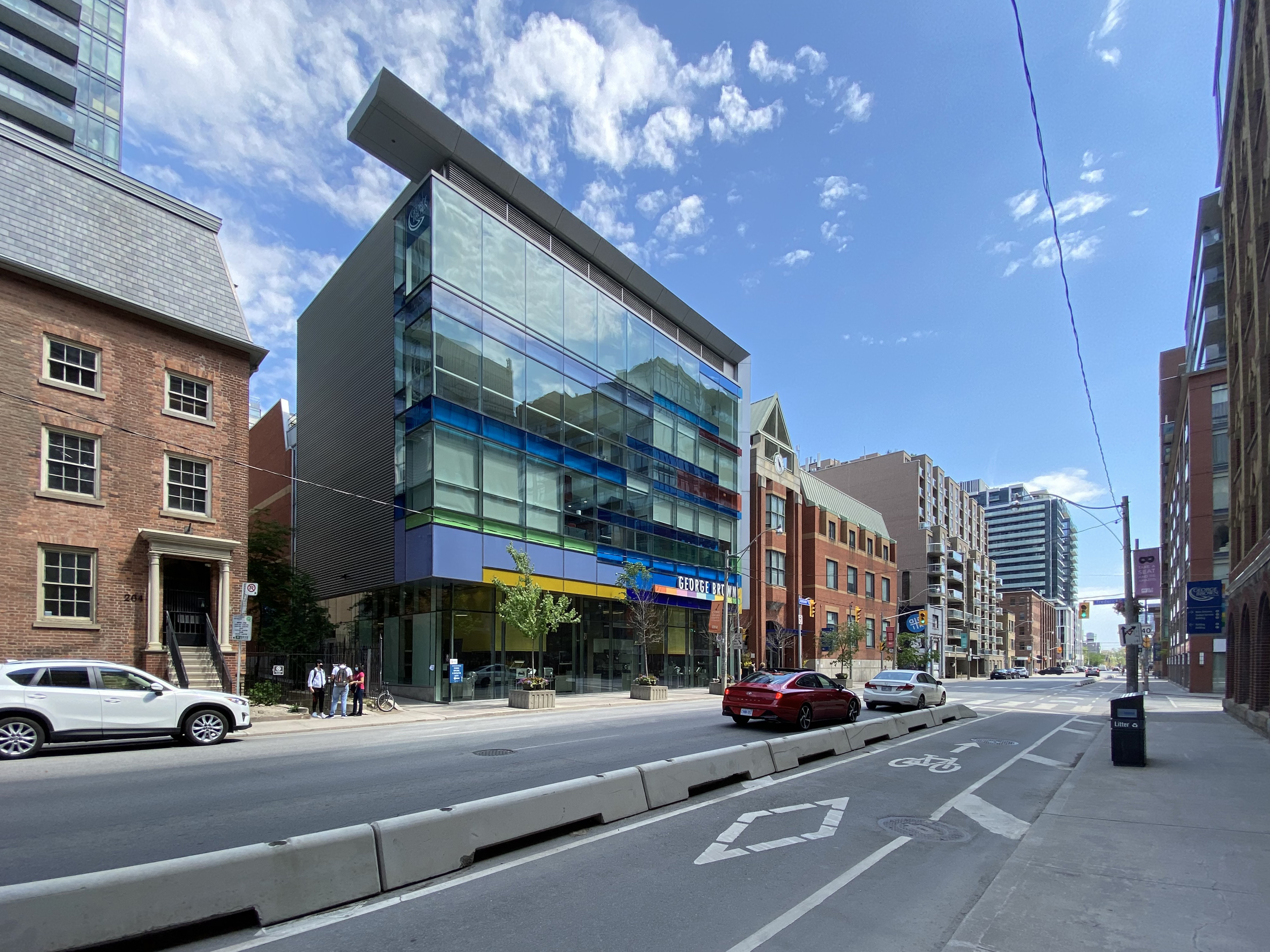
George Brown Chef School

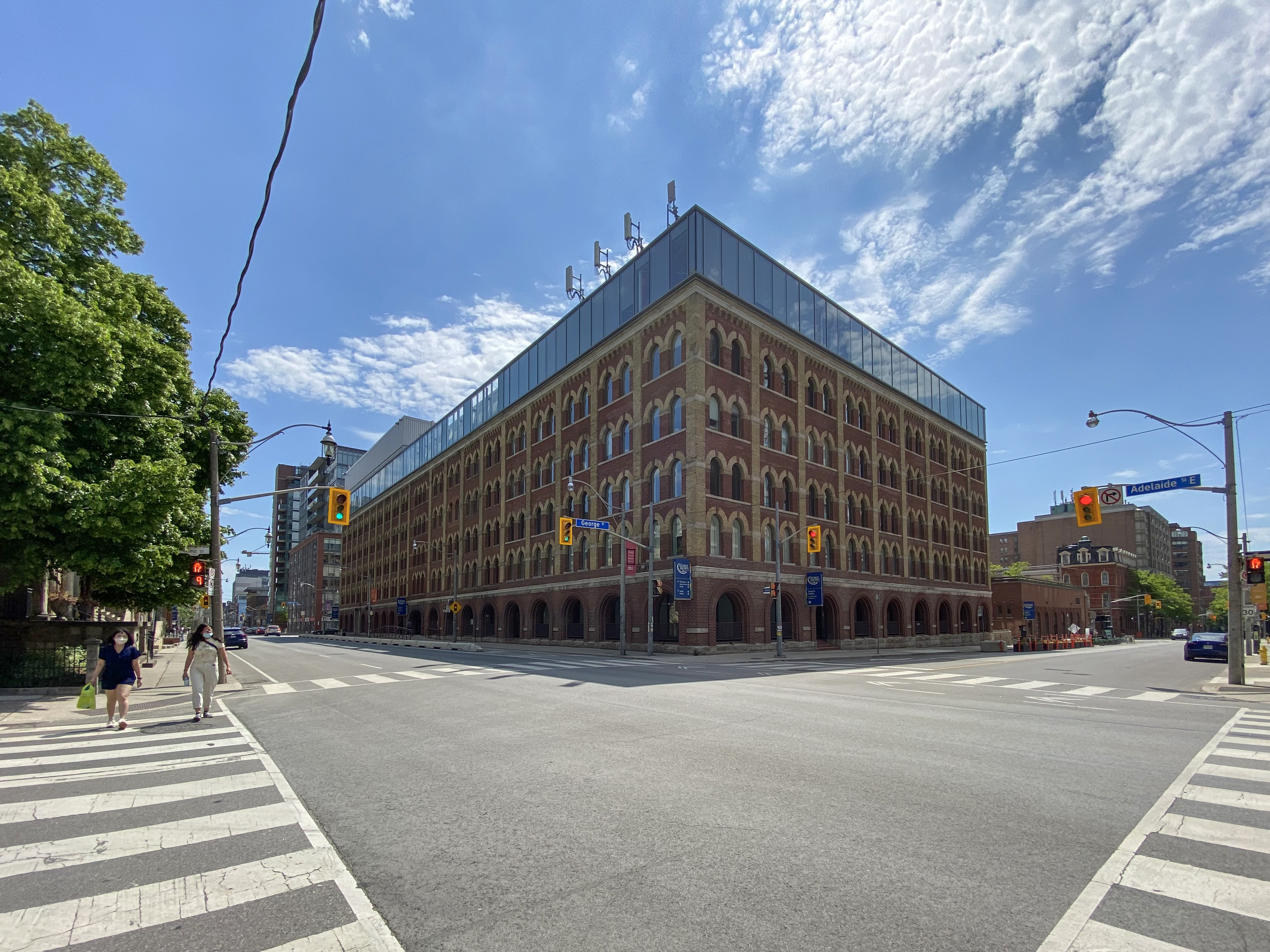
A Building

St. James campus consists of five buildings. The first is a large brick building at 200 King St. E. The second and third are located at 290 and 300 Adelaide St. East and are connected. They are home to Financial services, Creative Arts, Business Administration and the faculty of Centre for Hospitality and Culinary Arts. This campus is where the chef school is located.

St. James Campus
Bldg.	Address	Functions
A	200 King St. East	Main building of the campus (President's Office, Student Services, Student Life, Student Association)
B	300 Adelaide St. East	Centre for Hospitality and Culinary arts (classrooms, labs, student support services)
C	290 Adelaide St. East	Centre for Business
D	215 King St. East	Centre for Hospitality and Culinary arts (classrooms, Chefs House – student-staffed restaurant)
E	230 Richmond St. East	School of Design
F	210 King Street East	Alumni Offices, Marketing & Communications, and George Brown College Foundation
G	193 King Street East	School of Makeup and Esthetics & Continuing Education Office
H	341 King Street East	School of English as a Second Language & School of Design

=== Waterfront campus ===
43.6446°N 79.3643°W

In September 2012, George Brown opened the Waterfront Campus located at 51 Dockside Dr., south of Queen's Quay between Jarvis and Parliament Streets (between Corus Quay and Redpath Sugar Refinery). This campus is home to the centre for Health Sciences. In 2019, the college expanded its Waterfront Campus to the Daniels Waterfront - City of the Arts complex at 3 Lower Jarvis St. - home to the School of Design. And the latest Waterfront Campus expansion, Limberlost Place, officially opened at 185 Queens Quay E. in 2025. The 10-storey tall-wood, mass-timber building is the first institutional building of its kind in Ontario and houses the School of Architectural Studies. It also houses a research institute and a child care centre.

=== Toronto Metropolitan University campus ===
This associate campus is in the Sally Horsfall Eaton building (SHE building) at Toronto Metropolitan University. The address is 99 Gerrard St. E.

George Brown also has classes from the Early Childhood Education, Early Childhood Assistant and Activation Coordinator Gerontology programs at the Sally Horsfall Eaton (SHE) Building at TMU (located at the corner of Gould St and Mutual St.).

=== Young Centre for the Performing Arts ===
The Theatre School at George Brown College presents a season of productions at the Young Centre for the Performing Arts in the Distillery District in downtown Toronto. It is a brand-new theatre built into 1800s-era Victorian industrial buildings, with the incorporation of additional teaching facilities. The theatre arts program enjoys a partnership with the Tarragon Theatre and Soulpepper Theatre Company.

== Student Residence, The George ==
George Brown's student residence, The George, opened in 2016. Located at 80 Cooperage St. E., near Cherry and Front streets, close to Toronto's Distillery District, the building was part of the 2015 Pan Am/Para Pan Am Games Athletes Village before George Brown took ownership.

The building also houses the Lucie and Thornton Blackburn Conference Centre. The facility is named after a wife and husband who escaped slavery and established Toronto's first cab company, helped found the Little Trinity Anglican Church and worked on anti-slavery initiatives. Their story is told in a student-created mural at the conference centre.

== Sports ==
The school's team name is the Huskies, and varsity sports include:

- Badminton
- Baseball
- Basketball
- Cross Country
- Esports
- Indoor Soccer
- Soccer
- Volleyball

The volleyball team has been coached by, among others, Olympian Sam Schachter.

== Student newspaper ==
The Dialog is a student newspaper at George Brown Polytechnic and a member of Canadian University Press. It is owned and operated by the Student Association of George Brown Polytechnic. Founded in 1974, The Dialog serves students on three downtown campuses and several satellite campuses as a bi-weekly paper focusing on news within the college. It is printed in tabloid format. Previous newspapers include The Globe (1967–71) and George Brown's Body (1971–73).

== Libraries ==
George Brown Polytechnic students have access to several libraries:

- 341 King St. Library Learning Commons
- Casa Loma Library Learning Commons
- Centre for Hospitality & Culinary Arts e-Library
- Toronto Metropolitan University – Sally Horsfall Eaton Academic Resource Centre
- St. James Library Learning Commons
- Waterfront Library Learning Commons
- Sunnybrook Health Science Centre Library – Orthotics & Prosthetics Collection

Each of the college libraries primarily house materials suitable for the programs taught at their respective campuses.

Students, faculty and staff have access to an extensive range of electronic resources including, ebooks, articles, and image databases. These are available for use in the library and remotely.

== Notable alumni ==
- Hannah Emily Anderson, actress
- Katherine Barrell, actress, writer, producer, director
- Samantha Bee, comedian, writer, actress, television host
- Shaun Benson, actor
- Ryder Britton, actor
- Robin Brûlé, actress
- Valerie Buhagiar, actress, film director
- Patrick Kwok-Choon, actor
- Darwyn Cooke, comics artist, writer, cartoonist, animator
- Lynn Crawford, television chef
- Christine Cushing, television personality
- Mary Jo Eustace, actress, singer, chef
- Natasha Falle, activist, professor, abolitionist
- Colton Gobbo, actor
- John Henry, politician
- Simin Keramati, multidisciplinary artist
- Daniel MacIvor, actor, playwright, theatre director, film director
- Dan MacKenzie, sports and marketing executive
- Michael Mahonen, actor, director, screenwriter
- Mark McEwan, celebrity chef
- Keith Mondesir, Saint Lucian politician
- Roger Mooking, chef, musician, TV host
- Jayde Nicole, model
- Aaron Poole, actor
- Rob Rainford, television chef, broadcaster
- Ted Reader, chef, author
- Lou Rinaldi, politician
- Gigi Gorgeous, YouTube personality
- Dainty Smith, actor and burlesque performer
- Michael Smith, Chef
- Aliyah, WWE professional

== See also ==
- Higher education in Ontario
- List of colleges in Ontario
