= The Vanished (podcast) =

True crime podcast

The Vanished Podcast
- Genre: True crime
- Language: English

Creative team
- Created by: Marissa Jones
- Written by: Marissa Jones (with Erika Gwynn or Anna Priestland for some episodes)

Cast and voices
- Hosted by: Marissa Jones
- Narrated by: Marissa Jones

Production
- Production: Marissa Jones

Technical specifications
- Audio format: podcast

Publication
- No. of episodes: 278 as of April 2021
- Original release: February 2016
- Provider: Wondery

Related
- Website: http://www.thevanishedpodcast.com/

The Vanished is a weekly podcast that focuses on the stories and circumstances of missing people, hosted by Marissa Jones. Most episodes feature interviews with the friends and family of the missing person, and sometimes the local law enforcement.

Since its launch in February 2016, The Vanished has received over 51 million downloads, and is currently part of the Wondery network. The show attempts to focus on people whose cases have been ignored by the media, such as people who are drug users or sex workers. Jones told the Daily Press, "A lot of our cases are not the ones that make the national headlines . . . So to have the chance to give these families a voice is very rewarding.”

Its tagline is "Covering missing persons, one episode at a time." Jones also has described the show as "Stories of the missing from those who knew them best."

== Production ==
Jones is the founder, producer, creator, and host. Erika Gwynn, of the podcast Apex and the Abyss, co-writes some of the episodes. Anna Priestland has also written some.

Jones started the show in 2016 as a hobby, then in 2017, left her job as a paralegal to work on the show full-time. She was partly inspired to start the podcast because of her great-grandfather, who disappeared in Philadelphia in 1928.

=== Families' involvement ===
Of her strategy creating the show, Jones said, "I have a case-submission form on my website and anybody can fill that out. It’s really mostly aimed at family and friends to fill it out because the show’s interview based. So what I do is I go out and talk to people, I request case files from the police department… I go in and I try to research any avenue I can get to bring new information to the public."

On social media, Jones said, "The whole point of the show is to give a voice to those who are searching for a missing loved one. I can't narrate their grief and pain. That is why interviews are so impactful."

== Notable cases ==
Some notable cases the podcast has covered include those of Evelyn Hartley, Annie McCarrick, and Jessica Heeringa.

=== Updates ===
A number of the featured people have been found deceased in the months and years following the airing of their episodes. Some of these people include Ebby Steppach, David Gipson Smith, Paige Johnson, Marty Teague, Holly Cantrell, Savannah Spurlock, Paul Miller, Jacob Hilkin, Eric Pracht, Emily Noble, Randy Cuddy, Carolyn Riggin, and Zachary Kennedy.

== Reception ==
BuzzFeed called the show "haunting, mini melodramas of loss."

Hillary Nelson, writing for Vulture, said, "The Vanished is absolutely heartbreaking. But the missing-persons series is an incredible service that allows listeners to submit their own stories, thus humanizing the worst moment in someone’s life. Bring your tissues." In another review, Nelson called it "possibly one of the best podcasts on reporting missing people out there."

Zoe Donaldson, writing for Oprah Magazine, called Jones "an empathetic ally."

Stephanie Osmanski from Parade.com included it on a list of "32 True Crime Podcasts Worthy of an Immediate Binge-Listen."

Marc Hoover, writing for the Clermont Sun, called the show "educational. It goes into great depth about sex trafficking and drug addiction. Unfortunately, many people on the podcast either have arrest records or past drug addictions. Regardless, just because a person has a drug addiction or criminal record, it doesn’t mean their case is any less deserving in receiving media coverage."

Writing for the National Post, Chris Selley said, "Often [Jones] just lets missing people’s families and friends talk, unedited, at great length, about the person they’re missing, and it’s incredibly compelling. These are people from all walks of life, from all over North America. Time and again I’m astonished at how eloquent they are, even in describing unimaginable agony. I feel weirdly connected to total strangers."

In April 2020, GQ included it on a list of the best podcasts to listen to while self-isolating, saying, "The Vanished is an unnerving but addictive listen; each episode is dedicated to someone who seems to have disappeared off the face of the earth. Nearly all of the cases they’ve explored remain unsolved, but host Marissa Jones has a gift of taking you inside the hidden lives of missing persons. For an example, check out the four-part series on the disappearance of Amos Mortier, where Jones lands exclusive interviews from family, friends, and law enforcement to piece together a case from 2004."

In August 2020, Marie Claire included it on a list of 50 best true crime podcasts, and called it "extremely gripping."

In September 2020, Denise Hamilton, writing for Alta, noted that The Vanished "provides a valuable public space where relatives and strangers alike can gather, mourn, rage, hypothesize, and hope."

== See also ==
- Ambiguous loss
- Cold Case Files
- List of people who disappeared mysteriously: post-1970
- List of people who disappeared mysteriously: pre-1970
- List of American crime podcasts
- Missing and Murdered (podcast)
- Operation Identify Me
