= Killing of Ebby Steppach =

Murder of teenager in Little Rock, Arkansas

Ebby Steppach
- Steppach c. 2014
- Born: Ebby Jane Steppach; March 31, 1997; Little Rock, Arkansas, U.S.
- Disappeared: October 24, 2015, Little Rock, U.S.
- Died: October 25, 2015 (aged 18); Little Rock, U.S.
- Body discovered: May 22, 2018, Chalamont Park, Little Rock 34.8099°N 92.5043°W

Ebby Jane Steppach (March 31, 1997 – October 25, 2015) was an American teenager who disappeared under mysterious circumstances in Little Rock, Arkansas. Days before her disappearance, she had accused four men of gang-raping her at a party she had attended. On October 25, 2015, she placed an erratic phone call to her older brother, Trevor; this was the last known contact anyone had with her.

On October 27, her abandoned car was discovered in Chalamont Park in west Little Rock. Searches of the woods in the park were undertaken, but no sign of Steppach was found. She remained a missing person for nearly three years before her body was discovered in a drainage pipe in Chalamont Park in May 2018, in the immediate vicinity of where her car had been found. She had been dead since the time her car was found three years prior. Her death has been classified as a homicide.

== Timeline ==
=== Background ===
Ebby Jane Steppach was an 18 year-old high school student in Little Rock, Arkansas who was completing her senior year at Little Rock Central High School. She had previously attended a private school, but transferred to a public school that year. Wanting independence from her parents, Steppach decided to move out of her family's home at the beginning of the school year, but was mainly staying with her grandparents and friends. On October 21, 2015, Steppach missed school. On Friday, October 23, she attended a party at some point during the evening.

The following day, October 24, 2015, Steppach arrived at her mother's home, and informed her stepfather that she had been gang raped by four individuals at the party and wanted to report the incident to authorities. She also alleged that the rape had been recorded on a cell phone. Later that evening, when Steppach's mother, Laurie Jernigan, and stepfather attempted to reach her by phone, they got no response; her stepfather suspected she had gone to retrieve the video of her rape. That evening, two brief calls lasting approximately one minute each were placed to the Little Rock Police Department from Steppach's cell phone, though the police department would state they had no record of receiving a report. Throughout the evening, cell phone records showed Steppach sent text messages to several of the men she had implicated in her rape, threatening to report them to police.

=== Disappearance ===
Steppach last had contact with her older brother, Trevor, around 2 p.m. on October 25, 2015, in a phone call. Trevor described her as seeming "disoriented" during their conversation. She initially told him she was parked outside his house, but upon hanging up and walking out to the street, he did not see her car. When he called her back, she answered, this time telling him she was in her car but was unsure where she was parked. After she told him "I'm fucked up", the phone call ended. This was the last known contact anyone had with her.

On October 27, Steppach's 2003 Volkswagen Passat was discovered by a security guard abandoned in a parking lot near a wooded area in Chalamont Park, a neighborhood park in west Little Rock. The security guard notified police and waited approximately 2 hours for an officer to arrive however none did. The next day, after seeing the vehicle still there as he did his rounds, he once again called and waited for police, who finally arrived around an hour later and discovered it belonged to Steppach. The car had an empty gas tank as well as a dead battery, and the key had been left in the ignition.

=== Investigation ===
Several searches of Chalamont Park were undertaken after the discovery of Steppach's car, though no additional evidence was found in the surrounding woods. Per a 2017 report, the men Steppach had accused of rape had all spoken to police, though no formal searches of their cell phones were done for the alleged video of Steppach's rape. In an attempt to bring publicity to her case, Steppach's mother and step-father appeared on Dr. Phil in December 2017. The Steppach family offered a reward of $50,000 with information leading to their daughter's discovery.

=== Discovery of body ===
Around 10 a.m. on May 24, 2018, while performing another search of Chalamont Park, police discovered skeletal remains in a drainage pipe in the vicinity where Steppach's car had been discovered. These remains were subsequently confirmed to be those of Steppach. Extensive searches for Steppach at Chalamont Park had been held in the past. Margie Foley, a family friend and mother of one of Steppach's best friends, told police she had smelled decomposition while doing a private search of the area, and alerted the authorities. Upon the arrival of police at the scene, Foley claimed she was "kind of dismissed by [the officers]", who told her the park had been searched with recovery canines who would have picked up on the scent of human decomposition, and assured her it "must be an animal or something".

== Media depictions ==
In 2017, her case was profiled on the podcast The Vanished.

In December 2017, the story of Steppach's disappearance was featured on Dr. Phil.

== See also ==
- List of solved missing person cases (2010s)
- List of unsolved murders (2000–present)
