= Dainty Smith =

Toronto-based actor, playwright, and burlesque performer

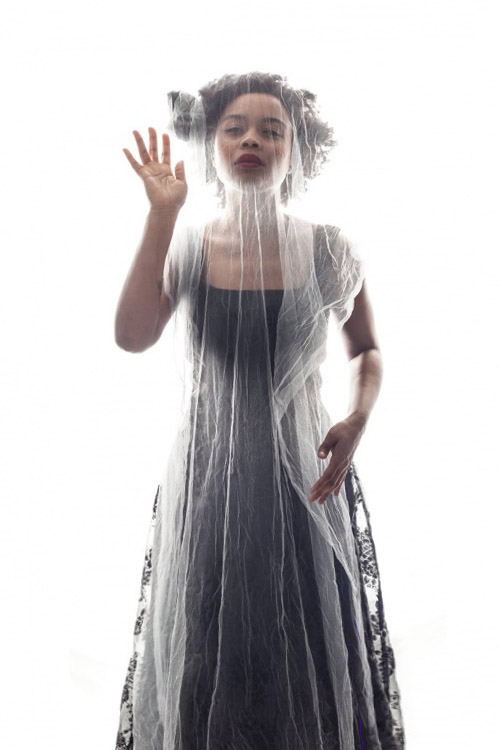
- Dainty Smith in 2017
- Born: Montego Bay, Jamaica
- Other name: Dainty Box (burlesque)
- Education: George Brown College
- Occupations: Storyteller, Burlesque performer, actor, playwright
- Years active: 2010–present
- Known for: founder, Les Femmes Fatales: Women of Colour Burlesque Troupe
- Website: daintysmith.com

Dainty Smith is a Toronto-based actor, playwright, and burlesque performer. She is the founder of Les Femmes Fatales: Women of Colour Burlesque Troupe, Canada's first burlesque troupe for Black women and women of colour, femmes and gender non-conforming persons. Her interdisciplinary work engages themes of glamour, afrofuturism, queer thriving, body positivity, and Blackness.

== Personal life and education ==
Smith was born in Montego Bay, Jamaica and was raised in Thorold, Ontario. She studied Performing Arts at George Brown College in Toronto. CBC writer Lucius Dechausay calls Smith "a preacher's daughter turned storyteller and performer." Smith identifies as queer and bisexual, an aspect of her identity that informs her work.

== Career ==
Working across several creative roles as an actor, producer, writer, and burlesque performer, Smith uses the art of storytelling to tell deeply vulnerable stories regarding race, religion, sexuality and challenging social boundaries. During the 2010s she became well known as co-producer for the independent performance art collective Colour Me Dragg and as founder of Les Femmes Fatales: Women of Colour Burlesque Troupe, made up of Black women, women of colour, and their allies. Smith has written articles for Sway magazine, About magazine, and Xtra!. Additionally, she has published a series of autobiographical essays entitled, Femmoirs of a Burlesque Performer. She has starred in two films, How To Stop A Revolution and Red Lips (cages for black girls). Smith is an active member of Toronto's queer community as an organizer, activist, and performer. In her work, Smith imagines a world where policed queer and non-binary people of colour thrive despite systemic injustice.

=== Playwright and acting work ===
Smith has performed at numerous venues and festivals across Toronto including Mayworks Festival, Rock. Paper. Sistahz Festival, the Rhubarb Festival, Gladstone Hotel, Buddies in Bad Times Theatre, the Tranzac Club, Artscape, Harbourfront Centre, and Daniels Spectrum Theatre. In 2013 she participated in Kill Joy's Kastle: A Lesbian Haunted House conceived by artist Allyson Mitchell.

In 2017, Smith wrote Daughters Of Lilith, a play that premiered at Buddies in Bad Times. The play was directed by Ravyn Wngz, a frequent collaborator of Smith's. The play featured an entirely Black female cast and tells the story of six sisters bound together through blood, Blackness, and femininity. Each sister has a dual nature, which, according to Smith, is symbolic of the vital dual nature in all women. It is a story about how Black women survive love, loss, heartbreak, misogynoir and trauma. The sisters reunite in the forest, searching for their mother Lilith and for ways to remember their personal and collective magic.

=== Arts education ===
Smith has created and lead the 'Body Love' movement workshop at The 519 for queer and trans youth with a focus on radical body positivity, empowerment, and self love. Smith has also lectured at Ryerson University, University of Ottawa, and York University on the subversive power of glamour, Blackness, the political nature of burlesque, and queer thriving. Mentorship is important to Smith, who sees it as a responsibility to share her knowledge with new performers. Smith's energy and commitment to burlesque is rooted in the sisterhood that develops when women support each other, particularly those from marginalized communities. She wants more young women of colour to take the stage and define burlesque on their own terms.

== Burlesque ==
In 2009 Smith became a full-time burlesque performer, using the pseudonym, Dainty Box. She performs burlesque as a combination of theatre, storytelling, and seduction to express themes of body positivity and sex positivity. For Smith, being a queer Black burlesque performer is an intersectional-feminist act, offering a positive female role model that celebrates the breadth and complexity of female sexuality. She expresses the importance of telling stories through her own body – not as a secondary object or as somebody else's object, but purely her own stating that, "I’m interested in the ways in which I can reclaim my body and find self-love as a black woman on a platform. We tell stories onstage, loving and owning our bodies. Being able to do that is a defiant act." CanCulture writer Isabelle Kirkwood states that Smith's "religious upbringing shaped her focus on the “sacredness and holiness” of marginalized women's bodies." Room writer Nav Nagra adds that this background has allowed Smith to use storytelling and performance to address topics of race, religion, and sexuality, melding her work in burlesque, acting, and writing. Themes of afrofuturism and the historical legacy of Black women's labour are present in Smith's burlesque, as well as in other forms of her artistic practice. She states, "I always wonder what Black women would talk about if they didn't have to take care of everyone else."

=== Influences ===
Smith regularly cites Josephine Baker as a key influence, whom she explains taught her that beauty, glamour, and style were accessible to Black girls. For Smith, seeing archival footage of Baker was "a ‘light-bulb’ moment – changing how she viewed herself as a young black woman. She says "It gave me permission to consider myself pretty – possibly even beautiful.” In addition to Baker, Smith is inspired by Black entertainers such as Eartha Kitt, Dorothy Dandridge, and Lena Horne, as well as the ladies of the church she previously attended in Thorold whom she describes as her "style icons." Writers Zadie Smith, Gwendolyn Brooks, Toni Morrison, and Maya Angelo are also key influences on Smith's work and practice.

=== Les Femmes Fatales: Women of Colour Burlesque Troupe ===
In 2010 Smith founded Les Femmes Fatales: Women of Colour Burlesque Troupe. In a 2017 CBC interview, Smith shared that she found empowerment as an artist through burlesque performing – and after seeing women of colour fetishized and underrepresented in Toronto's otherwise thriving burlesque scene, "she decided to do something about it."

Smith's Les Femmes Fatales spotlights brown and black females of varied body types, ethnicity, and gender expressions. The troupe's name is inspired by cinematic femmes fatales, characters who Smith has long identified with, stating that, "I didn’t see them as bad people, I saw them as survivors – women who had been through hell and back....The femmes fatales had war wounds and knew how to be glamorous in spite of those wounds..." Of this trailblazing troupe, artist and activist Ravyn Wngz recently shared: "When Dainty Smith founded Les Femmes Fatales, she changed the game for black and brown, queer and non-binary folks here in Toronto and in North America. They weren't any burlesque spaces for us before and she's created quite the platform for us to be seen and showcased."

== Collaborators ==
Smith has been integral to Toronto's cultural scene, frequently collaborating with other artists who foreground activism and Blackness in their artistic practice. Smith often works with Ravyn Wngz and Syrus Marcus Ware. Wngz and Smith have produced the 'Body Love' workshop at The 519, while Wngz is a member of Les Femmes Fatales. Smith and Wngz were featured performers in Ware's Antarctica (2019), a mixed-media installation commissioned by the 2019 Toronto Biennial. Smith was also the subject of a large scale charcoal portrait by Ware, exhibited as part of his Activist Portrait Series (2015–16) shown at the Art Gallery of Ontario in 2017.

== Reception ==
Smith has garnered considerable media attention, particularly for her burlesque performance and role as founder of Les Femmes Fatales. In 2017 she was featured on the CBC Television series Exhibitionists for her leadership role within Toronto's burlesque community. The episode referenced the phrase "black thighs save lives" which Smith coined to describe the empowerment that results from the daring and vulnerable performances created by Les Femmes Fatales. CBC writer Peter Knegt has called Les Femmes Fatales the "premiere burlesque troupe for Black women and women of colour, femmes and gender non-conforming persons."
