= Street Cents =

Canadian financial literacy TV series

- Main title
- Created by: John Nowlan
- Written by: Andrea Dorfman; Ian Johnston; Dan Hughes; Ian Boothby; Roger Fredericks; Louise Moon
- Directed by: Ron Murphy; Henry Sarwer-Foner; Stephen Hall
- Starring: Jonathan Torrens (1989–1999); Brian Heighton (1989–1997); Benita Ha (1989–1993); Jamie Bradley (1989–1994); Anna Dirksen (1994–1999); Demore Barnes (1996–1999); Kim D'Eon (1999–2003)
- Country of origin: Canada
- Original language: English
- No. of seasons: 17
- No. of episodes: 923

Production
- Production locations: Halifax, Nova Scotia
- Running time: 30 minutes

Original release
- Network: CBC Television
- Release: March 15, 1989 – October 1, 2006

Street Cents is a newsmagazine TV series directed at teenagers that originally aired on CBC Television between 1989 and 2006. Street Cents focused on consumer and media awareness for young people. The series was created by producer John Nowlan. He cites Britain's Pocket Money as one of the inspirations for Street Cents. The show has won several Gemini Awards and even an International Emmy for Best Youth Programming or Series. The series was lauded by critics for its efforts to be inclusive and representative of Canada's youth. The theme song for several seasons was "Where Does My Money Go?" by Thrush Hermit.

Like CBC's Marketplace, the show aired without commercial interruption, because the producers did not want the bias of advertising revenue to affect the potential criticism of the advertisers' products and/or services. The show promoted safety and ethics and action while empowering young people. Sponsor logos were briefly seen in the end credits of episodes in a manner akin to public television in the United States.

In August 2006, the network airing Street Cents, CBC Television, decided to cancel the series as its target demographic, teens and preteens, have shown a decline of viewership. The last episode aired October 1, 2006, leaving CBC-TV with no programs aimed at its target demographic.

One of the original hosts of the show, Jonathan Torrens, started a YouTube reboot of the series in 2019 called Your Two Cents. The CBC subsequently announced its own revival of the Street Cents brand as a TikTok, Instagram and YouTube account in 2022, hosted by Anisha Joshi, Mercedes Gaztambide and Ian (Creo) Walters.

== Pilot ==
In 1988, CBC Halifax created a pilot for the show that would become Street Cents. The working title for the program was Moneypenny. The pilot was written by John Nowlan and Gary Vermier. Produced and directed by John Nowlan.

== Seasons 1–8 ==
Originally, there were 3 hosts (Jamie Bradley, Benita Ha and Chris Lydon-- Jonathan Torrens replaced Lydon later in Season 1) and a sneaky salesman named Ken Pompadour (played by Brian Heighton) and various pigs and hedgehogs named after coins. Season 1 featured a pink pig named Penny, Season 2 had a pink and black pig named Nickel and Season 3, a pot-bellied pig called Moui (Vietnamese for 'dime') and then hedgehogs One-Bit & Two-Bit. Ken was a weak-willed lackey for the "evil" corporation BuyCo, which always sold inferior, overpriced and shoddy products, and marketed how great their products were in a stereotypical parody fashion. Every week, Ken would try to sell the viewers and hosts BuyCo products and every week the hosts would foil his scheme. Eventually, Ken's boss (whose face was never seen but was secretly played by host Jamie Bradley) died over Aruba, and Ken got promoted to the head of BuyCo. As boss, Ken's image changed completely, as he was cool, wore all black leather (including pants), had a goatee, and always was able to snap his hand to reveal an item for dramatic effect. He also had his own team of lackeys or "yes men". Since Brian Heighton left the show, the BuyCo storyline completely disappeared, and the show became less story oriented. Jamie Bradley left the show in 1994 as host and was replaced by Anna Dirksen but made cameo appearances for several years after.

== Seasons 9–17 ==
By the ninth season, Street Cents took on a more news-magazine style while maintaining a focus on empowering young people to make their own educated decisions about the media and products they consume. Despite being based in Halifax, the show still maintained its efforts to include all of Canada in the segments it produces by featuring segments from across Canada in each episode. During the final few years, the show also expanded by featuring segments on various teen issues such as divorce, interracial dating, and eating disorders.

Studio segments in Seasons 11 and 12 were directed by Stephen Hall. Both seasons were nominated for both Gemini and iEmmy awards. In 2001, episode four from Season 12 won both the Gemini and iEmmy.

== Common segments ==
- What's your beef? (Viewers send letters, phone calls, and emails to be investigated by the hosts or a guest viewer.)
- Fit for the Pit (An inferior product, which the producers believe is not worth paying for, is dramatically tossed into a fiery pit inside the Street Cents studio.)
- Me Inc. (A profile about a teenage entrepreneur who works hard to create a niche business that benefits the teenager and is ethical.)
- Street Test (Real teenagers/children test out a variety of products blindly to see which one is the best. The most expensive and/or marketed is usually not the best and is sometimes the worst.)
- Streeters (Person on the street interviews with adolescents/teenagers. Usually airs at the beginning and at the end of the show.)

== Original cast ==
- Jamie Bradley as himself; and played the BuyCo Boss in seasons 1, 3 & 5
- Benita Ha as Benita
- Brian Heighton as Ken Pompadour
- Chris Lydon
- Jonathan Torrens as Jonathan

== Final season hosts ==
- Gelareh Darabi
- Allie Dixon
- Eli Goree

== Past cast members ==
- Colleen Hammill
- Demore Barnes
- Rachael Clark
- Kim D'Eon
- Anna Dirksen
- Andrew Bush
- Eli Goree
- Duane Hall
- Darryl Kyte
- Tania Rudolph
- Michael Scholar, Jr.
- Connie Walker
- Denise Wong
- Darrien Genereux
- Alison Dixon
