= Connie Walker (journalist) =

Canadian journalist

- Born: 1979 (age 46–47); Okanese First Nation
- Education: First Nations University of Canada; University of Regina
- Occupation: Journalist
- Notable credit(s): 8th fire, Missing and Murdered
- Awards: Canadian Association of Journalists awards: Don McGillivray investigative award, Online Media award

Connie Walker (born 1979) is a Canadian First Nations (Okanese Cree) journalist. She won the Pulitzer Prize for Audio Reporting in 2023 for the investigative journalism podcast Stolen: Surviving St. Michael's.

== Early life and education ==
Walker grew up in the Okanese First Nation, in Saskatchewan. She describes growing up in a remarkably large and close family. She has 13 siblings and both of her parents also have large families.

Walker was awarded a Joan Donaldson Newsworld Scholarship while studying at Saskatchewan Indian Federated College, which provided her with an opportunity to work as an intern for CBC Newsworld. She graduated in journalism from the Saskatchewan Indian Federated College, and subsequently graduated from the University of Regina.

== Career ==
Walker says her first act of journalism was an article she wrote for her high school newspaper about the brutal murder of a young First Nations woman and the institutional racism in the investigation and reporting of that murder. Walker was employed for the 2000, 2001 and 2002 seasons as a host for Street Cents, a youth-oriented consumer and media awareness show, while she was still a journalism student in Saskatchewan.

After graduation, Walker took a permanent position with the Canadian Broadcasting Corporation. She served as host of Living Saskatchewan, and as a reporter and producer for CBC News: Sunday and the flagship CBC news show The National. In the fall of 2009, Walker became a correspondent for Connect with Mark Kelley. In 2013 she helped produce the acclaimed 8th Fire documentary on contemporary Indigenous life. In December 2013, Walker was appointed lead reporter for the CBC's Indigenous reporting unit.

On February 6, 2015, The Eyeopener, the student newspaper at Toronto Metropolitan University, quoted comments Walker made during a panel on Indigenous Representation in Canada's media:

Often news focuses on the really depressing stories... We want to provide a better context to some of these stories and increase the amount of indigenous voices that make it on mainstream media and hopefully provide a better understanding of the aboriginal communities.

The Eyeopener also described how Walker told her audience about her disappointment over the disparity in coverage she noticed of two young girls who disappeared at roughly the same time.

In December 2015 CBC Radio broadcast a 14-minute program entitled "Connie Walker and the firsthand legacy of residential schools", in which she described the horror of residential schools through her family's experience, and reporting on the Truth and reconciliation commission. One of the last residential schools to remain in operation was near Walker's home, the Okanese First Nation. She described learning how grandparents were survivors of the residential school system.

On October 25, 2016, the CBC News published Walker's eight-part investigative podcast, Missing and Murdered, focused on the murder of Alberta Williams in 1989 along the Highway of Tears in British Columbia. Chatelaine magazine and Flare magazine interviewed Walker the week the podcast went online.

In 2018 Walker launched season two of her Missing and Murdered podcast, focused on finding the truth behind the life and death of Cleopatra Nicotine Semaganis, who was removed from her family as part of the Sixties Scoop.

On November 17, 2016, Toronto Metropolitan University's School of Journalism invited Walker, Karyn Pugliese, and Tanya Talaga to a panel on covering Indigenous issues.

Walker left CBC in 2019 and went to Gimlet Media, which was acquired by Spotify. In February 2021, Walker launched her podcast series Stolen: The Search for Jermain investigating the Missing and Murdered Indigenous Woman case of Jermain Charlo from the Flathead Indian Reservation in Montana. Spotify closed Gimlet Media in 2023, but Walker was allowed to continue working on Stolen until 2024.

In 2025, she was selected for the Velma Rogers Research Chair at Toronto Metropolitan University, where she hopes to work on a new podcast.

== Awards and recognition ==
In 2009, Okanese, a personal documentary Walker produced about the community in which she grew up, earned an honourable mention at the Columbus International Film & Video Festival.

On May 29, 2016, Walker and colleagues at the CBC's Aboriginal news unit, won the Canadian Association of Journalists' Don McGillivray Investigative Award and its Online Media Award, for the stories on its "Missing and murdered Indigenous women and girls" website.

Walker was honoured as one of the YWCA's "Women of Distinction" in 2017.

Her work on the Missing & Murdered: Who Killed Alberta Williams podcast was recognized with a Webby Award nomination in the Documentary/Podcasts & Digital Audio category in 2017.

In 2018, Walker's media work was recognized by her inclusion on Open Canada's annual Twitterarti Indigenous voices list. Also in 2018, Missing and Murdered: Finding Cleo won best serialized story at the Third Cost International Audio Festival.

In 2023, Walker was singled out among the staff of Gimlet Media for a Pulitzer Prize in Audio Reporting for Stolen: Surviving St. Michael's.

== Personal life ==
Walker has one daughter.
