= Okanese First Nation =

Cree-Saulteaux band government

Coordinates: 50°55′38″N 103°22′00″W

- Band No. 382
- People: Cree; Saulteaux
- Treaty: Treaty 4
- Headquarters: Balcarres
- Province: Saskatchewan

Land
- Main reserve: Okanese 82
- Reserves: Okanese 82(A) through; Okanese 82(HH)

Population
- On reserve: 283
- Off reserve: 452
- Total population: 735

Government
- Chief: Richard Stonechild

Tribal Council
- File Hills Qu'Appelle Tribal Council

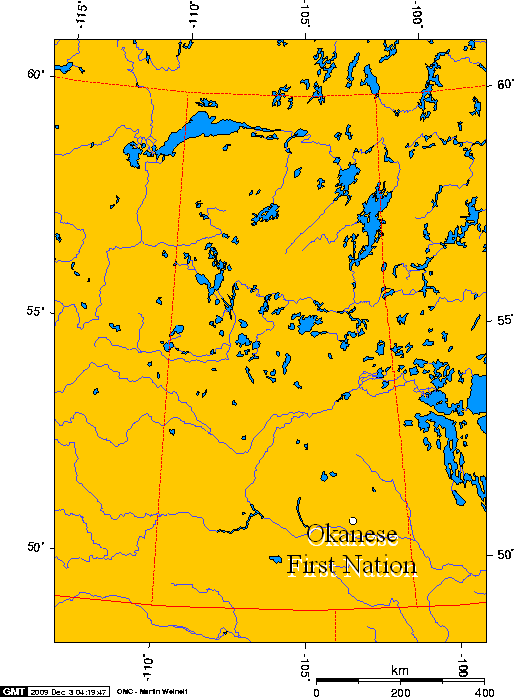
Okanee First Nation in Saskatchewan

The Okanese First Nation (Cree: ᐅᑭᓃᐢ, okinîs, literal meaning: Little Rose-hip) is a Cree-Saulteaux First Nation band government in Balcarres, Saskatchewan, Canada.

The Okanese First Nation was a signatory to Treaty number four. It is named after a leader named Okanis, who signed the treaty on their behalf, on September 9, 1875. The Nation's population was 104 in 1879. 225 of the 459 members lived on the Nation's Reserve in 1999.

In June 2008 Canwest reported Marie-Anne Day Walker-Pelletier the Chief of the Okanese since 1981, was the longest-serving female Chief in Saskatchewan.

In September 2016, they became a signatory of the Buffalo Treaty.

== Notable births ==
- Dawn Dumont, writer
- Connie Walker (1979), journalist
- Richard Wolfe, gangster.
- Danny Wolfe, gangster.
