= Missing and Murdered (podcast) =

True crime podcast by the CBC

Publication
- Provider: Canadian Broadcasting Corporation

Related
- Website: www.cbc.ca/mediacentre/program/missing-and-murdered

Missing and Murdered is a true crime podcast investigating the disappearances of Indigenous people in Canada, also known as the Missing and Murdered Indigenous Women crisis. It is produced by the Canadian Broadcasting Corporation and hosted by Cree journalist Connie Walker (Okanese First Nation).

The show won Best Serialized Story at the 2018 Third Coast International Audio Festival and Kari Paul wrote in The Guardian that the show is a "rare and elusive non-exploitative true crime podcast".

== Overview ==
The podcast is produced by the Canadian Broadcasting Corporation, producer Marnie Luke, and hosted by Cree journalist Connie Walker (Okanese First Nation). Walker worked on the 8th Fire project, which led to the creation of section of the CBC specifically dedicated to coverage of Indigenous issues. The podcast has also discussed the Sixties Scoop.

== Seasons ==
=== Season one: Missing and Murdered: Who Killed Alberta Williams? ===
Beginning in 2016, the eight-part first season examines the Missing and Murdered Indigenous Women crisis in Canada through the lens of a specific case, the murder of Alberta Williams in 1989 along the Highway of Tears in British Columbia. The series was nominated for a Webby Award.

=== Season two: Missing and Murdered: Finding Cleo ===
Airing in 2018, the second season investigates the disappearance of Cleopatra Semaganis Nicotine from the Little Pine First Nation in Saskatchewan, Canada. The United States Department of Justice has reported that Indigenous women are 10 times more likely to be murdered than the national average and that one out of three Indigenous women will be victims of sexual violence in their lifetime.

=== Season three: Missing and Murdered: True Consequences ===
In 2019 the podcast continued coverage of the MMIWG crisis and featured an interview with Cheyenne Antonio from the Coalition to Stop Violence Against Native Women.

== See also ==
- Missing white woman syndrome
- Operation Identify Me
- The Vanished (podcast)
