= Saskia Garel =

Jamaican-Canadian actress

- Born: Saskia Garel; 9 December 1969 (age 56); Kingston, Jamaica
- Education: York University
- Occupations: Actress, singer-songwriter
- Years active: 1991–present
- Spouse(s): Steven Allerick (m. 2006–present)
- Children: 2

Saskia Garel (born December 9, 1969) is a Jamaican-Canadian musician and actress.

== Early life and education ==
Garel was born in Kingston, Jamaica and immigrated to Toronto, Canada at an early age. She graduated from York University with a Bachelor of Fine Arts Honours degree and was awarded the Oscar Peterson Award.

== Career ==
During her four years at York, she performed in the group Coconut Groove (top 40, Latin, and world beat music) and played the Toronto nightclub circuit. It was with Coconut Groove that she was discovered by Richie Mayer and David Bendeth (A&R with BMG Music) and was signed to a record deal as a member of the group Love and Sas. She went on to win two Juno Awards for best R&B recording for "Call My Name" and "Once in a Lifetime" two years in a row off the same album. Love and Sas toured Canada, the US and the UK, had 3 top ten hits on the Canadian charts and had 5 music videos running in high rotation on Much Music.

Garson played the role of Mimi in the Canadian production of the musical Rent. While on tour with Rent in Vancouver, she got the part of Jasmine, a singer, on the television series Nightman, and appeared in ten episodes of the final season. This meant she was filming during the day and performing as Mimi at night.

== Personal life ==
Garel is married to fellow actor Steven Allerick whom she met while playing Nala in The Lion King.

== Filmography ==
=== Film ===
Year	Title	Role	Notes
1996	Mistrial	Reporter #8	TV movie
2000	A Tale of Two Bunnies	Judy	TV movie

=== Television ===
Year	Title	Role	Notes
1997	The Newsroom	-	Episode: "Meltdown: Part 3"
1999	Night Man	Jasmine	Recurring cast: season 2
2002	Earth: Final Conflict	Claire Jackson	Episode: "Deep Sleep"
2002	Spynet	Usher	TV series
2002	Tracker	Gina Newcastle	Episode: "Eye of the Storm"
2003	Platinum	-	Episode: "Loyalty"
2004	She Spies	Gina Dominic	Episode: "Remember When"
2004	Wild Card	Jamie Rodrigue	Episode: "Bound and Gagged, Your Husband Was Snagged"
2004–2006	One on One	Danielle	Recurring cast: season 4, guest: season 5
