= Under =

Under may refer to:

== Music ==
- Under, an album by Savoy, 2024
- "Under" (Alex Hepburn song), 2013
- "Under" (Pleasure P song), 2009
- "Under", a song by Sampha from Process, 2017

== People ==
- Bülent Ünder (born 1949), Turkish footballer
- Cengiz Ünder (born 1997), Turkish footballer
- Marie Under (1883–1980), Estonian poet

== Other uses ==
- Under (restaurant), an underwater restaurant in Lindesnes, Norway
- Under, a 2011 short film by Mark Raso

== See also ==
- Over–under (disambiguation)
