= Sheldon & Tracy Levy Student Learning Centre =

Student centre of Toronto Metropolitan University, Canada

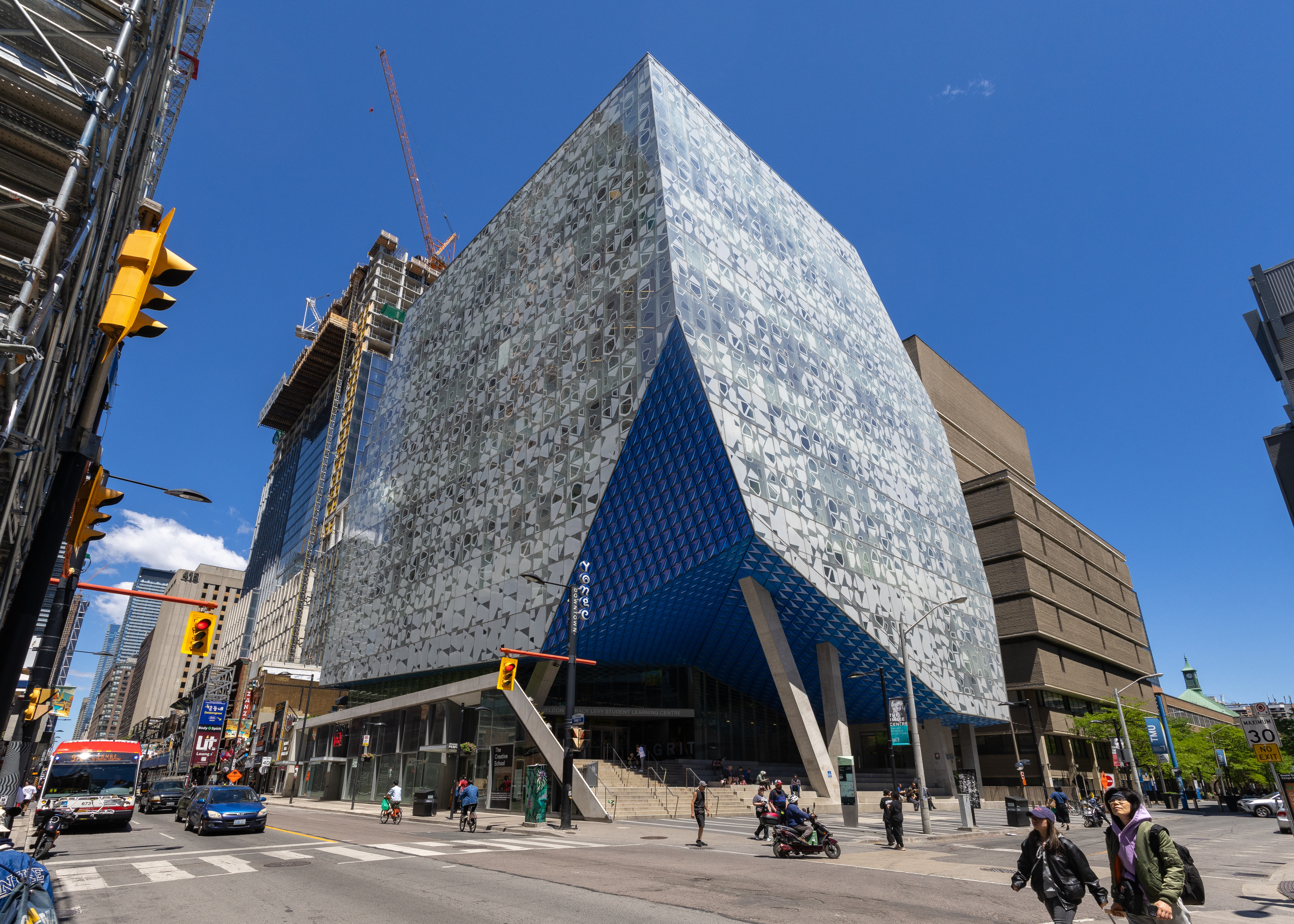
- The Student Learning Centre in 2026

General information
- Type: Educational
- Location: Downtown Toronto, 341 Yonge Street, Toronto, ON M5B 1S1, Canada
- Coordinates: 43°39′28″N 79°22′52″W
- Client: Toronto Metropolitan University

Technical details
- Floor count: 8
- Floor area: 155,464 square feet (14,443.1 m^{2})

Design and construction
- Architecture firm: Zeidler Architecture Snøhetta
- Awards: LEED Gold

Other information
- Public transit: TMU

The Sheldon & Tracy Levy Student Learning Centre (SLC) is the main student centre at Toronto Metropolitan University. The building is home to several facilities and student services. Opened in 2015, it is located in downtown Toronto on the corner of Yonge Street and Gould Street.

== Background ==
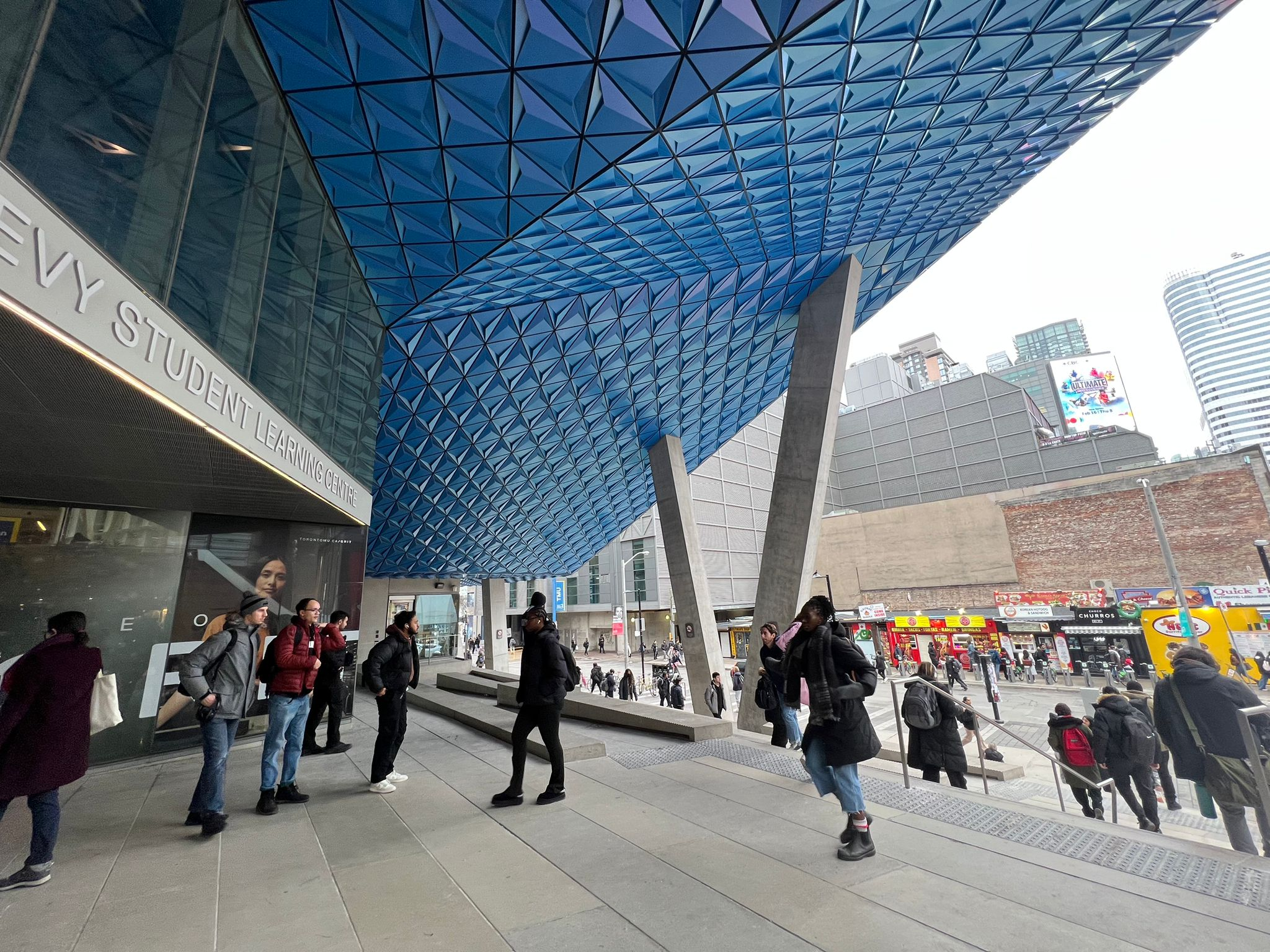
Toronto Metropolitan Universities Student Learning Centre Yonge street entrance populated in the winter

Two architectural firms were chosen to design the centre, these were New York architect Craig Dykers of Snøhetta architecture firm along with Zeidler Partnership Architects of Toronto, the project was given $45 million in funding from the government of Ontario with an overall budget of $112 million. TMU secured funding in 2008 and construction started on May 30, 2012, as community members and government officials gathered for a ceremony where TMU broke ground on the project. The building was completed in 2015 and first opened to students on September 1, 2015. The SLC is approximately 160,000 square feet and has a total of 8 floors including a rooftop terrace that is not accessible to the public. The university's president at the time of the projects conception was Sheldon Levy, and the project was initially inspired by the universities master plan, released in early 2008.

== Campus location ==
An important aspect of the TMU Student Learning Center is its presence and situation in downtown Toronto. The center is located at the northeast corner of Yonge and Gould Streets, which makes it an academic building in a commercial space. The building program required establishing an educational building with a presence on a commercial street known for its billboards and advertisements. By the students that occupy the building, the SLC proves to transform Toronto’s Sankofa Square into a hybrid civic and campus commons. The sidewalk folds up from the street, into a side staircase leading into the lobby. Further discussions are underway to link the SLC to TMU Station through an on-site subway entrance as the basement level is directly adjacent to the transit system.

In 2008, as part of a heritage preservation agreement for the construction of the Student Learning Centre on Yonge Street, Ryerson agreed to preserve the Sam the Record Man sign that had been located on the site. When the university later proposed to install smaller replica signs on Yonge Street instead, Levy and the university were criticized for attempting to change the original agreement. In 2017 the original sign was re-installed above 277 Victoria Street, steps from its original location.

== Building construction ==
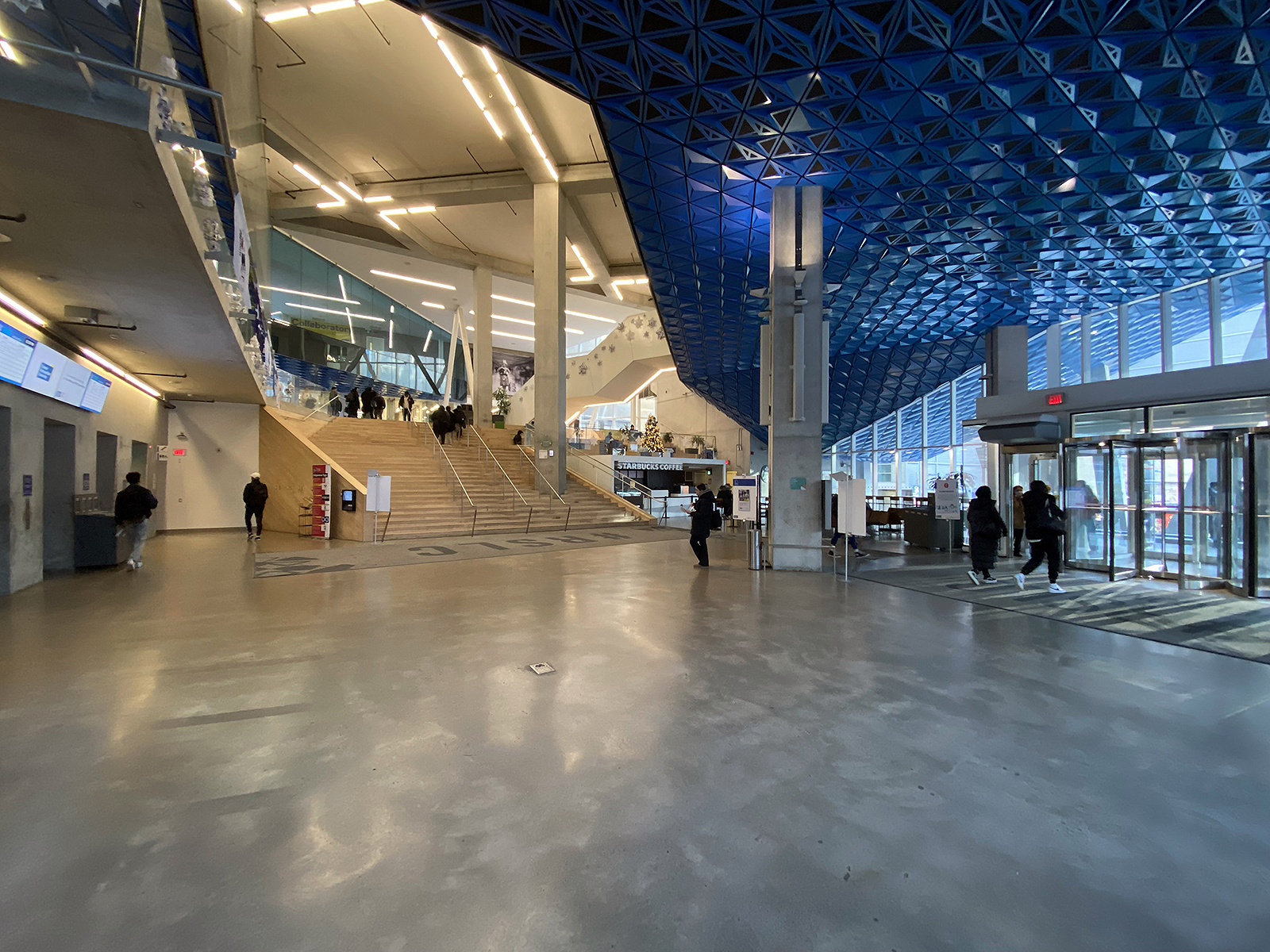
Lobby

The exterior of the building consists of two major components: fritted glass and concrete. The light-weight, transparent glass skin is fritted with intriguing patterns, which offers views into the building. The fritted pattern consists of etched geometric shapes that are positioned to frame specific views of the city. This pattern of rounded geometric shapes cut glare, while allowing natural light to penetrate through the etchings. By doing so, the facade acts to improve the shading coefficient and increase thermal comfort. In contrast to the delicate glass facade, the building features heavy exposed concrete at its point of entry. This distinct contrast announces the main entrance to the building. While the concrete structure is clearly rugged and massive, the glass skin is lightweight and transparent. Moreover, when considering the interior materiality of the building, several floors consist of colour-tinted glass that enclose study spaces. However, the rooms actually have normal white illumination when the lights are turned on. This is achieved by balancing the light levels on the interior and exterior of the rooms. Materiality varies between each of the floors in the building as the design also varies.

== Floors and building layout ==
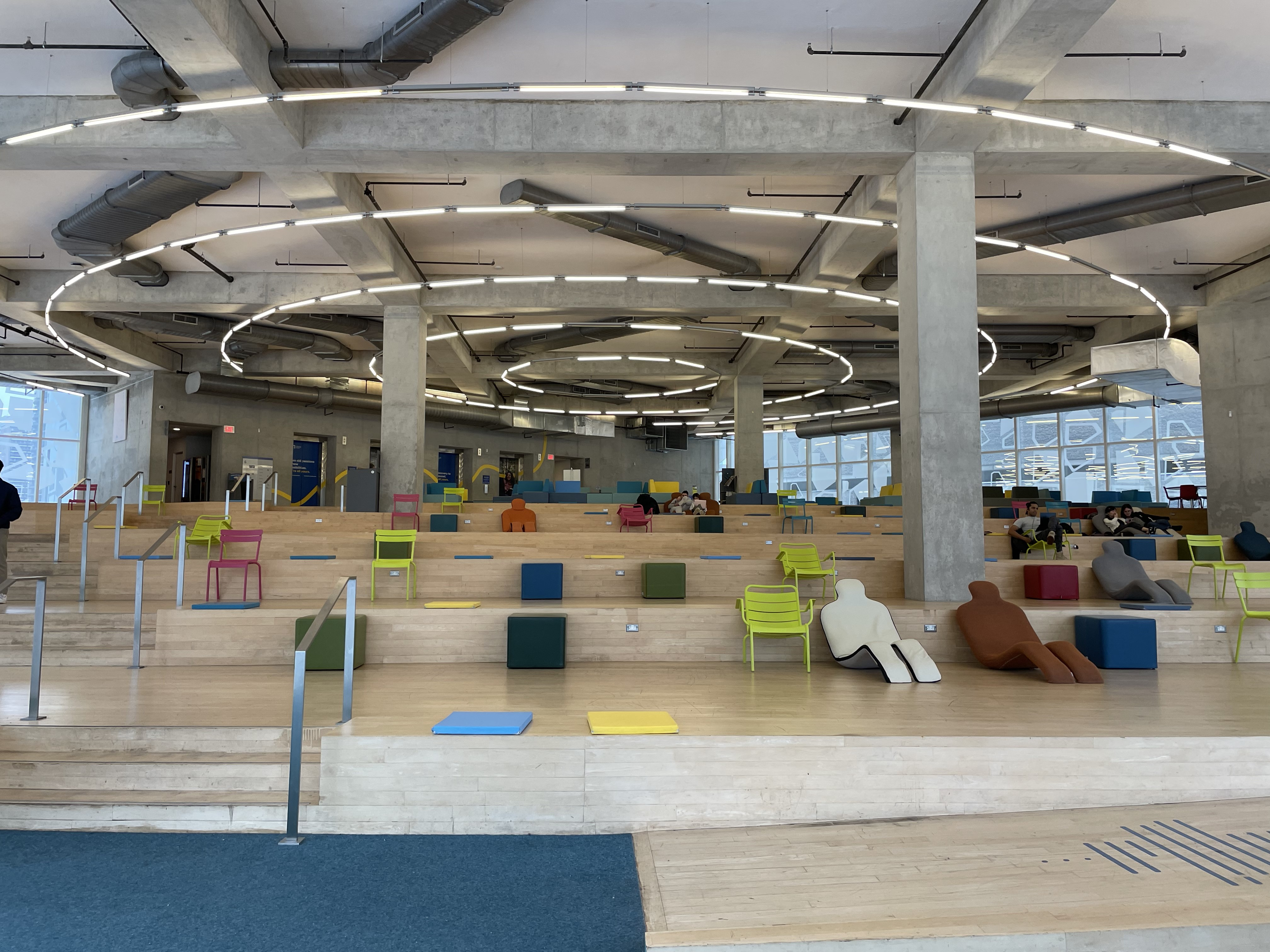
Floor 6 - The Beach - Toronto Metropolitan University Student Learning Centre.

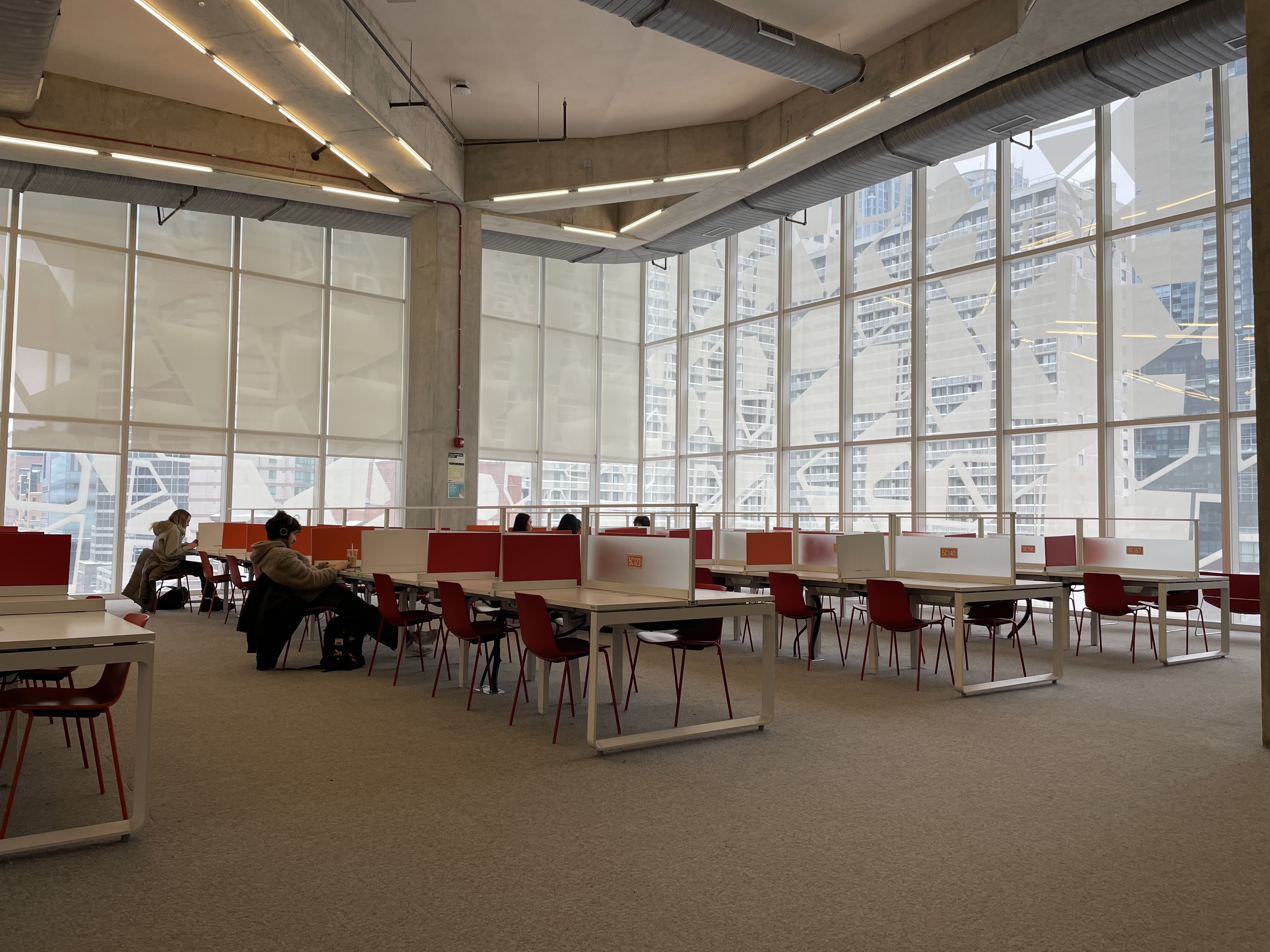
Seating on floor 5, The Sun, in Toronto Metropolitan University Student Learning Centre.

Each floor of the SLC has a distinctive characteristic that speaks to the concept of “familiar landscapes”. The lead architect teams of Ziedler and Snohetta chose to mimic landscapes in the environment that are quite self explanatory and familiar. Some levels are open and interpretive as per their design, whereas others are more individualized with enclosed study spaces. The template for the floors is relatively consistent, with large open reading rooms that sprawl alongside the large windowed facades. However, towards the middle of the floor are spaces geared towards studying and group work, whether that may be in an open area or enclosed. Architect Craig Dykers, principal of Snohetta, says “every floor is different, so you always find unique little spaces… you’re also confronted with a different need to navigate, so your mind is always having to work.” More on the “familiar landscapes” theme, each of the eight floors consists of a unique name and design, which is associated with a component in the natural landscape. Floor one is “The Valley”, which consists of an amphitheatre and a Starbucks. Floor two is “The Bridge” which encompasses the bridge leading to and from the library. Floor three is “The Bluffs”, which includes the D.M.Z Sandbox, and the TMU Library’s digital media experience lab. Floor four is “The Garden”, which includes student life & support, as well as academic accommodation support. Floor five is “The Sun”, which consists of collaborative group working rooms (CGWR), and seminar rooms. Floor six is “The Beach” which is intended for casual seating. Floor seven is “The Forest”, which is a quiet floor consisting of graduate and other study spaces. Last but not least, floor eight is “The Sky”, which consists of collaborative and individual study spaces.

== Facilities and student resources ==
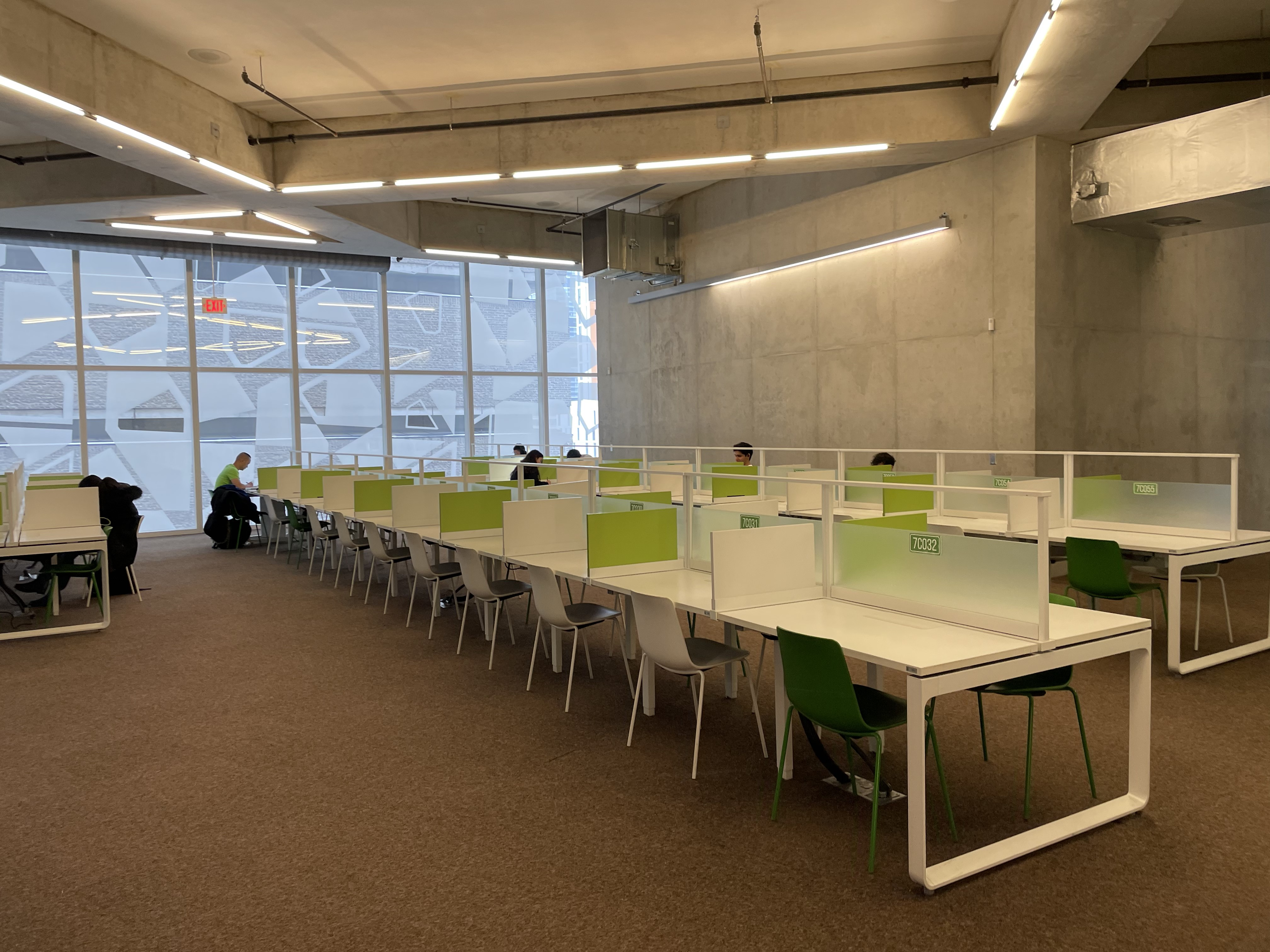
Quiet study rooms on floor 7, The Forest, in Toronto Metropolitan University Student Learning Centre.

Upon entering the building on the ground floor/first floor, also known as The Valley, an amphitheatre and Starbucks can be found. On the second floor, accessible from the first floor up a giant set of stairs, a student run booth can be found to help guild visitors. This booth contains maps of the centrer and TMU campus, as well as information about student resources and events. Off the second floor is also bridge access to the TMU library, an existing building with various resources and staff to help students. On floor three, The Bluffs, the DMZ Sandbox can be found, as well as a digital tech. lab with 3D printers called the Isaac Olowolafe Jr. Digital media experience lab. The fourth floor, The Garden, contains student life and support offices along with academic accommodation support for students with learning disabilities. On the fifth floor, The Sun, seminar rooms and desks up for reservation can be found, and on the sixth floor, The Beach, a casual seating area has been filled with beach chairs and bean bags. The seventh floor, The Forest, is known as a quiet floor and features graduate study spaces that are only accessible to graduate students, there are also desks for reservation on this floor and floor eighth, The Sky, which has collaborative and individual study spaces.

== Sustainability, LEED, passive design strategy ==
When the SLC was in its initial design stages, the architect's goal was to have the building reach LEED Silver. Once completed, they implemented various different design strategies to achieve this and when the building finished its construction, it was awarded LEED gold. The building features three green roofs, water conserving plumbing fixtures, roof and ground water collection systems that harvest storm water, concrete structure, mechanical features, automated lighting controls and a strategically designed glass facade.

The three green roofs are located on the top of the building, on a low sitting roof at the entrance of the building, and one on the roof of an attached bridge. The green roof located on the main roof of the building covers 50% of the surface.

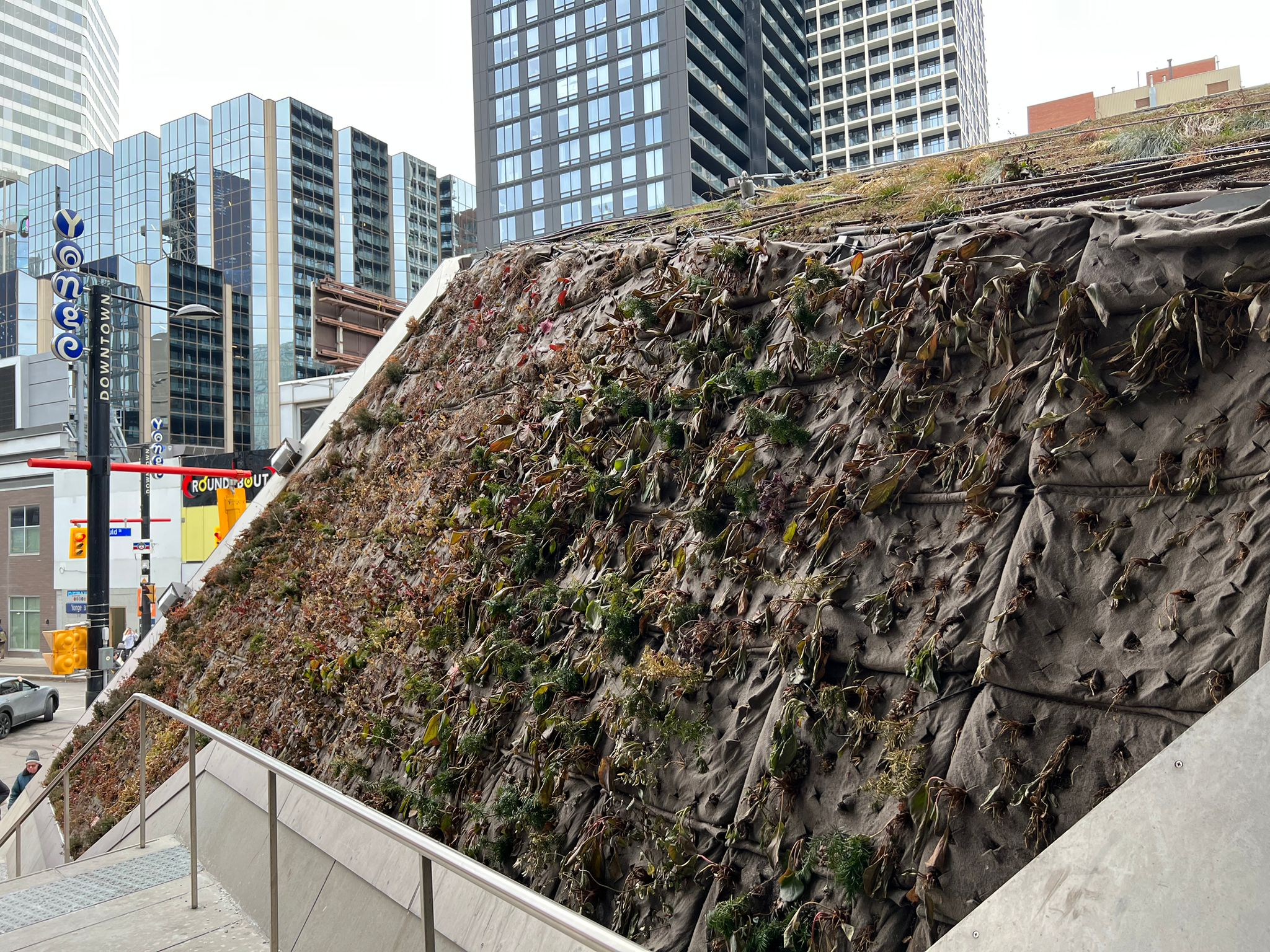
Toronto Metropolitan University Student Learning Centre main entrance green wall in winter

The SLCs roof and ground water collection systems as well as select plumbing fixtures help the building achieve LEED gold status. The building's storm water collection system stores water in concrete tanks located in the basement and are used throughout the building. Greywater from the building is used to irrigate the green roofs and is also used in urinals and water closets, the plumbing fixtures in the building were selected with the purpose of using the least amount of water possible.

The main material used in construction of the SLC is concrete, it was chosen because it provides good acoustic absorption and works well with the buildings in floor heating and cooling pipes. Concrete that can be seen on the inside of the building incorporates fly ash which helped the building achieve LEED gold.

The buildings mechanical features were chosen for their efficiency and sustainability, the central heating system distributes air using two condensing hot water boilers designed to operate at 94% efficiency and is based on a low temperature hot water heat distribution system. The cool water system the building runs off is supplied directly from the universities central plan, during the cooler months of the year outside air is brought into the building through air handlers to regulate temperatures. Outdoor air is constantly recirculating through the building and is measured by units that take readings of carbon dioxide from various zones in the building.

The glass façade of the SLC is lightweight and transparent, it is a design element that provides privacy and contributes to the sustainability of the overall building. The glass around the building is three-paned glass and is fritted with random geometric shapes that we specially designed for the project. The triple glazed glass and fritting reduces the weight of the material and lowers energy consumption, they also reduce glare and reflect heat which helps keep the building cooler during summer months.
