= Galleri Rom =

Architecture gallery in Oslo, Norway

Coordinates: 59.9198°N 10.7517°E

Galleri Rom is an architectural gallery in Oslo, Norway. The "room" for art and architecture is an independent center operated by private owners with support from the Royal Norwegian Ministry of Culture, and is located at Maridalsveien 3.

The gallery was founded in 1986 by the Norwegian architect Kjetil Trædal Thorsen.

It is the leading architectural gallery for Norwegian architecture, specializing in experimental architecture, visionary architecture, architecture which integrates socio-political approaches, and research in urban living, as well as architecture inspired by the theater, literature, stage, and other art media. Its objectives include:

- Providing a venue in which ideas and theory about space and the use of space can be explored pragmatically, with focus on both process and experimentation.
- Exploration of the intersection between architecture and art.
- A meeting place for creative people to communicate through exhibits, courses, lectures, debates and workshops.

Galleri Rom fosters art and architecture discussions across disciplines. They encourage research and experimentation in the design of space, use of decoration, and studies of public space. The work to enable dialogue among technical and artistic groups (architects, painters, artists, craftsmen, landscape architects and furniture designers) as well as the broader community.

Since 2005 Henrik der Minassian has served as the Chief Executive Officer for the room for art and architecture in Oslo. Under his direction the gallery has sponsored projects for researchers at both art and architecture colleges in Norway since 2005.
