= Craig Edward Dykers =

American architect

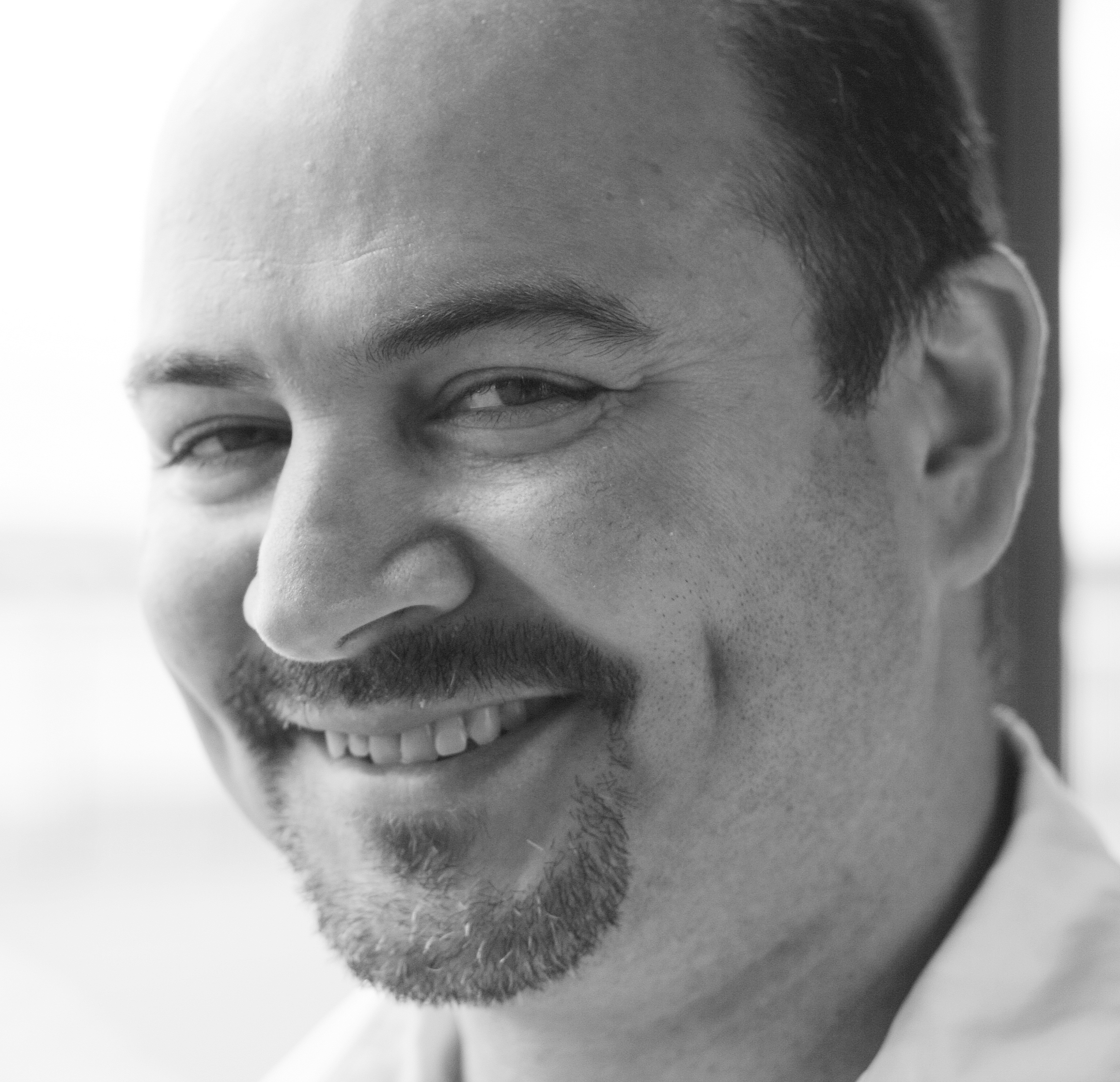
Craig Edward Dykers

Craig Edward Dykers is an American architect and co-founder of the architecture firm, Snøhetta.

== History ==
Craig Dykers was born in Frankfurt, Germany in 1961. In 1985 he graduated with a Bachelor of Architecture degree from the University of Texas at Austin.

== Projects ==
As one of the Founding Partners of Snøhetta, Dykers has led many of Snøhetta’s prominent projects internationally, including the Alexandria Library in Egypt, the Norwegian National Opera and Ballet in Oslo, Norway, the National September 11 Memorial Museum Pavilion in New York City, and the recently completed Sheldon & Tracy Levy Student Learning Centre in Toronto, Ontario, Canada. Dykers is currently leading the design of the San Francisco Museum of Modern Art Expansion in San Francisco, the new Times Square Reconstruction in New York City, both of which are currently under construction, as well as the Calgary Public Library, in Alberta, Canada.

Craig Dykers also designed Arch for Arch, a monument to Desmond Tutu located in Cape Town, South Africa.

== Awards ==
- Aga Khan Award for Architecture, 2004 Bibliotheca Alexandrina
- European Union Prize for Contemporary Architecture / Mies van der Rohe Award, 2009 Oslo Opera House
