= Kjetil Thorsen =

Norwegian architect

Kjetil Trædal Thorsen is a Norwegian architect. In 1987, he co-founded the architecture firm Snøhetta.

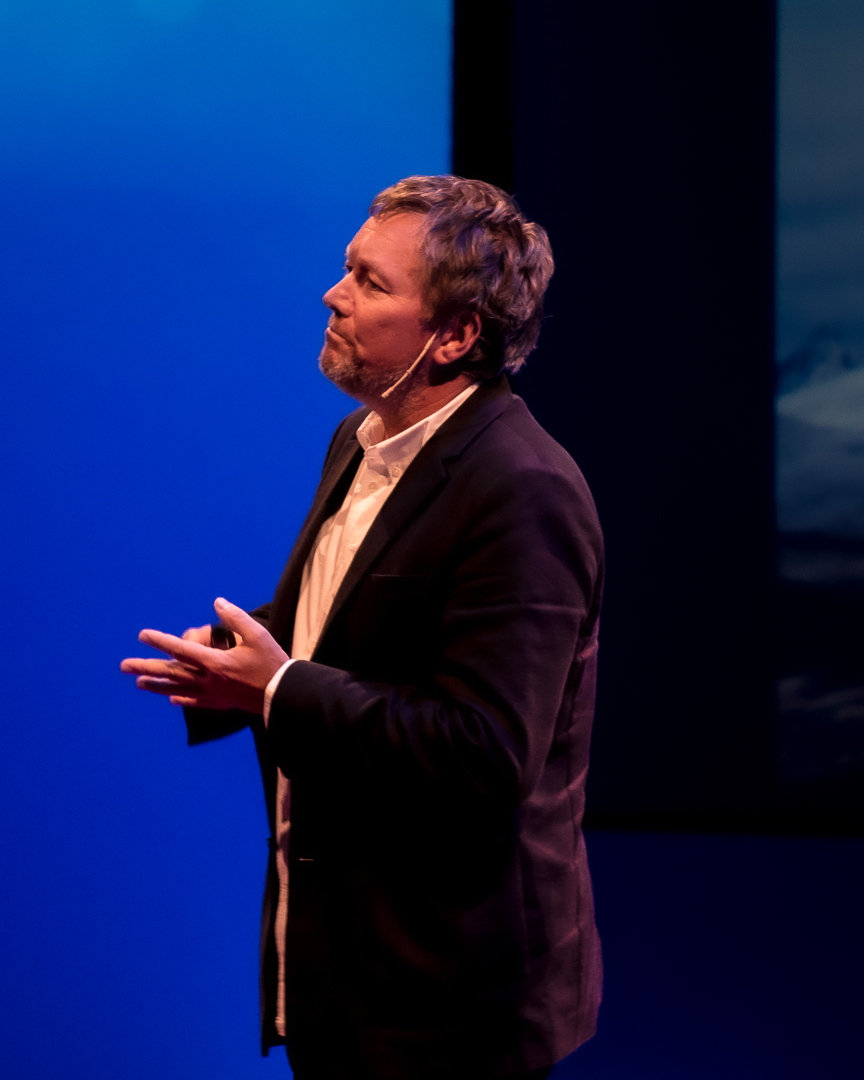
Kjetil Trædal Thorsen of Snøhetta at TEDxArendal, Norway, 2014

== History ==
Thorsen was born on 14 June 1958 on the Norwegian coastal island of Karmøy. After several years in Germany and England, he studied architecture in Graz, Austria. He had practiced at the office of Espen Tharaldsen (Arbeidsgruppen Hus) in Bergen (1982–1983), Ralph Erskine in Stockholm (1983–1984) and David Sandved in Haugesund (1985). In 1987, he formed an architectural practice in Oslo with a group of young architects. They named it Snøhetta after the tallest mountain in the Dovrefjell National Park.

== Designs ==
Thorsen led several award-winning design competitions for public buildings around the world. He led the Snøhetta teams designing the museum built for the Winter Olympics in Lillehammer, Norway, the 2007 Serpentine Gallery temporary Pavilion in London designed with Olafur Eliasson, the new Bibliotheca Alexandrina library in Alexandria, Egypt, and the new Oslo Opera House in Oslo, Norway. He was a founder of Norway's foremost architecture gallery, Galleri Rom in 1986.

== Associations ==
Thorsen had been a professor at the Institute for Experimental Studies in Architecture of the University of Innsbruck since 2004.He will Chair the Holcim Foundation Awards 2025 jury for region Europe.

== Decorations and honorary degrees ==
- 2008 Commander of the Royal Norwegian Order of St Olav
- 2010 Global Award for Sustainable Architecture
- 2011 Honorary doctor (dr.h.c.) of Norwegian University of Science and Technology (NTNU)
- 2013 Prince Eugen Medal for architecture

== Sources ==
- Anon (2014). "Honorary Doctors". NTNU (in Norwegian). Archived from the original on 2 January 2014.
