= Under (restaurant) =

Underwater restaurant in Lindesnes, Norway

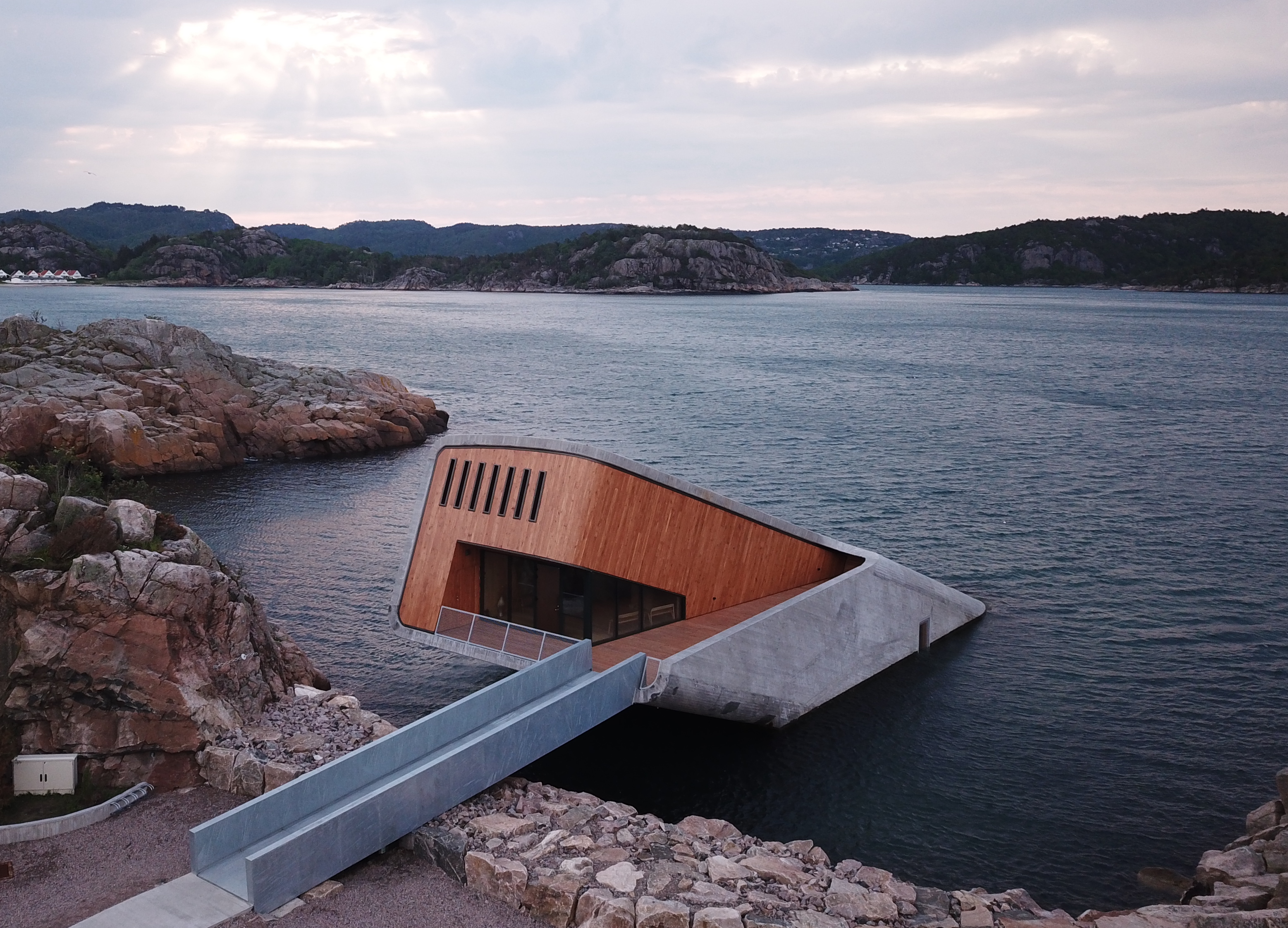
- The restaurant entrance
- Interactive map of the Under area
- Etymology: Norwegian for under and wonder

General information
- Type: Underwater restaurant
- Location: Bålyveien 50, Spangereid, Lindesnes, Norway
- Coordinates: 58.0409°N 7.1546°E
- Elevation: −5.5 m (−18 ft)
- Opened: 20 March 2019
- Cost: 70 million Norwegian kroner (€7 million)
- Owner: Stig & Gaute Ubostad (brothers)

Height
- Observatory: Underwater

Dimensions
- Diameter: 34 metres (112 ft)
- Other dimensions: The undersea panorama window is 11 by 3.4 metres

Technical details
- Size: 495 square metres (5,330 sq ft)

Design and construction
- Architecture firm: Snøhetta
- Developer: SubMar Group
- Awards: Betongtavlen 2019, DOGA Award for Design and Architecture
- Known for: World's largest undersea restaurant, first in Europe
- Company
- Type: AS
- Industry: Food service
- Founded: November 12, 2020; 5 years ago in Lindesnes, Norway
- Founders: Stig Ubostad
- Number of employees: 30 (2021)
- Website: https://under.no

References
- "Nøkkelopplysninger fra Enhetsregisteret". brreg.no (in Norwegian). Brønnøysundregistrene.

Under is an underwater restaurant in the village of Spangereid in Lindesnes Municipality, Norway. Its dining room is found 5.5 metres (18 ft) below sea level. The eating floor is 495 square metres (5,330 sq ft), making it the biggest underwater restaurant in the world, with a capacity of 40 people. It is the only underwater restaurant in Europe, and only the third to be found worldwide. Under also doubles as a sea lab, facilitating research in marine biology. The restaurant was designed by Norwegian architecture-firm Snøhetta.

The head chef is Danish Nicolai Ellitsgaard and the restaurant's culinary focus is to showcase the diversity of what the ocean and land has to offer from the southern part of Norway. The restaurant operates with a tasting menu consisting of around 18 to 22 dishes. The creations by Chef Ellitsgaard and his team was awarded with one star in the Michelin Guide after being open for less than one year.

== Background ==
The idea for the restaurant was created by entrepreneur-brothers Stig and Gaute Ubostad. The project became official in autumn 2016. The restaurant opened the 20th of March 2019. The total price for the project was 70 million Norwegian kroner, equal to 7 million Euros or around 8.5 million USD.

The project has received widespread media attention. The day of opening, 7.500 people had already booked a table. Journalists from over 30 countries were present.

"Under" in Norwegian carries a double meaning, meaning both below and wonder.

== Photos ==
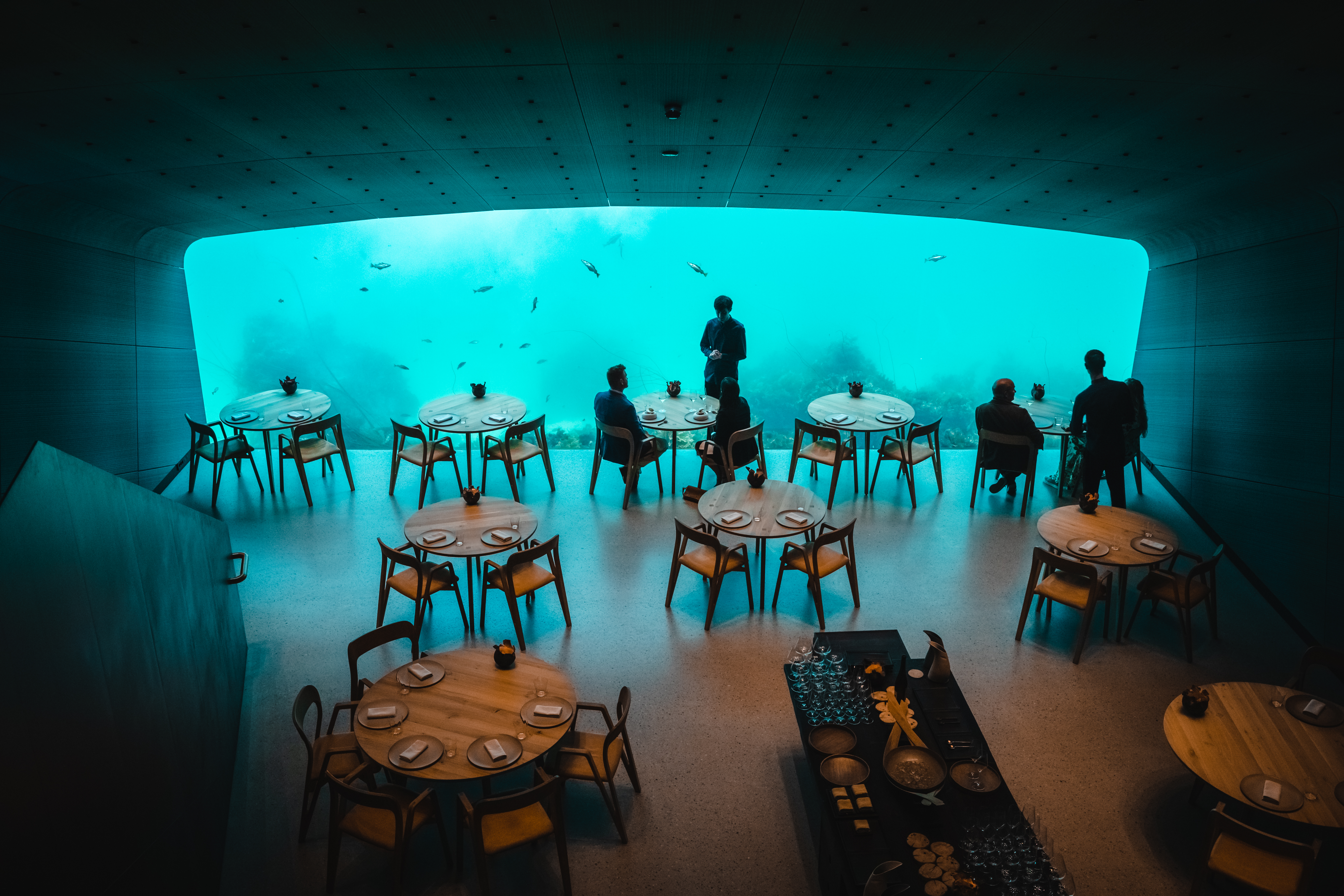
Underwater dining hall
