= Over–under (disambiguation) =

An over–under bet is a type of wager at a sportsbook.

Over–under, Over/under or Over and under may also refer to:

- Over/under cable coiling, a method of storing cables that preserves the capacitance and common-mode rejection ratio
- Over–under position, a stand-up grappling position in mixed martial arts
- Over and under shotgun, a double-barreled shotgun in which the two barrels are arranged vertically
- Over and Under, an album by folk musician Greg Brown, 2000
- Over and under, the possible alternatives for toilet paper orientation
- Over/Under, a series by the music publication website Pitchfork
