= Snøhetta (company) =

Architecture firm based in Oslo

Snøhetta AS
- Type: Private
- Industry: Architecture, Interior architecture, Landscape Architecture, Product Design, Art
- Founded: 1989; 37 years ago
- Founders: Kjetil Thorsen, Craig Edward Dykers
- Headquarters: Oslo, Norway
- Number of locations: Oslo, New York, Paris, Hong Kong, Shenzhen, Innsbruck, Melbourne,
- Number of employees: 350 (2024)
- Website: www.snohetta.com

Snøhetta AS (Norwegian pronunciation: [ˈsnø̀ːˌhɛtːɑ]) is a global architectural firm, founded in Oslo, Norway.

== History ==
In 1987, Kjetil Thorsen, Craig Dykers, and a group of young architects co-located in an office space in Storgata in Oslo. They were architects and landscape architects united in the idea that landscape architecture was a leftover discipline, only to be realized after most of the efforts and money had been spent on the construction of the building. Snøhetta’s strategy was to combine architecture and landscape architecture within a single concept.

Another important event had taken place that year: Former Norwegian Prime Minister Gro Harlem Brundtland’s UN report, “Our Common Future”, had just been released. To Snøhetta’s knowledge, it was the first time social, environmental, and economic sustainability had been formulated with such thoroughness and with such an impact on future policies. They saw a possibility to translate the content of this report directly into architectural designs of their physical surroundings.

They took the name Snøhetta arkitektur . landskap after the tallest mountain in the Dovrefjell National Park.

In 1989 the company entered the open and anonymous competition to design a reincarnation of the historic Library of Alexandria. Conceived as a revival of the ancient library in the city founded by Alexander the Great some 2300 years ago and lost to civilization centuries later, the design features a vast circular form alongside the Alexandrian harbor recalling the cyclical nature of knowledge. Its tilting roof recalls the ancient Alexandrian lighthouse.

The building’s facade also serves as a piece of art. It is a canvas of letters and symbols without a specific statement and an artistic celebration of the smallest element of the library's content, the letter. In addition to the library facilities, the building contains other cultural and educational functions including a planetarium, several museums, a school for information science, and conservation facilities. The new Bibliotheca Alexandrina was completed in 2001, and awarded the Aga Khan Award for Architecture in 2004.

Bibliotheca Alexandrina was later followed by the commission for the Norwegian National Opera and Ballet in Oslo, and the National September 11 Memorial Museum Pavilion at the World Trade Center in New York City, among many others.

Today, Snøhetta has a global presence, with studios in seven locations spanning from Oslo to Paris, Innsbruck, New York, Hong Kong, Shenzhen, and Melbourne.

== Disciplines ==
Since its inception, Snøhetta has maintained its original transdisciplinary approach, and often integrates a combination of architecture, landscape architecture, interior architecture, product design and art across its projects. The collaborative nature between Snøhetta's different disciplines is an essential driving force of the practice.

Today, Snøhetta delivers services within architecture, landscape architecture, interior architecture, product design and art.

Snøhetta also publish books under the name "Snøhetta Books".

== Culture ==
At Snøhetta, the individual is essential to the collective. Their philosophy, which emphasizes individual contributions within a collective framework, is often referred to as "Singular in the Plural."

Every other year, all Snøhetta studios gather in Norway for Dovre Conversations, a work retreat and team building exercise, taking place in the Dovre mountains. The goal is to strengthen cross-studio collaboration and inspire creativity. Together, architects, designers, administration, founders and leadership walk and talk to the top of the mountain.

Every year, Snøhetta employees can apply for cross-studio exchange, meaning they can work from one of the company's other studios.

== Climate change mitigation ==
Snøhetta recognizes the building industry’s significant environmental footprint and takes responsibility for minimizing its impact through thoughtful design choices. Their approach focus on the three core pillars of sustainability: environmental, social, and governance. From 2024, the company has reported according to the CSRD framework.

- Environmental Sustainability: Designing net-zero aligned buildings and landscapes that incorporate renewable energy, passive design strategies, and climate-resilient features such as flood resistance and heat mitigation. Emphasizing regenerative design and architecture to restore natural habitats and avoid biodiversity loss. Snøhetta aims to prioritize reuse of existing sites, using certified and local materials, and integrating biodiversity-enhancing features. They aim to design for longevity, adaptability, and reuse to reduce raw material consumption and waste.
- Social Sustainability: Snøhetta’s social impact extends from their own workforce to local communities and global value chains. The company has a human-centered design philosophy, promoting inclusivity, accessibility, and cultural sensitivity. Following their design ethos, they aim to design spaces that foster well-being, cultural expression, and community engagement through universal design, access to art and education, and strengthening cultural heritage and dialogue with First Nations and local communities. Snøhetta conducts due diligence in line with OECD guidelines to work to uphold human and labor rights, with an emphazis on health and safety, fair wages, labor exploitation, and social dumping. Within the seven studios, Snøhetta reports to create equitable and supportive work environments, with a strong focus on diversity and inclusion.
- Governance: Snøhetta is committed to ethical business practices, transparency, and integrity in all operations. Governance goals include upholding anti-corruption and anti-bribery standards, while fostering a corporate culture of fairness and accountability. Snøhetta’s implemented policies include Code of Conduct, Third Party Code of Conduct, Human Rights Policy, Diversity & Inclusion Policy and HSE Policy.

== Workers rights ==
Snøhetta is a global organization and recognize that frameworks and practices for unionization may vary from country to country. Although the belief in individual freedom to organize is a core value at Snøhetta, each studio has to operate within regional framework and legislation.

In Norway and many European countries it is an individual choice to unionize, while in certain American states, as is the case in New York, unionization is decided by a majority of the group of employees, meaning the majority determines the outcome by vote.

On July 7, 2023, after months of campaigning, a group of employees at Snøhetta's New York office where able to coordinate a vote on unionizing and joining Architectural Workers United (AWU) a division of the International Association of Machinists and Aerospace Workers (IAM). 29 votes where cast in favor of Unionizing, while 35 votes where cast in opposition. Prior to the vote several prominent Architectural firms had voted in favor of unionization, namely; SHoP, Bernheimer Architecture, and Sage and Coombe Architects, with the defeat of the vote at Snøhetta largely ending the trend. After the vote several employees filed a complaint to the National Labor Relations Board (NLRB) stating they were being discriminated against at work by management due to their support of Unionization, the lawsuit was defeated. Later in 2026 the IAM stated that Snøhetta has retained a prominent union busting law firm, even after the vote specifically to defeat discrimination lawsuits.

If the vote had been successful, it would have made Snøhetta the second private-sector firm in the United States to unionise, following Brooklyn-based Bernheimer Architecture, which unionised in the fall of 2022. However, as management at Bernheimer Architecture had agreed to the decision – making it unnecessary to hold a vote – Snøhetta was the first union to have a federally recognised vote in a private-sector architecture studio in over 50 years, according to AWU.

The vote included "all designers, architects, project leaders, and operations staff" and excluded management, partners, financial officers as well as executive assistants, accounting and human resource personnel, according to the NLRB, a standard breakdown in the process.

Whereas the US at the time of the election only had one private architectural firm with members in a union, Norway, where Snøhetta was founded, has the Norwegian Union of Architects (AFAG), which boasts 5,700 members. However, a spokesperson from the New York studio said in an interview with Dezeen that the Norwegian Union of Architects is "closer to the bar association than unions as we know them here". "For example, AFAG does not negotiate on behalf of employees nor does it play a role in their studio," said the spokesperson.

Furthermore, the spokesman stated that the US studio uses the same internal employee system as the Oslo studio, where employee representatives advocate for their interests and get a seat on the board.

On January 16, 2026, eight former employees of Snøhetta again filed to the NLRB stating they had been fired due to their support of the pro-Unionization campaign. This time the IAM has taken a more active role in the legal battles, accusing Snøhetta of "repressing the rights of their employees" and that there will be "consequences." Snøhetta denies the accusations, stating the firings where part of routine downsizing. Snøhetta then went on to release a statement that they support members of the firm joining unions in Norway, but not the United States, because "participation in unions in Norway does not require collective action."

“The signs of a workforce reduction, including projects going on hold and a general climate of economic uncertainty across the A&E and real estate industries, were evident at least 6 months earlier. However, once we became aware of the campaign, we held off on layoffs as long as possible to preserve the integrity of the election process.”

Furthermore, Snøhetta’s spokesperson said the terminations were not union-related: “Snøhetta has had three rounds of layoffs since 2023. In every instance, business considerations, such as projects going on hold and fewer new projects coming into the office, have led to workforce reductions, which we have strived to avoid.”

== Awards ==
Snøhetta has received the World Architecture Award for the Bibliotheca Alexandrina and the Oslo Opera House, and the Aga Khan Award for Architecture for the Bibliotheca Alexandrina. Since its completion in 2008, the Oslo Opera House has also been awarded the Mies van der Rohe Award, the EDRA (Environmental Design Research Association) Great Places Award, the European Prize for Urban Public Space, In 2010, through Kjetil Trædal Thorsen’s lead, Snøhetta’s works’ coherence with their environment was awarded the Global Award for Sustainable Architecture, both from an international point of view, for their large scale projects, and at a local, small projects scale.

== Other recognitions ==
In 2016, Snøhetta was named Wall Street Journal Magazine's Architecture Innovator of the Year, and the practice has been named one of the world’s most innovative companies by Fast Company two years in a row. In 2020, Snøhetta was awarded the National Design Award for Architecture, bestowed by Cooper Hewitt, Smithsonian Design Museum. In 2021 Snøhetta’s Forite tiles won the Sustainable Design of the Year by Dezeen and Best Domestic Design by Wallpaper* in 2022 and the wayfinding system for Le Monde Group Headquarters was acknowledged with Monocle Design Awards. In 2023, Snøhetta won a number of awards for the Esbjerg Maritime Center and was named Architects of the Year at the Monocle Design Awards, and was awarded Fast Company's "Innovation by Design" award for Asak Flyt. 2024 included a number of awards to Beijing Library and the BIA 2024 Award to Snøhetta and in 2025, Snøhetta was recognized with the OPAL Special Award for Sustainability, among others.

== Notable works ==
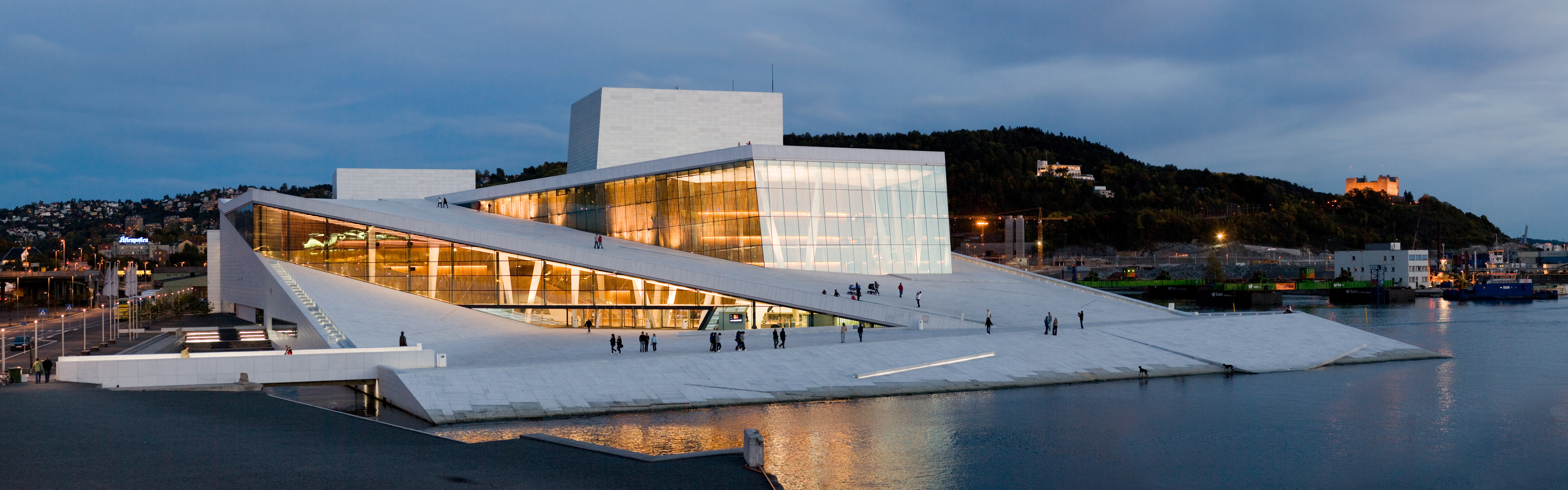
Oslo Opera House

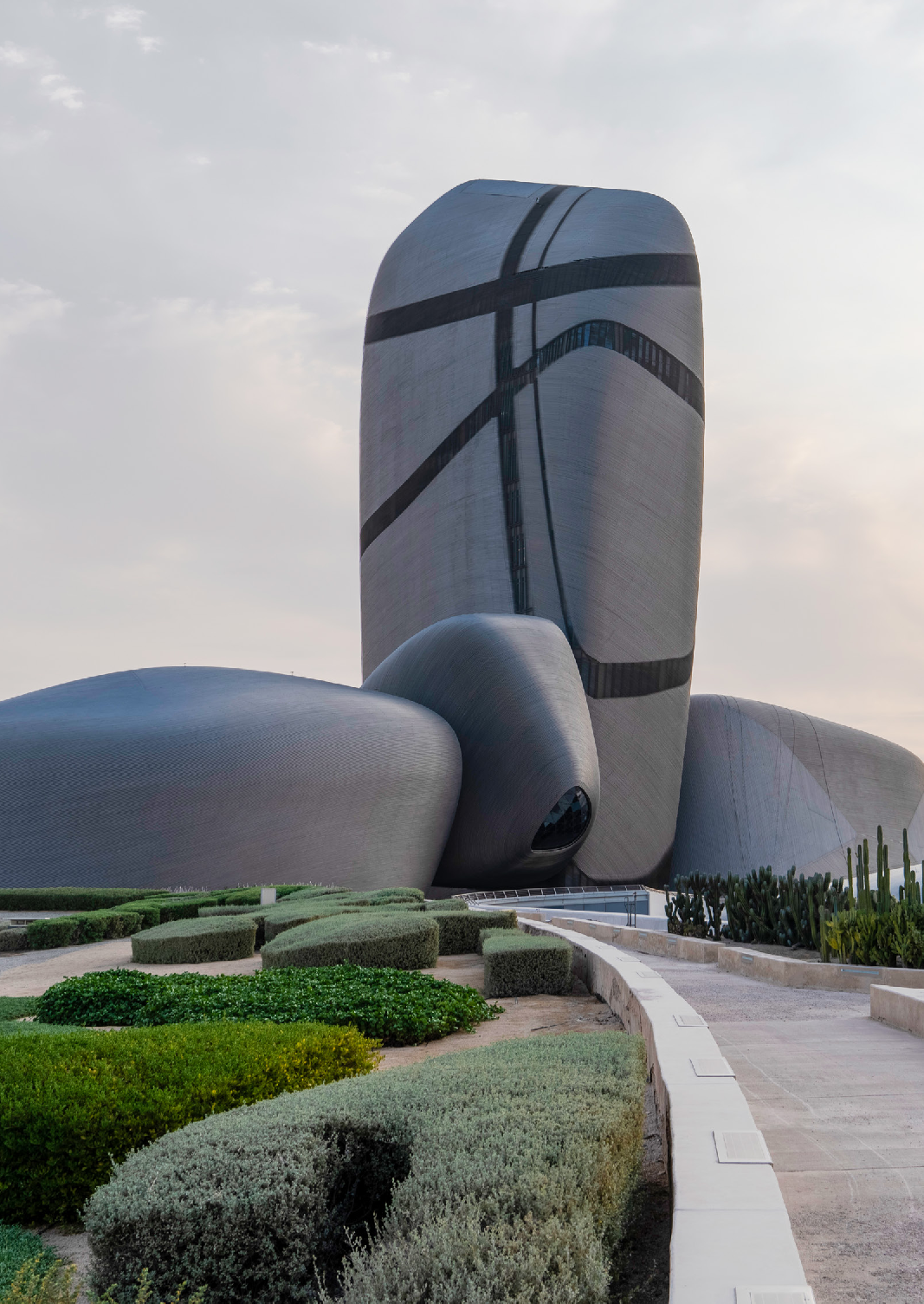
Ithra Center

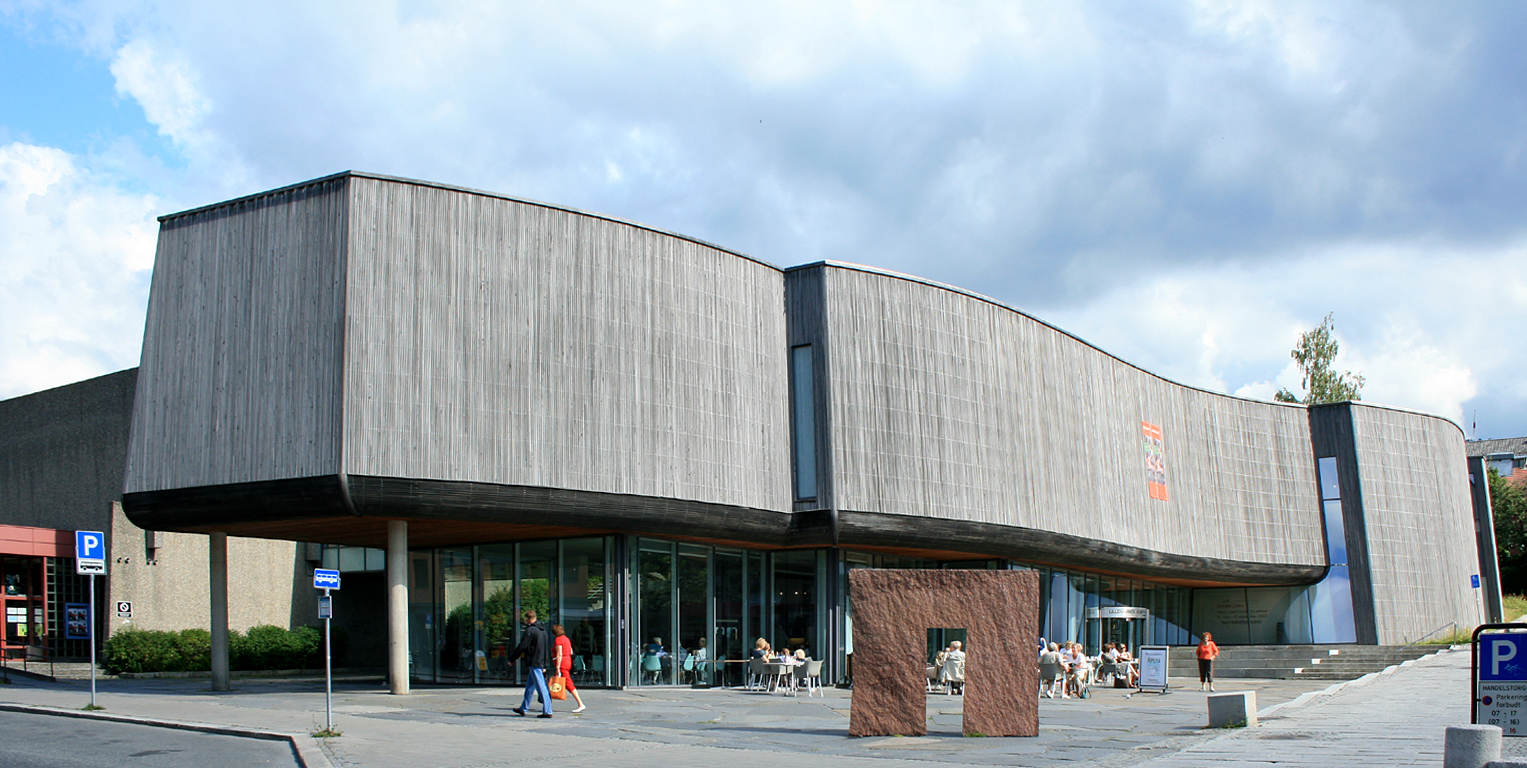
Lillehammer Art Museum

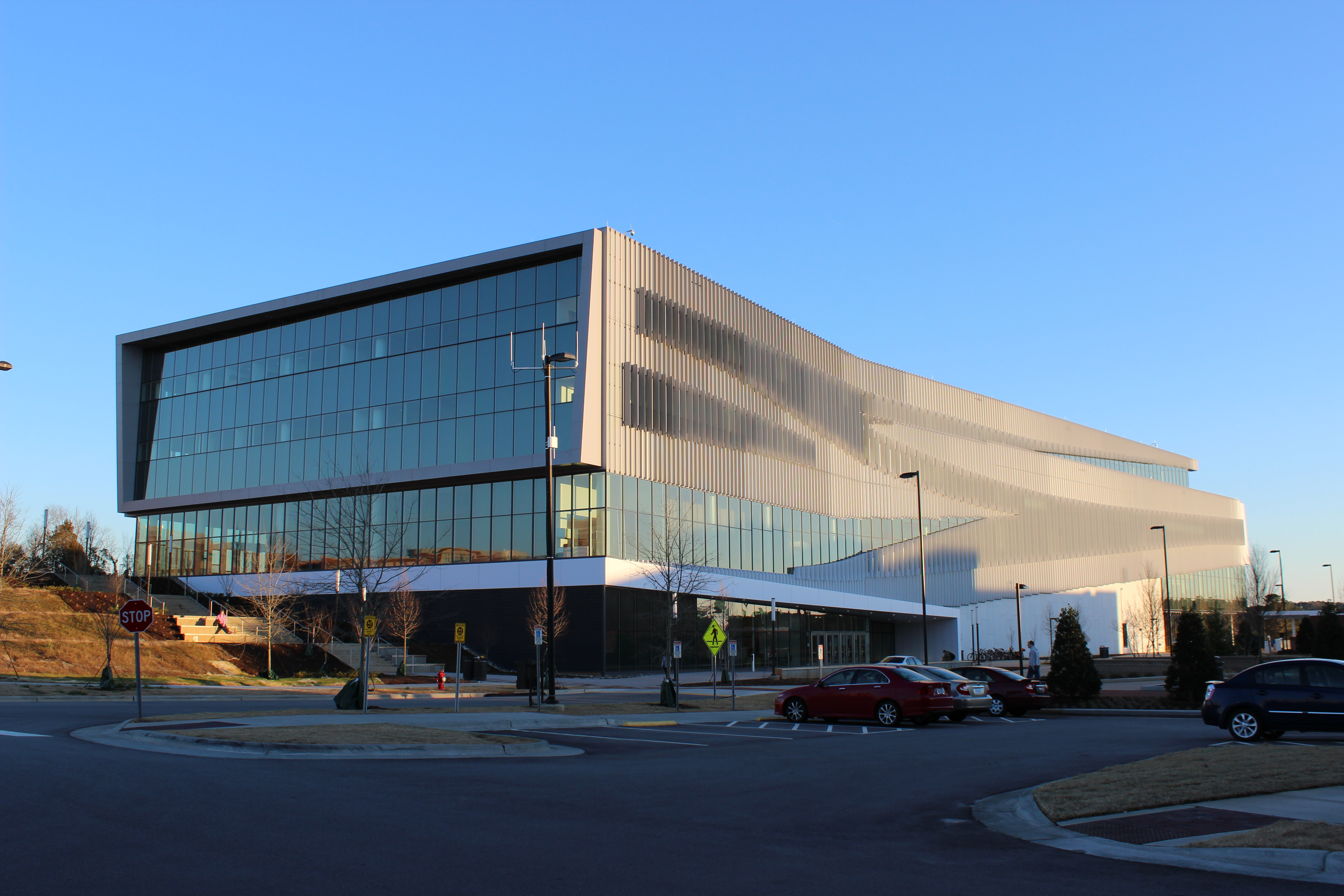
James B. Hunt Jr. Library, North Carolina State University

Groupe Le Monde headquarters, Paris

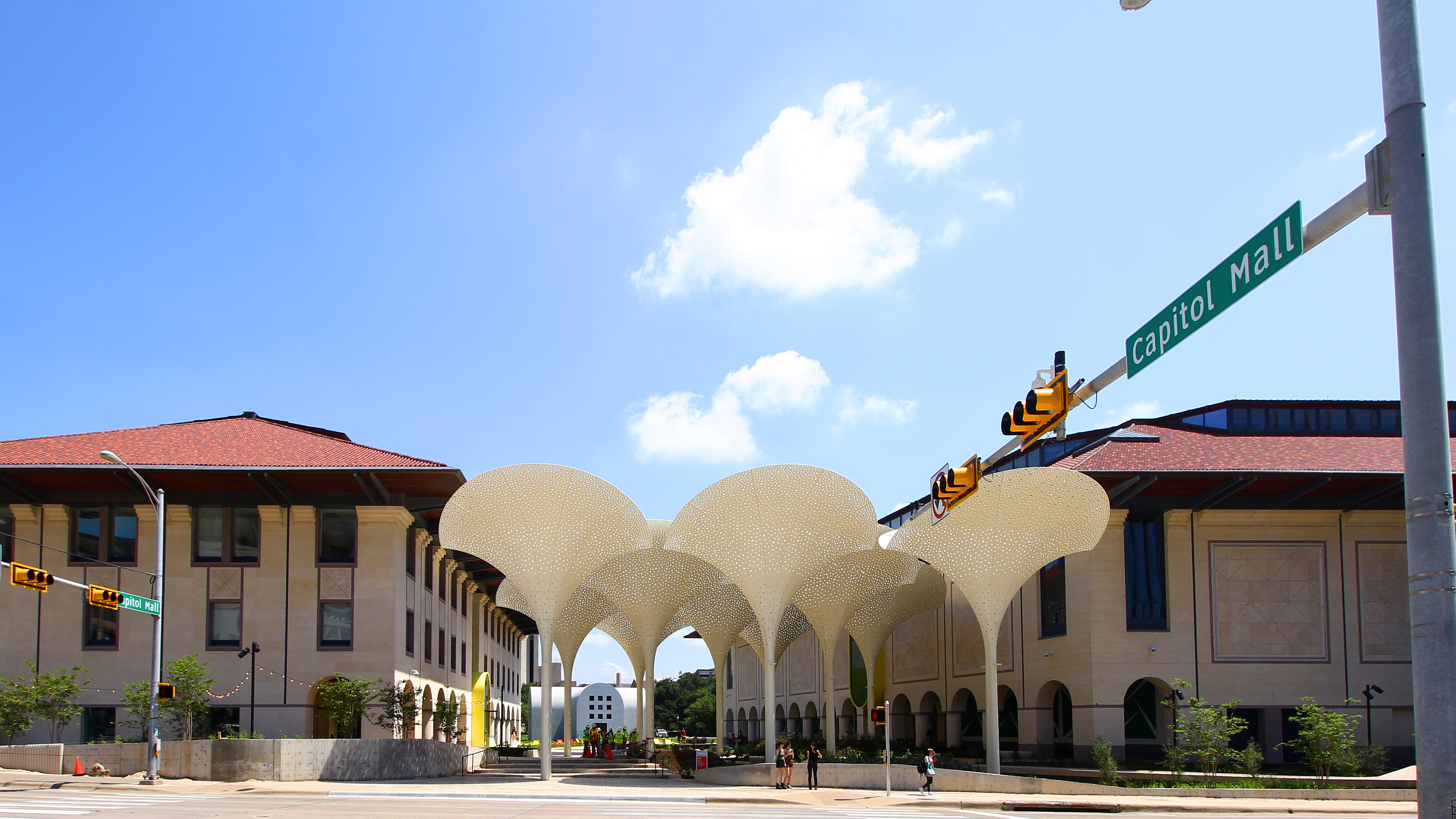
Blanton Museum of Art, Austin, Texas
- Bibliotheca Alexandrina, Alexandria, Egypt (2002)
- Wolfe Center for the Arts at Bowling Green State University in Bowling Green, Ohio (2012)
- National September 11 Museum, New York City (2014)
- Toronto Metropolitan University Student Learning Centre in Toronto (2015)
- King Abdulaziz Center for World Culture (Ithra), Dhahran (2016)
- Expansion of the San Francisco Museum of Modern Art (2016)
- Lascaux IV International Centre for Cave Art in Montignac, France (2016)
- Redesign and renovation of Times Square, New York (2017)
- Calgary Central Library, Alberta, Canada (2018)
- Under, underwater restaurant in Lindesnes Municipality, Norway (2019)
- Shanghai Nanjing Road East Extension, Shanghai, China (2020)
- Blanton Museum of Art (2023)
- Joslyn Art Museum, Omaha, Nebraska (2024)
- Museum of Sex, Miami, Florida (2024)
- Qasr Al Hokm Metro Station, Riyadh, Saudi Arabia (2024)
- Beijing Library, Beijing, China (2024)
- Ford World Headquarters, Dearborn, Michigan, U.S. (2025)
- Dartmouth Hopkins Center for the Arts, New Hampshire, USA (2025)
- Theodore Roosevelt Presidential Library, near Medora, North Dakota U.S. (expected completion date in 2026)
