= List of Canadian magazines =

This is a list of magazines published in Canada.

Title	Debut	End	Language	Frequency	Subject/genre	Ownership	Former titles
Discorder Magazine	1983			Bi-Monthly	Art, Music, Culture		
24 images	1979		French	Monthly	Cinema of Quebec		
Above&Beyond	1988		English	Bi-monthly	Northern-related lifestyle and news		
L'Action nationale	1917		French	Monthly	Quebec local interest		
L'actualité	1976		French	20 per year	News	Rogers Media	Le Maclean
Adbusters	1989		English	Bi-monthly	Political and cultural activism	Adbusters Media Foundation	
Advisor's Edge	1998		English	Bi-monthly	Financial advice	Transcontinental	
Alberta Report	1973	2003	English	Weekly	News and politics		St. John's Edmonton Report
Algoma Ink	1996		English	Annually	Literature	Algoma University	
Alive Magazine	1974		English	Monthly	Lifestyle (health and wellness)	Teldon Publishing	
Atlantic Business Magazine			English	Bi-monthly	Business		
Atlantic Insight	1979	1990	English	Monthly	General interest		
Auto Atlantic	2002		English	Bi-monthly	Automotive	Robert Alfers	
BC Report	1989	2003	English		News		
The Body Politic	1971	1987	English	Monthly	LGBT	Pink Triangle Press	
Brave Words & Bloody Knuckles	1994		English	Ten per year	Heavy metal music		
Briarpatch	1973		English	Bi-monthly	Alternative news		Notes from the Briarpatch
Brick	1977		English	Biannually	Literature		
Broken Pencil	1995		English	Quarterly	Arts and culture		
Canada World View	1998	2006		Quarterly	Foreign policy	Department of Foreign Affairs and International Trade	
Canada's History	1920		English	Bi-monthly	History	Canada's National History Society	The Beaver
The Canadian	1965	1979	English	weekly	general interest, newspaper supplement	Southam Inc.	
Canadian Art	1943	2021		Quarterly	Art	Canadian Art Foundation	Maritime Art; artscanada
Canadian Business	1928		English	Bi-weekly	Business	Rogers Media	The Commerce of the Nation
Canadian Dimension	1963		English	Quarterly	Politics		
Canadian Forum	1920	2000		Quarterly	Politics, literature, culture		
Canadian Geographic	1930		English	Bi-monthly	Geography, science	Royal Canadian Geographical Society	Canadian Geographic Journal
Canadian Home & Country	1987	2009	English	Eight per year	Lifestyle	Transcontinental Media	
Canadian Immigrant	2004		English	Monthly	Culture		
Canadian Literature	1959		English and French	Quarterly	Literature	University of British Columbia	
Canadian Living	1975		English	Monthly	Women's lifestyle	TVA Publications	
Canadian Parliamentary Review	1978		English and French	Quarterly	Government, politics	Canadian members of the Commonwealth Parliamentary Association	Canadian Regional Review
Canadian Yachting	1976		English	Bi-monthly	recreational Boating Lifestyle	CY Media	
Cannabis Culture	1995		English		Cannabis		
ChartAttack	1991	2009	English	Ten per year	Music	andPOP	National Chart; Chart
Chatelaine	1928		English	Quarterly	Women's lifestyle	Rogers Media	
Checkerspot	2007	2009		Bi-annual	Environmental (climate change)	Canadian Wildlife Federation	
Chickadee	1979			Monthly	Children's	Bayard Presse	
CineAction	1985		English	Three times per year	Film		
Ciné-Bulles	1980		French	Quarterly	Cinema of Quebec	Association des cinémas parallèles du Québec	
Cinema Canada	1972	1989	English	10 - 12 issues a year	Cinema of Canada		
Cinema Scope	1999	2024	English	Quarterly	Cinema and film		
Cinema Sewer	1997	2021	English	Biannually or annually	Cinema and film		
Cité Libre	1950	2000	English and French		Politics		
Contemporary Verse 2	1975		English	Quarterly	Literature		
Corporate Knights	2002			Quarterly	Business		
Country Music News	1980	2012		Monthly	Country music		
Criteria: A Critical Review of the Arts	1974	1978	English	Irregular	Feminist art criticism		
The Dalhousie Review	1921			Triannually	Literature	Dalhousie University	
Cult MTL	2012		English	Monthly	Alternative		
Dadgar	2013		Persian, English	Monthly	Legal issues		
Dogs in Canada	1899	2012	English	Monthly	Dogs	Apex Publishing Ltd (Canadian Kennel Club)	
The Dorchester Review	2011		English	Quarterly	History and culture		
Downhome				Monthly	Lifestyle		The Downhomer
Driven	2004			Six times a year	Men's lifestyle		The Downhomer
Drug Facts for Young People			English	Annual	Drug Awareness	Regional Maple Leaf Communications	
Elementary Safety Book For Children			English	Annual	Kid's Safety	Regional Maple Leaf Communications	
Esprit de Corps	1988		English	Monthly	Military		
Exclaim!	1991		English	Monthly	Music		
explore	1981		English	Quarterly	Outdoors	Explore Outdoor Media Inc.	Explore Alberta
Every Day Fiction	2007			Daily	Literature		
fps	1991	1999	English		Animation		Quark
fab	1994	2013		Biweekly	LGBT culture, news	Pink Triangle Press	
Fashion	1977		English	Monthly	Fashion	St. Joseph Media	
Faze	2000		English	Quarterly	Youth-oriented		
The Fiddlehead	1945			Quarterly	Literature	University of New Brunswick	
Flare	1979		English	Monthly	Fashion	Rogers Media	
Frank	1987			Biweekly	Satire, gossip		
Fugues	1984		French	Monthly	LGBT	Editions Nitram	
Fuse	1976	2014	English	Monthly	Arts and culture	Artons Cultural Affairs Society and Publishing	Centerfold
TheGATE.ca	November 2000				Entertainment		
GayCalgary					LGBT		
Geez	2006			Quarterly	Spirituality, politics	Geez Press, Inc.	
Geist	1990		English	Quarterly	Literature	The Geist Foundation	
Géographica	1997		French		Geography, science	Royal Canadian Geographical Society	
Glow	2002		English	Eight per year	Health and beauty	St. Joseph Media	
Golden Words	1967			Weekly	Humor	Queen's Engineering Society	
Graffiti	1984	1986			Music		
Harrowsmith	1976		English		Rural and city living	Moongate Publishing	Harrowsmith
HighGrader	1995				Rural lifestyle and culture		
The Hockey News	1947		English	Weekly	Sports	Transcontinental Media	
Homemakers	1966	2011	English	Nine per year	Women's, lifestyle	Transcontinental Media	
Hunter and Cook	2008			Three per year	Art and culture		
The Idler	1985	1993	English	Irregular; monthly in theory	Literary		
Inuktitut	1959		Inuktitut (syllabics), Inuinnaqtun, English, French	Quarterly	Inuit culture	Indian and Northern Affairs Canada	
KidsWorld	1993		English	Bi-monthly	Children's	MIR Communications, Inc.	Kids World Magazine
Justice Magazine	1949	1972	English	Weekly	True crime		Justice Weekly
Literary Review of Canada	1991			Ten per year	Literary		
LOU LOU	2004		English, French	Eight per year	Women's		
Maandblad de Krant	1959		Dutch, West Frisian	Eleven per year	Dutch immigrant community	Mokeham Publishing Inc.	De Hollandse Krant
Maclean's	1905		English	Monthly	News	Rogers Media	The Business Magazine
The Magazine	1993		English	Monthly	Youth	Community Programs Group	New Jr. Jays Magazine; The Magazine — Not for Adults
Maisonneuve	2002		English	Quarterly	General interest		
The Malahat Review	1967		English	Quarterly	Literary		
Mehfil Magazine	1993		English	Six per year	South Asian lifestyle		
Memewar	2006			Irregular	Alternative, arts		
MoneySense	1999			Eight per year	Business, financial	Rogers Media	
Les Mouches fantastiques	1918	1920	English	irregular	LGBT arts and politics	Elsa Gidlow and Roswell George Mills	Coal from Hades
Music Express	1976	1996	English	Monthly	Music, entertainment	Rock Express Communications	
Muskrat Magazine	2010		English		Indigenous arts and culture		
Naked Eye	1999	2010	English		Entertainment and lifestyle		
Natural Life	1976				Environment, lifestyle	Life Media	
Neo-opsis Science Fiction Magazine	2003				Science fiction		
The New Quarterly	1981		English	Quarterly	Canadian literature	The New Quarterly Literary Society Inc.	
Newfoundland Quarterly	1901		English		Literary, culture and history	Memorial University of Newfoundland	
The Nerve	1999	2007	English	Six per year	Music		
Nightlife	1999		English and French	Monthly	Lifestyle, culture, arts	NEWAD	
Northern Ontario Business					Local business	Laurentian Media Group	
On Spec	1989		English	Quarterly	Science fiction, fantasy, speculative fiction	The Copper Pig Writers Society	
Ontario Out of Doors	1967				Hunting, fishing	Ontario Federation of Anglers and Hunters	
Opera Canada	1960		English	Quarterly	Opera	Opera Canada Publications	
Ottawa Business Journal	1995			Biweekly	Regional business	Great River Media	
Outdoor Canada	1972		English	Six per year	Angling and hunting	Cottage Life Media	
Outlooks	1997			Ten per year	LGBT culture, news	Mint Media Group	
Owl	1976		English	Ten per year	Children's	Bayard Canada	
Peace Magazine	1985			Quarterly	Politics, world affairs	Canadian Disarmament Information Service	
Photosho	2007		English		Photography	Light Leaks Press	
Playback	1986	2010			Film, broadcasting, media	Brunico Communications	
Plenitude	2012		English	Biannual	LGBT literature	Andrea Routley	
Popjournalism	2004			Quarterly	Entertainment		
Pound	1999			Quarterly	Hip-hop music, lifestyle		
Prairie Fire	1978			Quarterly	Literature	Prairie Fire Press	Writers News Manitoba
Quill & Quire	1935		English	Monthly	Publishing industry	St. Joseph Media	
Rites	1984	1992	English	10/year, later 6/year	LGBT, Politics	Rites Publishing, non-profit collective	
Room			English		Literature		
RPM			English				
Rue Morgue	1997		English		horror in culture and entertainment	Rodrigo Gudiño	
Review of Journalism	1984		English		personalities and issues in journalism	Toronto Metropolitan University School of Journalism	
Saskatchewan History			English				
Saturday Night	1887	2005	English				
SAY	2002		English	Bi-monthly	Contemporary Indigenous Lifestyle	Spirit of Aboriginal Youth	
Scoregolf			English				
Séquences			English				
See Magazine	1992	2011	English	Weekly			
Shameless			English				
Sharp	2008		English	Bi-monthly	Men's	Contempo Media Inc.	
Shift	1992	2003	English	Monthly, later bi-monthly	Technology, culture		
Sir John Magazine			English				
Siren	1995	2004	English	Bimonthly	Lesbian culture, news in Toronto		
Spacing	2003		English	Quarterly	Urban affairs	Spacing Media	
Sportsnet Magazine	2011	2016	English	Bi-weekly	Sports	Rogers Media	
Stitches: The Journal of Medical Humour			English				
Straight Goods			English				
Strategy	1989				Advertising	Brunico Communications	
Style at Home	1996		English	Monthly	Lifestyle	Transcontinental Media	
Swerve	1994	2007	English		LGBT culture, news in Winnipeg		
Take One			English				
Tamarack Review			English				
This Magazine	1966		English	Bi-monthly	political, arts and cultural writing from a progressive perspective	Red Maple Foundation	This Magazine Is About Schools
The Marketer	2020		English	Virtual	marketing, arts, & entrepreneurship		
TISH			English				
Toro	2003	2007	English		Men's Interests	Black Angus Media	
Toronto Life	1966		English	Monthly	Arts, culture and entertainment in Toronto	St. Joseph Media	
Tribe			English				
Tribute	1980		English				
TV Guide	1977	2006	English	Weekly	Listings magazine	Transcontinental Media	
Up Here	1984		English				
Uppercase	2009		English	Quarterly	Arts, culture, alternative	Uppercase	
Urban Male Magazine			English				
Vancouver Magazine			English				
Vice 160							
The Walrus	2003		English	Eight per year	Canadian and international affairs	The Walrus Foundation	
Wasted Youth			English				
Wayves			English		LGBT culture, news in Halifax		
Weddingbells			English	Bi-Annual			
The Western Producer			English				
Western Standard			English				
What If?			English				
Xtra!	1984			Fortnightly	LGBT culture, news in Toronto	Pink Triangle Press	
Xtra Ottawa	1993			Three weeks	LGBT culture, news in Ottawa	Pink Triangle Press	Capital Xtra!
Xtra Vancouver	1993			Bi-weekly	LGBT culture, news in Vancouver	Pink Triangle Press	Xtra! West
