= Royal Canadian Mounted Police Foundation =

Canadian foundation

- Mounted Police Foundation
- Established: June 1994; 32 years ago
- Type: Non-profit organization based in Canada
- Legal status: Active
- Headquarters: Ottawa, Ontario, Canada
- Region served: Canada
- Official language: English, French
- Website: www.rcmp-f.ca

The Royal Canadian Mounted Police Foundation or RCMP Foundation (formally the Mounted Police Foundation) is an independent, arm's-length, self-funded, registered charitable organization that supports community programs across Canada. The Foundation invests in and delivers programs that complement the Royal Canadian Mounted Police's (RCMP) work in the community, through programs that divert youth away from dangerous and criminal activities. The Foundation does not fund RCMP detachments or members, nor does it fund core policing functions.

== History ==
The foundation was established in 1994 as a charitable organization.

In 2007 the RCMP Foundation took over the on-site retail facilities of the RCMP canteens, rebranding the stores as The Mountie Shop; net profits from the Shop contribute to the foundation.

As of 2011, the RCMP Foundation has contributed more than $10.5 million to support some 1,000 community groups initiatives across the country.

== Licensing program ==
Funds generated by the program include its royalties from the licensing program. As the master licensor for the Royal Canadian Mounted Police, the Foundation manages the commercial use of the RCMP name, image and trademarks. In exchange for royalty payments, the Foundation allows companies to produce and market "official" RCMP merchandise.

In June 1999, the Foundation partnered with Regional Maple Leaf Communications under the licensing program to lend their endorsement to The Elementary Safety Book For Children, Drug Facts For Young People and the Teenage Survival Handbook. The three RMC publications are available free of charge to communities across Canada. RMC's fourth publication Green Planet for Kids and all four accompanying websites were included in the endorsement as of April 1, 2013.
