= Digby Courier =

Canadian weekly newspaper in Nova Scotia

- Type: Weekly newspaper
- Format: Broadsheet
- Founded: 1874
- Ceased publication: January 28, 2016
- Website: www.digbycourier.ca

The Digby Courier was a weekly community newspaper published in Digby, Nova Scotia.

== History ==
Established in 1874 by R.S. McCormick, it served Digby County and was owned by TC Transcontinental. In January 2016, it was merged with two other weekly newspapers, the Yarmouth Vanguard and the Shelburne Coast Guard, to form the Tri-County Vanguard. The last issue of the Digby Courier was published on January 28, 2016.
