= Shelburne Coast Guard =

Canadian newspaper in Nova Scotia

- Type: Weekly newspaper
- Format: Broadsheet
- Founded: 1896; 130 years ago
- Ceased publication: January 26, 2016; 10 years ago

The Shelburne Coast Guard was a weekly community newspaper published in Shelburne, Nova Scotia. Established in 1896 by Moses H. Nickerson, it served Shelburne County. The newspaper was owned by TC Transcontinental. In January 2016, it was merged with two other weekly newspapers, the Yarmouth Vanguard and the Digby Courier, to form the Tri-County Vanguard. The last issue of the Shelburne Coast Guard was published on January 26, 2016.
