= Debra Anderson =

Canadian writer

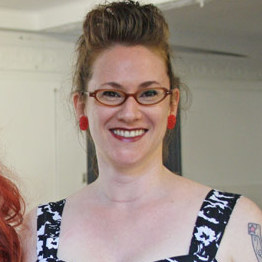
- Debra Anderson
- Occupation: Writer
- Writing career
- Period: 2000s–present
- Notable work: Code White
- Notable awards: 2009 Dayne Ogilvie Prize
- Website: debraanderson.ca

Debra Anderson is a Canadian writer, who won the 2009 Dayne Ogilvie Prize from the Writers' Trust of Canada for an emerging lesbian, gay, bisexual or transgender writer.

A graduate of the creative writing program at York University, her publications to date include the novel Code White (2005) and the play Withholding. Her work has also been anthologized in Bent on Writing: Contemporary Queer Tales (2002), Brazen Femme: Queering Femininity (2002), Geeks, Misfits and Outlaws (2003) and Persistence: All Ways Butch and Femme (2011). Her writing has also been published by periodicals including Fireweed, Xtra!, The Church-Wellesley Review, Tessera, Shameless, periwinkle, Zygote, Acta Victoriana, Hook & Ladder, dig and Siren.

While at York University, she won the institution's George Ryga Award, a prize for the best play written by a student in the university's playwrighting courses. She has also written and released a short animated film, Don't Touch Me, which premiered at the Inside Out Film and Video Festival in 1998.

Anderson is also the organizer of Get Your Lit Out, a reading series in Toronto that promotes local women writers.
