= Yarmouth Vanguard =

Nova Scotian newspaper

- Type: Weekly newspaper
- Format: Broadsheet
- Founded: October 5, 1966
- Ceased publication: January 26, 2016
- Website: www.thevanguard.ca

The Yarmouth Vanguard was a weekly community newspaper published in Yarmouth, Nova Scotia. Established in 1966, it served Yarmouth County and was owned by TC Transcontinental. It was rebranded from the Yarmouth Vanguard to the Yarmouth County Vanguard. In January 2016, it was merged with two other weekly newspapers, the Digby Courier and the Shelburne Coast Guard, to form the Tri-County Vanguard. The last issue of the Yarmouth County Vanguard was published on January 26, 2016.
