= Dimakos =

Dimakos (Greek: Δημάκος) is a Greek surname. Notable people with the surname include:

- Dini Dimakos, Canadian comedian
- Eleonora Dimakos, Canadian model, actress, journalist, and makeup artist
- Germanos Dimakos (1912–2004), Greek Eastern Orthodox priest and Greek Resistance member
- Ioannis Dimakos (born 1990), Greek basketball player
