= What If =

What If may refer to:

== Film ==
- What If, a 2006 TV film starring Niall Buggy
- What If... (2010 film), an American film
- What If... (2012 film), a Greek film
- What If (2013 film) or The F Word, a Canadian-Irish film
- Yun Hota Toh Kya Hota, or What If...?, a 2006 Indian film

== Television ==
- What/If, a 2019 American thriller streaming miniseries
- What If... (web series), a 2010 American soap-opera crossover series
- What If...? (TV series), a 2021 American animated series by Marvel Studios
- What If (Hong Kong television series), a 2025 Hong Kong television series by ViuTV and Milkyway Image
- "What If..." (Agents of S.H.I.E.L.D.), a 2017 episode
- "What If" (Doctors), a 2004 episode
- "What If" (Drop Dead Diva), a 2009 episode
- "What If?" (JAG), a 2004 episode

== Literature ==
- Alternate history, fiction based on what if historical questions
- Alternate universe (fan fiction), fiction based on what if questions in fiction
- "What If—", a fantasy short story by Isaac Asimov
- What If? (book), an xkcd blog and associated book by Randall Munroe
  - What If? 2 (book), the sequel to the first book.
- What If (comics), comic book series featuring alternate versions of the Marvel Comics universe
- What If? (essays), an anthology of counterfactual history essays
- What If? (magazine), a Canadian arts and literature youth magazine
- What If...?: Amazing Stories selected by Monica Hughes, a book by Monica Hughes

== Music ==
=== Albums ===
- What If (Dixie Dregs album) or the title song, 1978
- What If? (Emerson Drive album) or the title song, 2004
- What If (Jerry Douglas album) or the title song, 2017
- What If? (Kenny Barron album) or the title song, 1986
- What If... (Mr. Big album), 2011
- What If (Tommy Shaw album) or the title song, 1985
- What If..., by Burns Blue, 2003

=== Songs ===
- "What If" (112 song), 2005
- "What If" (Ashley Tisdale song), 2009
- "What If" (Babyface song), 2001
- "What If" (Colbie Caillat song), 2011
- "What If" (Creed song), 1999
- "What If" (Dina Garipova song), 2013
- "What If" (Friends song), featuring Darin, 2009
- "What If" (Jason Derulo song), 2010
- "What If" (Kate Winslet song), 2001
- "What If" (Reba McEntire song), 1997
- "What If", by Aaliyah from Aaliyah, 2001
- "What If", from the musical The Addams Family, 2009
- "What If", by Adrienne Bailon from The Cheetah Girls: One World soundtrack album, 2008
- "What If?", by AJ McLean from Have It All, 2010
- "What If", by Armin van Buuren from Imagine, 2008
- "What If", by Blanca, 2018
- "What If", by Cog from Sharing Space, 2008
- "What If", by Coldplay from X&Y, 2005
- "What If...?", by Control Denied from The Fragile Art of Existence, 1999
- "What If", by Craig David from Following My Intuition, 2016
- "What If", by Emilie Autumn from Enchant, 2003
- "What If", by Esmée Denters from Outta Here, 2009
- "What If", by Five for Fighting from Bookmarks, 2013
- "What If?", by Godsmack from The Oracle, 2010
- "What If?", from the musical If/Then
- "What If", by J. Cole and Morray from The Fall-Off, 2026
- "What If...", by J-Hope from Jack in the Box, 2022
- "What If", by Johnny Orlando and Mackenzie Ziegler, 2018
- "What If", by Kevin Gates from By Any Means 2, 2017
- "What If", by King Missile from King Missile, 1994
- "What If", by Nicole Nordemann from Brave, 2005
- "What If", by PureNRG from PureNRG, 2007
- "What If", by Ruben Studdard from Soulful, 2003
- "What If", by Simple Plan from Simple Plan, 2008

== Other uses ==
- What-if analysis, or sensitivity analysis, the study of how model output varies with changes in input
- What if chart, a visual tool for modeling the outcome of a combination of different factors
- WHAT IF software, a molecular modeling and visualization package
- Life Is Strange (video game) (working title What If), a 2015 episodic adventure game

== See also ==
- Alternate history
- Counterfactual history
- If (disambiguation)
- Hypothetical question
- Uchronia
- What (disambiguation)
