= Canadian Ice Fishing Championship =

Fishing tournament on Lake Simcoe

The Canadian Ice Fishing Championship is a two-day annual event held on Lake Simcoe, in Ontario, Canada. It was created in 1994, two years after the World Ice Fishing Championship was held in Georgina, Ontario. The "Catch - Photograph - Release" ice fishing tournament attracts anglers, mainly from Canada and the US, but sometimes from other countries, who bring their ice fishing skills to this large, shallow lake. The first day is 'Big Fish Day', when anglers fish the deep water to try to catch the biggest fish. Scrutineers measure the length and width of each fish caught, and points are awarded for the fish each team submits to the judges. The second day is 'Perch Day', when anglers try to catch the heaviest and most perch. Perch caught are weighed in, and returned to the lake.

== Media ==
Outdoor Canada magazine ran several articles on the Canadian Ice Fishing Championship. The event gained international attention with interviews conducted by Fairchild TV. In 2012 The Canadian Ice Fishing Championship received particular attention from the media because of difficulties encountered by its organizer, Lures & Tours, when for the most part the ice failed to form in what was deemed as 'the year without a winter'. Radio Programs such as Ripple Outdoors covered the Canadian Ice Fishing Championship too. The Canadian Ice Fishing Championship was also included in the Ontario Ministry of Natural Resources survey of 2012 Competitive fishing events in Ontario.
