= Canadian Home Workshop =

Canadian magazine (1977–2014)

- Editor: Douglas Thomson
- Categories: DIY, Woodworking
- Frequency: Six issues a year
- Publisher: Cottage Life Media Inc.
- First issue: 1977
- Final issue: Winter 2014 (print)
- Country: Canada
- Based in: Toronto
- Language: English
- Website: canadianhomeworkshop.com
- ISSN: 1485-8509

Canadian Home Workshop was a Canadian magazine that had been published since 1977. Its last publication was the Winter 2014 issue. The magazine featured do-it-yourself and woodworking content. The headquarters was in Toronto. Its previous headquarters was in Markham, Ontario.

Published six issues a year, it featured articles on project ideas, tool profiles, technique and design ideas, practical renovation and home maintenance information, and shop tips. The magazine was formerly published on a monthly basis.

The magazine was owned by Avid Media until 2004 when Transcontinental acquired the title. Then the magazine was sold in September 2009 (along with sister title Outdoor Canada magazine) to Cottage Life Media Inc.

Canadian Home Workshop had been Canada's authority on home improvement and woodworking for the last 33 years. The magazine provided its readers with a mix of classic and contemporary woodworking projects, including information for beginners that would develop their skills and more advanced techniques to challenge and inspire.
