= Sir John (disambiguation) =

Sir John is primarily a nickname for Ghanaian lawyer and politician Kwadwo Owusu Afriyie.

Sir John may also refer to:

- Sir John (horse), a 19th-century racehorse
- Sir John (magazine), a Canadian online magazine
- "Sir John", a song by Don Patterson on the album Opus De Don
- Sir John (make-up artist), an American make-up artist
- Sir John, a fictional villain played by Raza Murad in the 1989 Indian film Ram Lakhan
