= Wasted Youth =

Wasted Youth may refer to:

- Wasted Youth (American band), a 1980s hardcore punk band
- Wasted Youth (British band), a 1980s goth post-punk band
- Wasted Youth (film), a 2011 Greek film
- Wasted Youth (magazine), a Canadian teen punk rock magazine
- Wasted Youth (For the Fallen Dreams album)
- Wasted Youth (Girl album)
- "Wasted Youth", a 1993 spoken-word piece performed by Jim Steinman on Bat Out of Hell II: Back into Hell

== See also ==
- Wasted on Youth, an album by English post-punk band the Molotovs (2026)
