= Private member's bill =

Legislation not proposed by the executive

A private member's bill is a bill (proposed law) introduced into a legislature by a legislator who is not acting on behalf of the executive branch. The designation "private member's bill" is used in most Westminster system jurisdictions, in which a "private member" is any member of parliament (MP) who is not a member of the cabinet (executive). Other labels may be used for the concept in other parliamentary systems; for example, the label member's bill is used in the Scottish Parliament and the New Zealand Parliament, the term private senator's bill is used in the Australian Senate, and the term public bill is used in the Senate of Canada. In legislatures where the executive does not have the right of initiative, such as the United States Congress, the concept does not arise since bills are always introduced by legislators (or sometimes by popular initiative).

In the Westminster system, most bills are "government bills" introduced by the executive, with private members' bills the exception; however, some time is set aside in the schedule for reading such bills. They may be introduced by non-ministerial MPs from government-supporting parties (backbenchers), by members of opposition parties (frontbencher or backbencher), or by independents or crossbenchers. The Israeli Knesset has a long history of enacting private members' bills: a slight majority of the laws passed by it originated as private members' bills, and thousands more are introduced without being passed. In contrast, the Oireachtas (parliament) of the Republic of Ireland rarely passes private members' bills, with the overwhelming number of bills being passed being introduced by members of the cabinet.

A private member's bill is not to be confused with a private bill, which is a bill that only affects an individual citizen or group.

== Comparative tables ==
Numbers of private member's bills introduced and passed in various legislatures
Legislature	Period	Across the period			Yearly average		
Legislature	Period	Number introduced	Number passed	Proportion of private members' bills passed	Number introduced	Number passed	Proportion of private members' bills passed
Parliament of Australia	2000-2018	241	13	5.39%	13	0.7	5.38%
Austrian Parliament	2000-2017	1599	483	30.21%	94	28	29.79%
Belgian Federal Parliament	1999-2018	7831	588	7.51%	588	31	5.27%
Parliament of the Czech Republic	1998-2018	1185	368	31.05%	59	18	30.51%
Folketing (Denmark)	1999-2018	250	36	14.40%	13	2	15.38%
National Assembly (Hungary)	2000-2018	2863	641	22.39%	159	35	22.01%
Oireachtas (Ireland)	2000-2018	855	29	3.39%	48	1.6	3.33%
Knesset (Israel)	1999-2018	26393	1018	3.86%	1389	56	4.03%
Italian Parliament	2001-2017	18578	171	0.92%	1161	11	0.95%
Chamber of Deputies (Luxembourg)	1999-2018	155	39	25.16%	8	2	25%
Parliament of New Zealand	2000-2018	249	77	30.92%	13	4	30.77%
Parliament of Poland	2001-2018	2675	913	34.13%	157	54	34.39%
Assembly of the Republic (Portugal)	2000-2018	4661	1105	23.71%	259	61	23.55%
National Council of Slovakia	1999-2018	2680	462	17.24%	141	24	17.02%
Slovenian Parliament	2000-2018	726	157	21.63%	40	9	22.5%
Parliament of the United Kingdom	2000-2017	1561	86	5.51%	92	5	5.43%

Numbers and proportions of laws originating in private member's bills passed by various legislatures
Legislature	Period	Total number of laws passed	Number of private members' bills passed	Proportion of laws which originated in private members' bills
Parliament of Australia	2000-2018	3025	13	0.43%
Austrian Parliament	2000-2017	2264	483	21.33%
Belgian Federal Parliament	1999-2018	6100	588	9.64%
Parliament of the Czech Republic	1998-2018	2085	368	17.65%
Folketing (Denmark)	1999-2018	835	36	4.31%
National Assembly (Hungary)	2000-2018	3139	641	20.42%
Oireachtas (Ireland)	2000-2018	821	29	3.53%
Knesset (Israel)	1999-2018	2831	1018	35.96%
Chamber of Deputies (Luxembourg)	1999-2018	1966	39	1.98%
Parliament of New Zealand	2000-2018	532	77	14.47%
Assembly of the Republic (Portugal)	2000-2018	1610	1105	68.63%
National Council of Slovakia	1999-2018	2439	462	18.94%
Slovenian Parliament	2000-2018	2496	157	6.29%
Parliament of the United Kingdom	2000-2017	677	86	12.70%

== Private member's bill by region ==
=== Australia ===
In Australia, a draft bill is prepared by the parliamentary counsel, acting under instructions from the MP. After community consultation, the member introduces the bill into the Parliament.

Only 30 private members' bills or private senators' bills introduced into the Australian Parliament since 1901 have been passed into law. Of these, thirteen have been initiated by senators, ten by members and seven by the speaker and Senate president. A larger number have passed one house but not the other. An even larger number did not pass the house in which they were introduced and thus lapsed at the dissolution of each parliament following the announcement of a federal election.

Among the most notable of the successful bills was the Commonwealth Electoral Bill 1924, which amended the Commonwealth Electoral Act 1918 to introduce compulsory voting for federal elections. This was introduced by Senator for Tasmania Herbert Payne of the Nationalist Party on 16 July 1924, passed by the Senate on 23 July, passed by the House of Representatives on 24 July – both times with little debate – and given royal assent on 31 July. Despite much public debate ever since on the issue of compulsory voting, the legislation has never been repealed.

Another very notable private member's bill was the Euthanasia Laws Bill 1996, which deprived the Northern Territory, Australian Capital Territory and Norfolk Island legislatures of the power to make laws permitting euthanasia. This was introduced by Kevin Andrews, Member for Menzies, after the Northern Territory Legislative Assembly had passed such a law, the Rights of the Terminally Ill Act 1995. Although Andrews was a member of the Liberal Party, members and senators were allowed a conscience vote on the issue, and each side of the debate was supported by members and senators from all political parties. These laws prohibiting assisted dying were later repealed by the Restoring Territory Rights Bill 2022, this too was a private member's bill, however this was introduced by Labor MPs.

A private member's bill, the Marriage Amendment (Definition and Religious Freedoms) Act 2017, legalised same-sex marriage throughout Australia on 9 December 2017. It was introduced by Dean Smith, Senator for Western Australia following the "Yes" result in the postal survey.

Notable also was the private member's bill introduced in 2000 by Alan Corbett in the New South Wales Legislative Council to amend the Crimes Act 1900. The first successfully enacted (or indeed introduced) bill in over 100 years to address the protection of children from abuse and excessive physical chastisement. It received very wide support from New South Wales organisations related to child health and welfare and was backed by several prominent members of the medical profession, particularly in the paediatric field, notably John Yu, CEO of Royal Alexandra Hospital for Children, Sydney (who had been honoured by the Australian Government with the prestigious Australian of the Year award in 1996). Its initial aims were to limit physical chastisement by banning the use of implements (belts, sticks, hairbrushes, etc.), ban the use of force above the shoulders (thus preventing neck, head, brain and facial injuries), and require that any physical force applied leave only trivial and short-lived signs such as redness (that is, no bruising, swelling, welts, cuts, grazes, internal injuries, emotional trauma, etc.); with the exception of the clause banning the use of implements (which was dropped to gain essential support from the state Labor Government for the bill), it was passed intact and became law in 2001.

Notably, in New South Wales the Sydney MP Alex Greenwich has had three successful private members' bills, those being the Abortion Law Reform Act 2019, the Voluntary Assisted Dying Act 2021, and the Equality Legislation Amendment (LGBTIQA+) Bill 2023.

=== Canada ===
In Canada, a private member's bill (French: projet de loi émanant d'un député) is a bill introduced in the House of Commons by a member of parliament who is neither a cabinet minister nor a parliamentary secretary. A private member's bill follows the same legislative process as a government bill, but the time allocated for its consideration is restricted. Private members' bills may be considered only during one of the daily Private Members' Hours. Under rules established in 1986, 20 items of private members' business are selected at random to receive priority in debate. Six of these items are chosen by a committee to be votable and must come to a vote in the House. Prior to the 1986 rules, private members' bills and motions could be "talked out", meaning that all the time allocated to private members' bills could be used up introducing or debating bills without them ever being voted on, as each bill must be voted on after the second hour of debate. (The ramifications of the 1986 rules were discussed in the Canadian Parliamentary Review, 1988, Vol 11, No. 3.) Even under the new rules, very few private members' bills become law, but passage is more likely in minority government situations. The vast majority of private members' bills that actually do become law are for the purpose of changing the name of the riding represented by the MP introducing the bill.

When an election is called, all bills that have not been passed die on the order paper (that is, they are removed from the agenda of Parliament, and must be re-introduced in the new session of Parliament after an election). In the House of Commons (but not in the Senate), private members' bills remain on the order paper when Parliament is prorogued.

Notable private members bills have been the following:

==== Passed ====
In the 98 years from 4 May 1910 to 7 September 2008, 229 private members' bills passed.

===== Before the 1986 rules =====
- One of the bills passed under the old (pre-1986) rules was a 1964 private member's bill to rename "Trans-Canada Airlines" to "Air Canada", introduced by then-rookie MP Jean Chrétien. Chrétien got his bill voted on by convincing the other MPs scheduled to speak during Private Member's Hour to skip their speech and instead request an immediate vote on the bill.

===== After the 1986 rules =====
The new rules took effect in 1986. In the 24 years between 5 November 1984 and 7 September 2008, 81 private members' bills passed. Passage was (and is) more likely during the periods of minority governments in Canada. The ramifications of the 1986 rules and new probability of success of private members bills were discussed in the Canadian Parliamentary Review, 1988, Vol 11, No. 3.

- NDP MP Lynn McDonald succeeded in getting her private member's bill, the "Non-smokers' Health Act" (aka Bill C-204), passed in 1986, (given royal assent on 28 June 1988) restricting smoking in federally regulated workplaces and on airplanes, trains and ships. The bill was passed in a free vote of the House of Commons despite being voted against by all members of the federal cabinet, including the Minister of Health.

=== Hong Kong ===
Article 74 of the Hong Kong Basic Law prohibits private members' bills that relate to public expenditure, political structure or the operation of the Government. Private members' bills that involve government policies must be agreed by the chief executive. Whether the bill involves such issues are to be determined by the Legislative Council president. For private members' bills proposed for the particular interest or benefit of any individual, association or body corporate, a fee of HK$33,500 for amendment bills, and HK$67,000 for principal bills must also be paid to the director of Accounting Services.

=== India ===
Of the 300 or so private members' bills introduced in the 14th Lok Sabha, barely 4% were discussed; 96% lapsed without even a single debate in the House. To date, Parliament has passed a total of 14 private members' bills.

The following are the 14 private members' bills which were passed:

1. The Muslim Wakfs Bill introduced by Syed Md. Ahmed Kasmi in Lok Sabha
2. The Code of Criminal Procedure (Amendment) Bill introduced by Raghunath Singh in Lok Sabha
3. The Indian Registration (Amendment) Bill introduced by SC Samanta in Lok Sabha
4. The Proceedings of Legislature (Protection of Publication) Bill introduced by Feroze Gandhi in Lok Sabha
5. The Women's and Children's Institutions (Licensing) Bill introduced by Rajmata Kamlendu in Lok Sabha
6. Historical Monuments and Archaeological Sites and Remains (Declaration of National Importance) Bill introduced by Raghubir Sinh in Rajya Sabha
7. The Hindu Marriage (Amendment) Bill introduced by Seeta Parmanand in Rajya Sabha
8. The Code of Criminal Procedure (Amendment) Bill introduced by Subhadra Joshi in Lok Sabha
9. The Orphanages and other Charitable Homes (Supervision and Control) Bill introduced by Kailash Bihari Lal in Rajya Sabha
10. The Marine Insurance Bill introduced by MP Bhargava in Rajya Sabha
11. The Hindu Marriage (Amendment) Bill introduced by Diwan Chand Sharma in Lok Sabha
12. The Salaries and Allowances of MP (Amendment) Bill introduced by Raghunath Singh in Lok Sabha
13. Indian Penal Code (Amendment) Bill introduced by Diwan Chand Lal in Rajya Sabha
14. The SC (enlargement of Criminal Appellate Jurisdiction) Bill introduced by Anand Narain in Lok Sabha

Five of these were passed in 1956 alone and after 47 years of passing the last bill, the Supreme Court (Enlargement of Criminal Appellate Jurisdiction) Bill, 1968 that became an Act on 9 August 1970; Rajya Sabha has passed the Rights of Transgender Persons Bill, 2014 on April 24, 2015, which was introduced in the lower house, the Lok Sabha, on 26 February 2016.

=== Israel ===
In Israel, a private member's bill (Hebrew: הצעת חוק פרטית) is a bill introduced in the Knesset by an MK who is neither a cabinet minister nor a deputy minister. The number of private members' bills an individual MK can submit is restricted, and their introduction requires approval by the Knesset Presidium (composed of the speaker of the Knesset and their deputies), who are allowed to reject bills which are racist in their essence or reject the Jewish character of the state.

Unlike government bills, which can be withdrawn at any point before their third reading, a private member's bill cannot be withdrawn after its committee stage, which occurs between first and second readings. In addition, private members' bills must undergo a preliminary reading, while government bills go to first reading directly when they are introduced.

Compared to other Westminster system parliaments, the number of private members' bills introduced in the Knesset is very large: Between 2000 and 2016, the number of private members' bills introduced before the Knesset was 22,949, a world record.

The number of laws passed by the Knesset which were introduced as private member's bills is also much larger than other Westminster system parliaments, but similar to those of continental European parliaments. However, this is a relatively recent phenomenon – while only 6% of laws passed by the Third Knesset were introduced as private members' bills, the equivalent share for the Fifteenth Knesset is 53%, a slight majority.

=== Malaysia ===
As of September 2021, no private member's bill was passed in the Malaysian parliament.

=== New Zealand ===
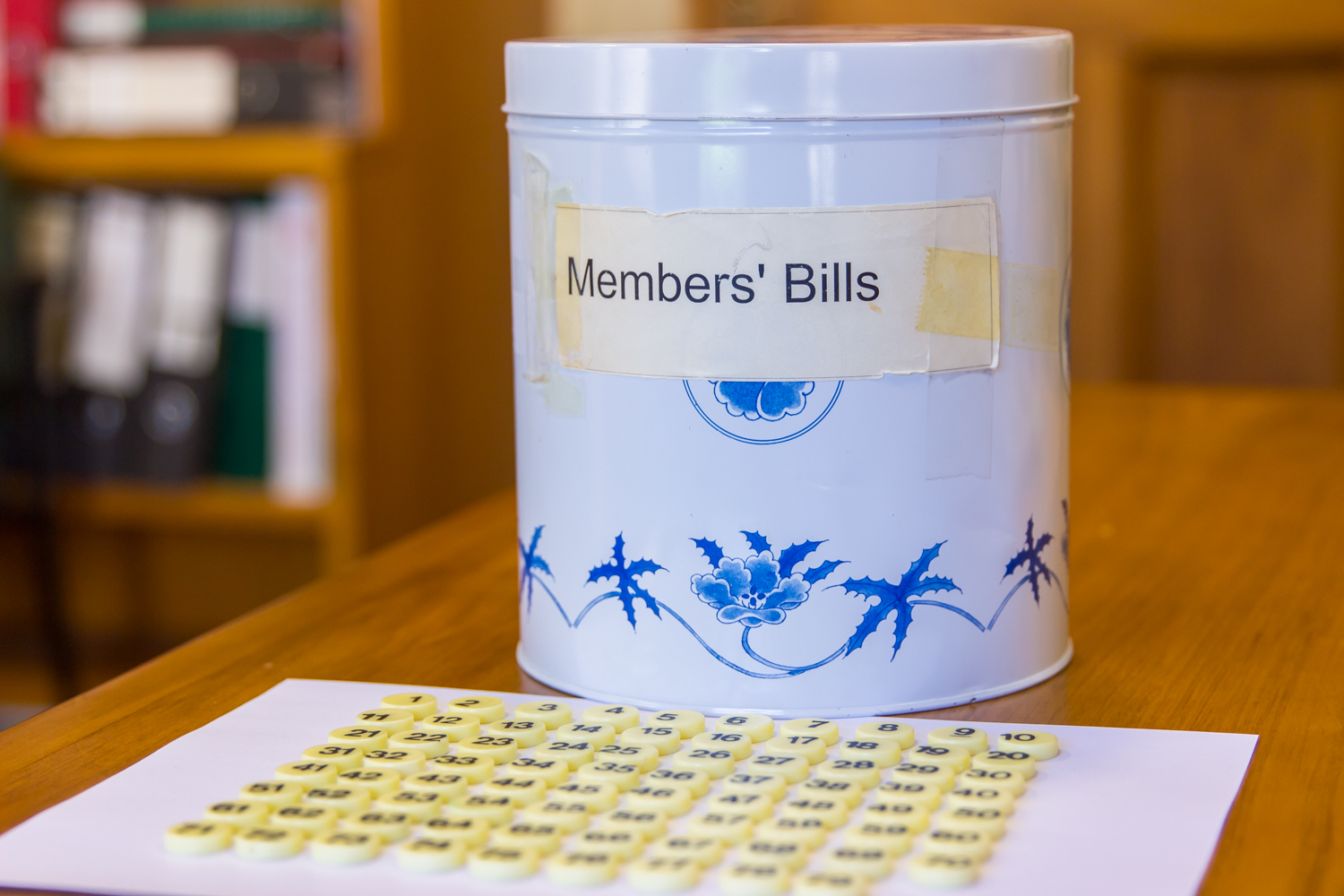
The biscuit tin and numbered counters used to select new member's bill in New Zealand

In New Zealand, a member's bill (often misattributed as private member's bill) is one that is introduced by a member of Parliament who is not a minister. There can be a maximum of eight members' bills on the Order Paper awaiting their first reading at any one time. When a slot opens up, a ballot is held to select a new members' bill for introduction; each MP can submit only one member's bill at a time to the ballot. Every second Wednesday is reserved for debating members' bills, although this rule is overridden when certain government business is before the House, such as the Budget. Even when a Wednesday is devoted to members' bills, any private or local bills on the Order Paper are considered first.

The ballot to select new members' bills is conducted by drawing numbered counters out of a biscuit tin, purchased in the 1980s from now-defunct department store chain DEKA. As a result, the member's bill process is nicknamed "biscuit tin democracy".

Starting with the 53rd Parliament (2020–23), a member's bill can be introduced directly if it has the support of at least 61 non-executive members of Parliament. This allows members' bills with broad support to avoid the ballot process, while excluding executive members prevents the member's bill process being an alternative way of progressing Government business.

Notable legislation passed as a result of a member's bill includes:

- Adult Adoption Information Act 1985 – allowed adult adoptees to access information about their birth parents
- Homosexual Law Reform Act 1986 – decriminalised homosexual acts between men
- Prostitution Reform Act 2003 – decriminalised prostitution
- Crimes (Substituted Section 59) Amendment Act 2007 – removed "reasonable force" legal defence for assault of children by parents
- Marriage (Definition of Marriage) Amendment Act 2013 – legalised same-sex marriage
- End of Life Choice Act 2019 – provided for a binding referendum to give people with a terminal illness the option of requesting assisted dying

=== Norway ===
In the Parliament of Norway, any member may submit a private member's bill, called a representative's bill (Norwegian: representantforslag lovvedtak). The other method of initiating legislation is by a "Proposition to the Storting" from the Government.

=== South Africa ===
While most legislation in the Parliament of South Africa is introduced by the Executive, any Member of Parliament (MP) may introduce their own private member's bill (PMB). The right to do so is provided for in Section 73(2) of the Constitution of South Africa, and was affirmed by the Oriani-Ambrosini v Sisulu judgement in 2012.

Since the 2012 ruling, and after a new mechanism for submitting PMBs was put in place, only two PMBs have been adopted by the country's parliament. The first was COPE member Deidre Carter's 2018 Civil Union Amendment Bill, which was passed in 2020. The second was ACDP member Cheryllyn Dudley's 2018 Labour Laws Amendment Bill, which was also passed in 2020.

Since President Ramaphosa's third cabinet, a coalition of seven parties which was appointed on 30 June 2024, South Africa has seen a significant increase in private member's bills. During the previous term of government, 13% of all bills submitted to Parliament were PMBs. However, during the subsequent term, around 40% are PMBs. About half of those are from major governing partner the Democratic Alliance. Furthermore, approximately 32% of all PMBs before Parliament in July 2026 proposed Constitutional amendments.

=== United Kingdom ===
In the United Kingdom House of Commons, there are several routes to introducing private members' bills. In each session, twenty backbench MPs are selected by ballot to introduce a bill. These bills are given priority for debate and generally offer the best chance of success. Additional bills may be introduced via the Ten Minute Rule, although this is usually used just to raise an issue rather than legislate on it, or through presentation without debate under Standing Order 57. Neither Ten Minute Rule or presentation bills are likely to get time to be debated, so only non-controversial bills have any chance of success. Private members' bills from the Lords may also be adopted by an MP to complete their journey through Parliament.

Private members' bills can sometimes become the cause for much anxiety and shenanigans, as outside individuals or organisations seek to influence members who have been selected in the ballot.

There are two principal routes for influencing UK law:

- Lobbying a government department or minister.
- Lobbying a member of parliament who has a private member's bill coming up.

Only a small proportion of private members' bills are enacted. This is generally because of lack of time – a controversial private member's bill can be "talked out". In some cases, measures that a government does not want to take responsibility for may be introduced by backbenchers, with the government secretly or openly backing the measure and ensuring its passage. They are sometimes known as "handouts" or "whips' bills". The Abortion Act 1967 was enacted in the United Kingdom through this means: with the Bill itself being introduced by a Liberal Party Member of Parliament, David Steel; through the support from Labour Home Secretary Roy Jenkins the Bill was given enough government time to allow a full debate.

Other private members' bills to have been enacted include the Adoption Act 1964, the Murder (Abolition of Death Penalty) Act 1965, the Charter Trustees Act 1985, the Law Reform (Year and a Day Rule) Act 1996, the Knives Act 1997, the British Nationality (Hong Kong) Act 1997, the Mental Health (Discrimination) Act 2003 the Female Genital Mutilation Act 2003, the Gangmasters (Licensing) Act 2004, the Sustainable Communities Act 2007.

==== House of Commons procedure ====
In principle, private members' bills follow much the same parliamentary stages as any other bill. In practice, the procedural barriers to passage are much greater.

Time is allocated for private members' bills on 13 Fridays a year in the House of Commons. Five hours of time are available each day, and several private members' bills are scheduled for each session.

Unlike Government bills, debates are not timetabled and there is no guarantee that the debate will finish within the time available. MPs opposed to a private member's bill, including Government ministers and whips, will routinely attempt to talk out the bill, stopping further progress by preventing a vote. The bill's proponent can force a vote only with the support of at least a hundred members (and a majority of those voting). As many MPs return to their constituencies on Thursday night, this has the practical effect of blocking all private members' bills without solid support.

It is quite possible for the first bill to take up all five hours, preventing any other bill on the agenda from being debated. Any bill not debated may receive second reading without debate at the end of the session, but a single shout of "object!" will delay consideration to a future date; Government and opposition whips routinely block contentious private members' bills in this way. Another date for second reading will also be set for bills which have been talked out. This is a formality; the bill will be put to the bottom of the order paper, will likely be objected to on each future occasion and has no practical chance of success.

Even if second reading is passed, a bill is likely to need the support of the government to become law. The bill will be referred to public bill committee, which may make amendments. The amended version of the bill will then return to the Commons. To become law, it must also successfully negotiate report stage and third reading, as well as the House of Lords. Contentious bills are likely to run out of parliamentary time unless the government allocates some; any pending private members' bills lapse at the end of each parliamentary session.

Private members' bills may also originate in the House of Lords. To become law, these bills must be adopted by an MP and passed in the same way as a bill originated in the Commons.

== See also ==
- Bill (proposed law)
- Motion (parliamentary procedure)
- Private bill
- Right of initiative (legislative)
- Table (parliamentary procedure), which has a different meaning in the US compared to the other countries mentioned in this article.
