= De Krant =

Monthly magazine for Dutch immigrants in Canada and the United States

Maandblad de Krant
- Editor: Tom Bijvoet
- Categories: Ethnic newspaper
- Frequency: Bi-monthly
- Circulation: 6000
- First issue: 1969
- Company: Mokeham Publishing Inc
- Country: Canada
- Based in: Oakville
- Language: Dutch
- Website: http://www.dekrant.biz

Maandblad de Krant (formerly de Hollandse Krant) is a monthly magazine for Dutch immigrants in Canada and the United States. Since April 2008 it has been published by Mokeham Publishing Inc. First in Penticton, British Columbia, in 2013 the publishing firm relocated to Oakville, Ontario. Previously it was published by the Timmer Publishing Company in Langley. Maandblad de Krant is also known to its readers as De Krant, which is Dutch for "the Newspaper". It is printed in a tabloid newspaper format and is the only North American publication that caters to Dutch immigrants. De Krant has a monthly column in West Frisian, covering a quarter page. It is the only publication in North America that publishes original material in the West Frisian language.

De Krant brings a selection of news stories related to the Netherlands, but its main focus is the publication of personal columns and editorials by a number of Dutch immigrants to Canada and the United States. These include the editor, Tom Bijvoet, Lia Wolters from Toronto, Ontario, Henny Campbell from Ottawa, Ontario, Stefanie Prins from British Columbia, Aubrey Beauchamp from San Clemente, and Herman Thorbecke from Georgia. In addition to news and columns De Krant publishes letters to the editor and carries advertisements for ethnic Dutch businesses in North America.

De Krant has approximately 6,000 subscribers throughout North America, with about 1500 each in Ontario and British Columbia, its two largest markets. The paper is sold in a small number of "Dutch Stores" (grocery stores catering to the Dutch immigrant community) in Western Canada, Ontario, Texas, California and Oregon.

De Hollandse Krant first appeared in 1969.

== See also ==
- List of magazines in Canada
