= What if chart =

Visual chart tool

A what if chart (Whif chart, WHIF analysis, etc.) is a visual tool for modeling the outcome of a combination of different factors. The table can represent actual results or predicted outcome based on combinations of parameters. It is a visual equivalent of asking the question, what if...? or 'what happens if...?' multiple times for each and every factor being considered.

== Other uses ==
What if charts are also used as classroom tools to facilitate cognition. In business this is also known as a WHIF (What Happens If) analysis.

== Example 1 - Selecting a restaurant ==
Table 1	Chinese	Tex-Mex	Italian
Lou	tolerates	dislikes	prefers
Mandi	dislikes	prefers	tolerates
Logan	prefers	dislikes	tolerates
Elle	dislikes	tolerates	prefers

Table 1 attempts to predict best choice of restaurant for a group of friends based on each one's food preferences. Each person rates the choices based on the food they prefer, the food they can tolerate, and the food they dislike. All their preferences are put in a what if chart to determine how happy they will be with the choice.

Assuming Mandi and Logan are willing to compromise, clearly Italian food would be the best choice for the group.

== Example 2 - Analysis of color genetics ==
Table 2	Red (Pollen)	yellow (Pollen)
Red (flower)	Red (Seeds)	Red* (Seeds)
yellow (flower)	Red* (Seeds)	yellow (Seeds)

Table 2 is simplified example from Mendelian genetics involving controlled breeding of flowers. It demonstrates the outcome when flowers of different colors are crossed with each other. The dominant color gene (Red) decides the outcome when crossed with recessive color gene (yellow) producing a hybrid (Red*) flower. If either parent possesses the dominant gene, the table shows the outcome that results.

== See also ==
- What If (disambiguation)
- Sensitivity analysis
- Punnett Square
