= Jay Isaac =

Canadian artist (born 1975)

- Born: 1975 (age 50–51); Saint John, New Brunswick, Canada
- Known for: Painter, graphic artist, collagist, sculptor

Jay Isaac (born 1975) is a Canadian artist based in Rowley, New Brunswick, Canada. He is known primarily for his painting, but he has produced numerous projects within the social sphere. He was founder, editor, publisher, and designer of Hunter and Cook magazine (2009–2011). He founded and ran the @nationalgalleryofcanada Instagram account (2014–2016). He founded and co-runs Peter Estey Fine Art, an auction house dedicated to presenting idiosyncratic historical Canadian art (2018–present). Isaac is represented by Paul Petro Contemporary Art in Toronto.

== Early life and education ==
Isaac was born in Saint John, New Brunswick and is of Lebanese descent. He attended Cardiff School of Art and Design in Wales in 1996 and graduated from the Emily Carr Institute of Art and Design in 1997.

== Career ==
In 2020, Isaac was awarded a Chalmers Fellowship through the Ontario Arts Council to research historic mural production in former Soviet Ukraine and Georgia and New Deal era murals from the United States. This research developed into a series of large scale paintings titled Mural Studies, which were exhibited at Paul Petro Contemporary Art, Toronto, in 2021.

In 2018, the Toronto publisher Swimmers Group published "Like a Baby I Was Born Again", a book of Isaac’s drawings. The drawings were surreal, social and political commentary cartoons. Two of the drawings were exhibited at The Brucke Museum in Berlin.

His series "Second Eye", which was exhibited at Monte Clark Gallery, Toronto in 2012, was fabricated using a combination of unsold furniture items from a small antique shop he ran in Toronto and unresolved works in his studio. The amalgamation of the two "failed" components produced idiosyncratic sculptural works that writer Ben Portis described as "the nerviest gallery encounter of the year".

Between 2005–2010, Isaac collaborated with musician Lorenz Peter to create Bay of Creatures, an experimental music project. A compilation was released by Toronto label Paper+Sound in 2017.

== Selected exhibits ==
=== Group ===
- Winnipeg Art Gallery, Winnipeg, MB, 2024
- 560 Gallery, Vancouver, BC, 2023
- Season Gallery, Seattle, WA, 2020
- Brucke Museum, Berlin, 2019
- McIntosh Gallery, London ON, 2019
- Beaverbrook Art Gallery, 2014
- Contemporary Art Gallery (Vancouver), 2010
- Art Gallery of Ontario, 2009
- Agnes Etherington Art Centre, 2007
- Museum of Contemporary Canadian Art, 2006
- The Power Plant, 2004
- White Columns, 2004
- Bologna Gallery of Modern Art, 2002

=== Solo ===
- "Drawings 1996-2023", Paul Petro Contemporary Art, Toronto, 2025
- "Pitch Assembling", Paul Petro Contemporary Art, Toronto, 2023
- "Log Pile Variations", James Fuentes, New York, NY, 2022
- "Mural Studies", Paul Petro Contemporary Art, Toronto, 2021
- "Midnight Repairs", Paul Petro Contemporary Art, Toronto, 2019
- "High Gloss Ceilings", Cooper Cole, Toronto, 2017
- Monte Clark Gallery, 2012 and 2014
- Paul Petro Contemporary Art, 2010
- CUE art foundation, 2005
- Mercer Union, 2002

== Collections ==
- Agnes Etherington Art Centre, Kingston, Ontario
- Glenbow Museum, Calgary, Alberta
- Macdonald Stewart Art Centre, Guelph, Ontario
- Osler, Hoskin & Harcourt, Toronto
- The Robert McLaughlin Gallery, Oshawa, Ontario
- Tom Thomson Art Gallery, Owen Sound, Ontario
- Winnipeg Art Gallery, Winnipeg Manotiba
- Museum London, London, ON
- Ivey School of Business, London, ON
- Beaverbrook Art Gallery, Fredericton, NB

== Selected publications ==
- Off the Grid, Abstract Painting in New Brunswick, 2014, Beaverbrook Art Gallery
- Fantasy Art Now, 2014, ed. Jay Isaac & Sebastian Frye, Swimmer's Group, ISBN 978-0-9938723-3-4
- 60 Painters, 2012
- Triumphant Carrot: The Persistence of Still Life, 2010, Contemporary Art Gallery, Vancouver
- Hunter and Cook, 2008-2011, periodical, issues #01-10, Jay Isaac and Tony Romano
- Carte Blanche, Vol. 2: Painting, 2008, Magenta Foundation
- Jay Isaac, 2005, Cue Foundation, NY
- Officina America, 2002, Museum of Modern Art, Bologna, Italy
- Selling Out and Buying In, 2002, BizArt, Shanghai

== Selected works ==
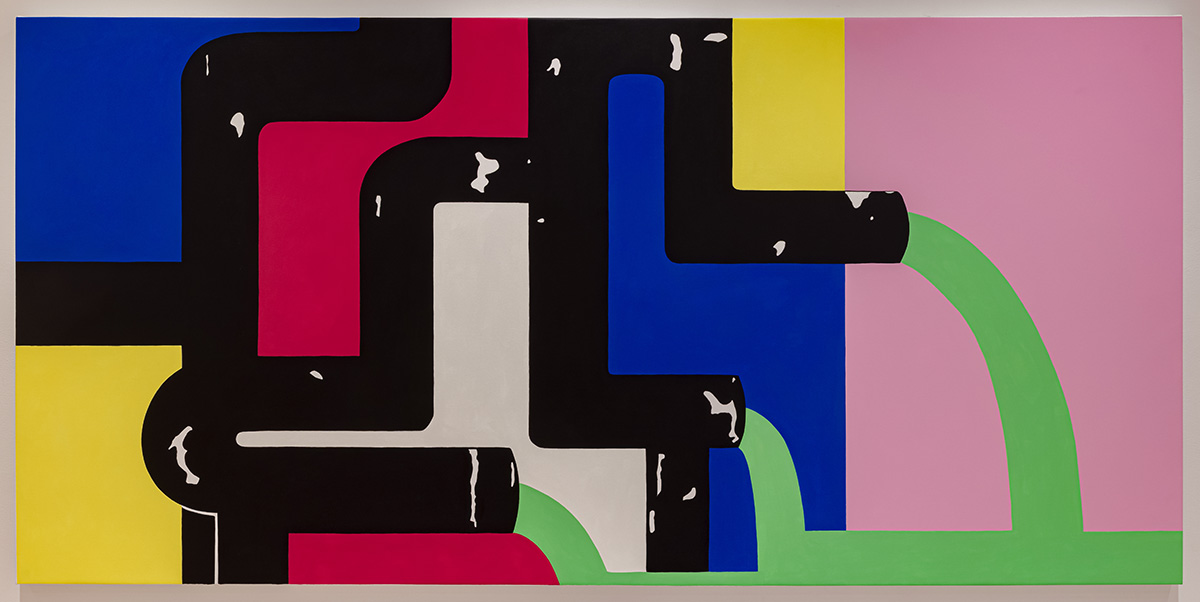

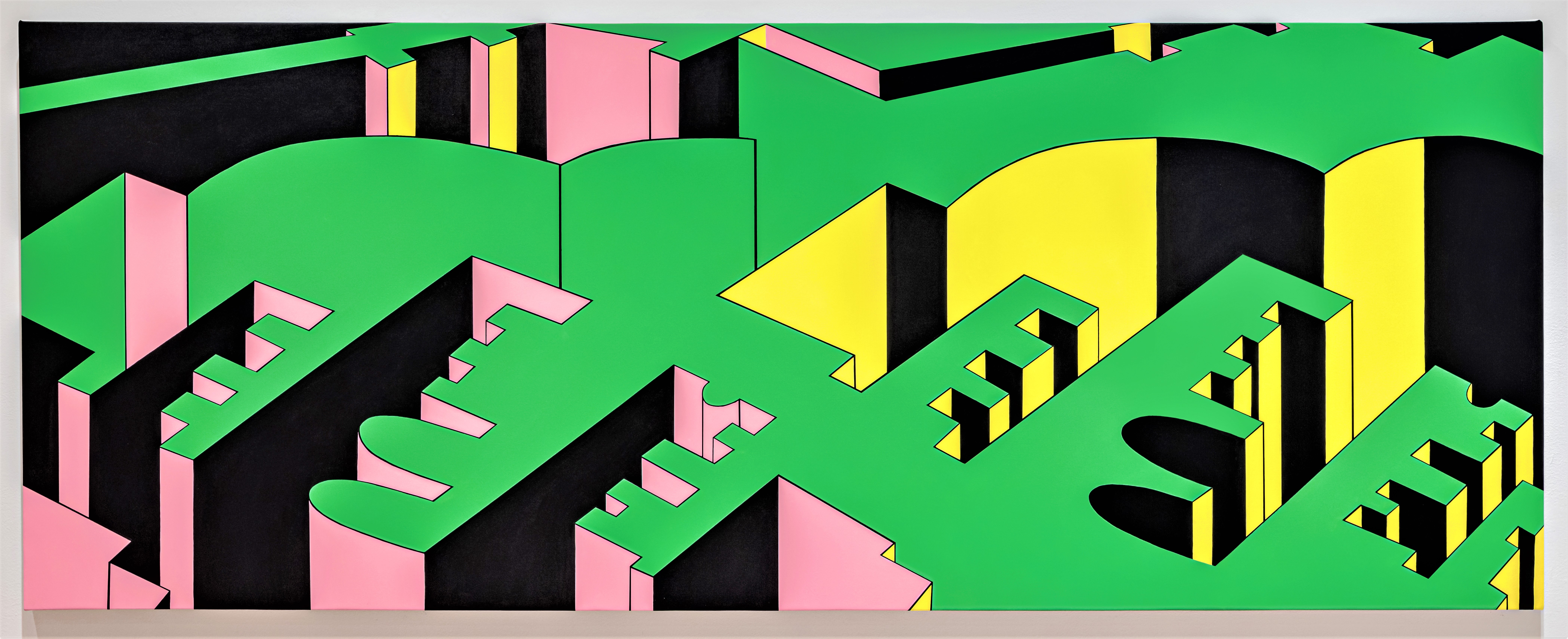

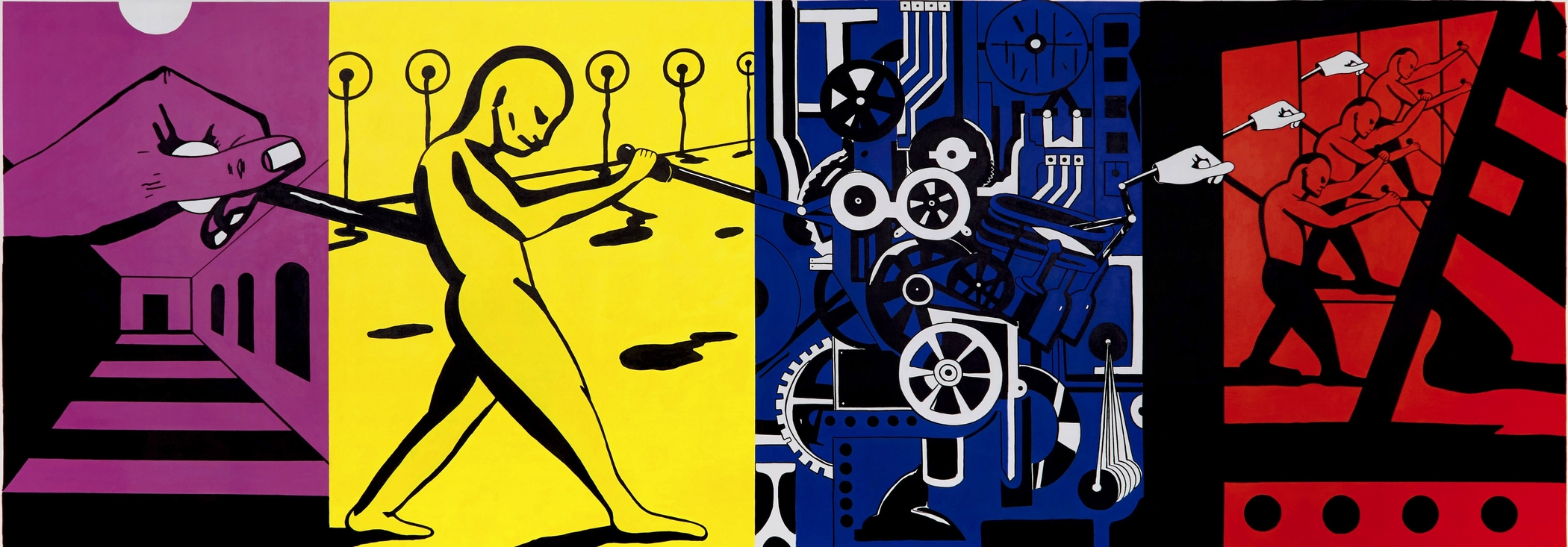

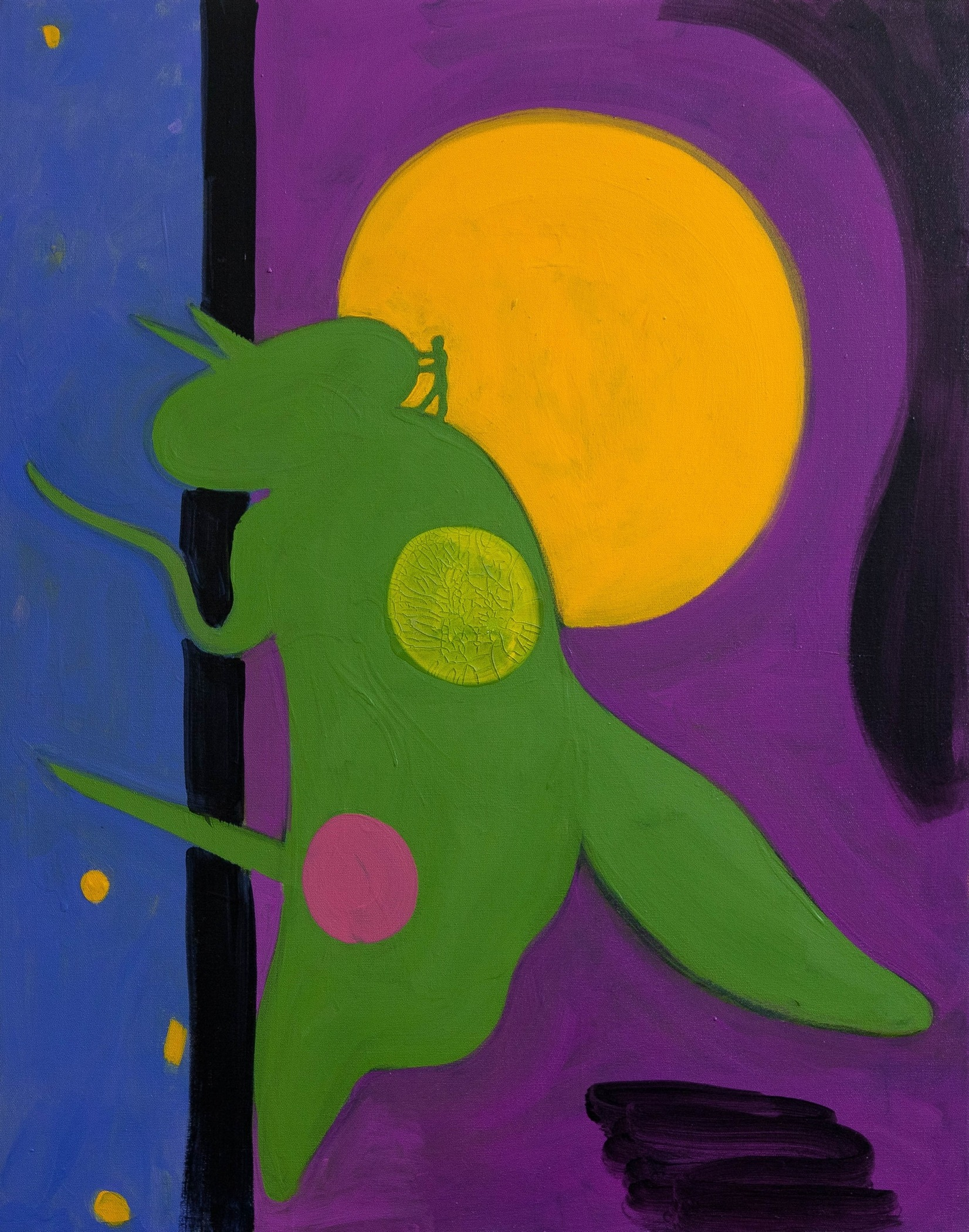

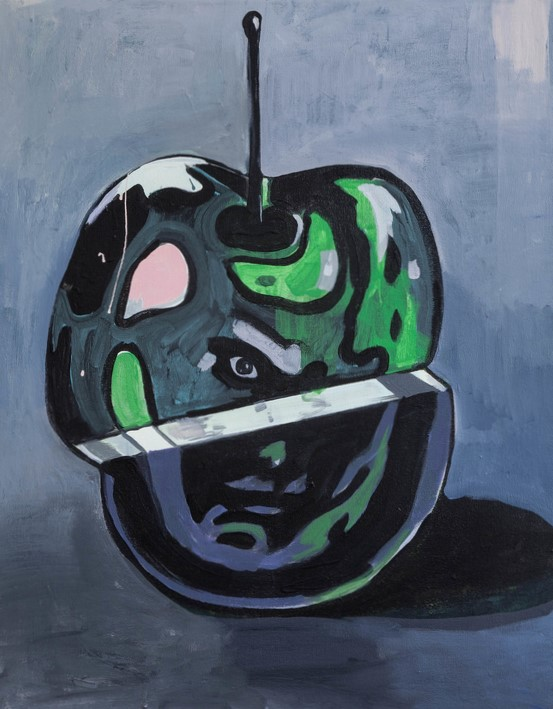
