= Canadian Home & Country =

Canadian magazine

- Cover of typical issue
- Editor: Erin McLaughlin
- Categories: Lifestyle
- Frequency: 8 annually
- Circulation: 101,000
- Founded: 1987
- Final issue: February/March 2009
- Company: Transcontinental Media
- Country: Canada
- Based in: Toronto
- Language: English
- Website: Canadian Home and Country
- ISSN: 0838-9330

Canadian Home & Country magazine was launched in the 1980s to offer decorating and style advice traditional Canadian homes. The magazine was relaunched in 2000 as Canada's magazine about country homes and style. Article topics include home décor, recipes, antiques and collectibles, and style advice. One of the editors was Cobi Ladner. The final editor was Erin McLaughlin.

Published eight times a year, Canadian Home & Country magazine was owned by Transcontinental Media, which bought original publisher Avid Media in 2004. The magazine also organized the Canadian Home & Country Show every October. Transcontinental closed Canadian Home & Country in 2009.
