= Cult MTL =

Canadian arts magazine in Quebec

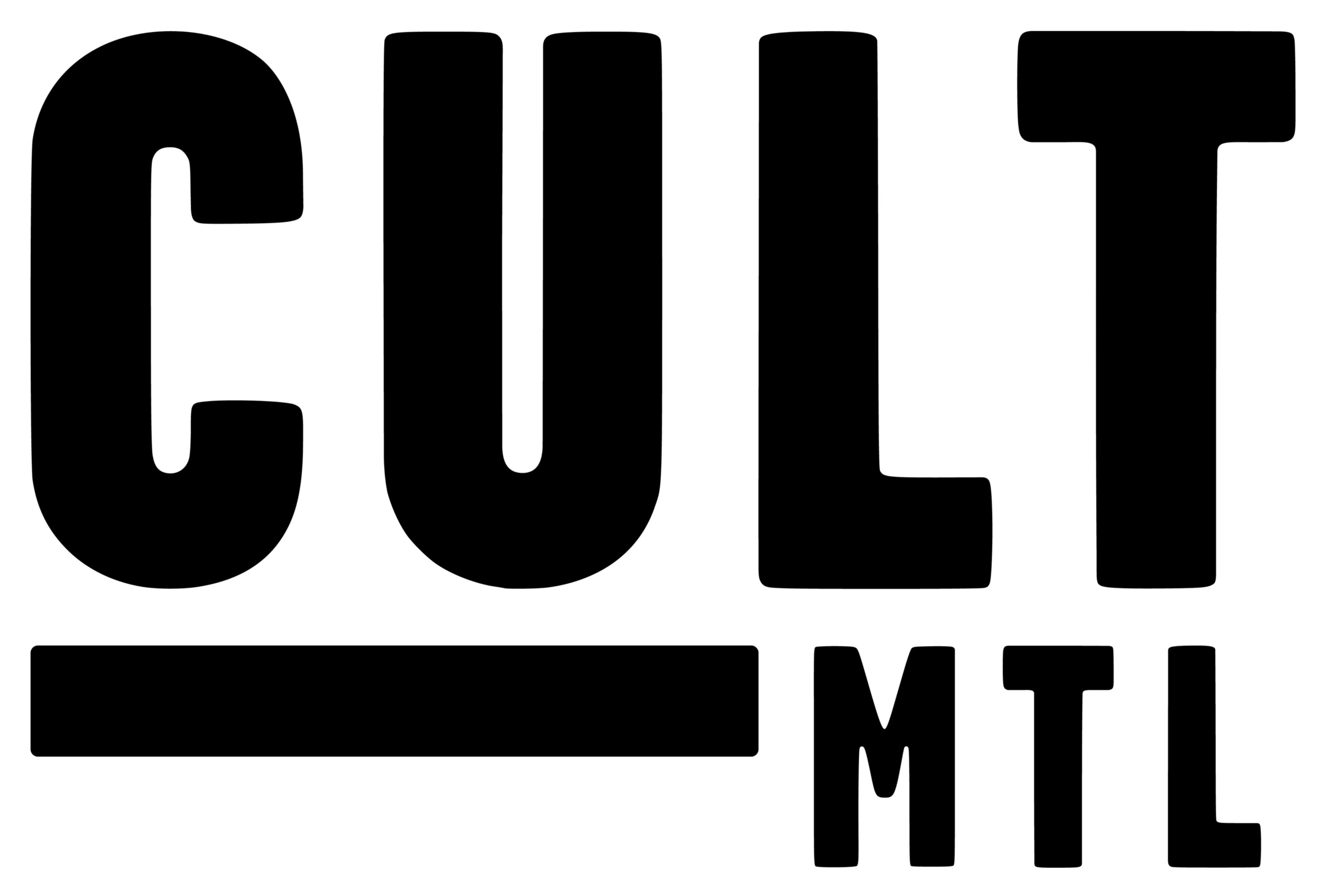

- Format: Magazine
- Owner: Lorraine Carpenter
- Editor-in-chief: Lorraine Carpenter
- Founded: 7 September 2012
- Language: English
- Headquarters: Montreal, Quebec
- Website: cultmtl.com

Cult MTL is an English language arts, culture and news website and monthly print publication, based in Montreal, Quebec, Canada. Its first print edition appeared on 7 September 2012. Cult MTL first launched as a website in July, 2012 after Montreal's last English-language alt-weekly newspaper, Montreal Mirror was closed in June of the same year by its parent company, Quebecor. The company cited competition from the digital landscape for the abrupt halt to the Mirror's run.

As of May 2026, Cult MTL remains a daily website and free monthly print magazine..

== See also ==
- List of magazines in Canada
