= Wendy Priesnitz =

Canadian politician

- Occupations: Politician; Author; Educator
- Known for: Homeschooling and unschooling advocacy
- Political party: Green Party of Canada (leader, July 1996 - January 1997)
- Website: Official website

Wendy Priesnitz is a Canadian advocate of alternative education and environmentalism. She was leader of the Green Party of Canada from July 1996 to January 1997.

== Early life ==
Priesnitz originally trained to be a teacher. She then decided to educate her children at home.

She founded the Canadian Alliance of Home Schoolers in 1979.

== Teaching and publishing career ==
She focuses on lifelong learning and biomimicry as a reason to look at decentralised or home (or autonomous) education.

She is known for her advocacy of homeschooling/unschooling and home-based/green business. She describes the educational benefits as, "[unschooling] children generally live and learn, with the support of their families, based on their own interests and their timetables, and without curriculum, tests, or grades.".

Priesnitz and her husband run Life Media (formerly The Alternative Press). Since 1976, she has co-owned and edited Natural Life (magazine), an award-winning sustainable lifestyles magazine. In 2002, she founded Life Learning Magazine, which she owns and edits.

She is the author of several books on homeschooling.

== Works ==
- Priesnitz, Wendy (1976). Summer love, winter fires. The Alternate Press. ISBN 0-920118-00-3.
- Priesnitz, Wendy (1987). School Free - The Homeschooling Handbook. The Alternate Press. ISBN 0-920118-04-6.
- Priesnitz, Wendy (1990). Markham: Canada's community of the future : a contemporary portrait. Windsor Publications, in co-operation with the Markham Board of Trade. ISBN 0-89781-327-8.
- Priesnitz, Wendy (1991). The House Where I Grew Up. The Alternate Press. ISBN 0-920118-03-8.
- Priesnitz, Wendy; Heidi Priesnitz (1993). The Natural Life Cookbook. The Alternate Press. ISBN 0-920118-17-8.
- Priesnitz, Wendy (1996). Bringing It Home - A Home Business Start-Up Guide for You and Your Family. The Alternate Press. ISBN 0-920118-99-2.
- Priesnitz, Wendy (2000). Challenging Assumptions in Education. The Alternate Press. ISBN 0-920118-05-4.

== See also ==
- Homeschooling in Canada
