= Lisa Congdon =

American fine artist, author and illustrator

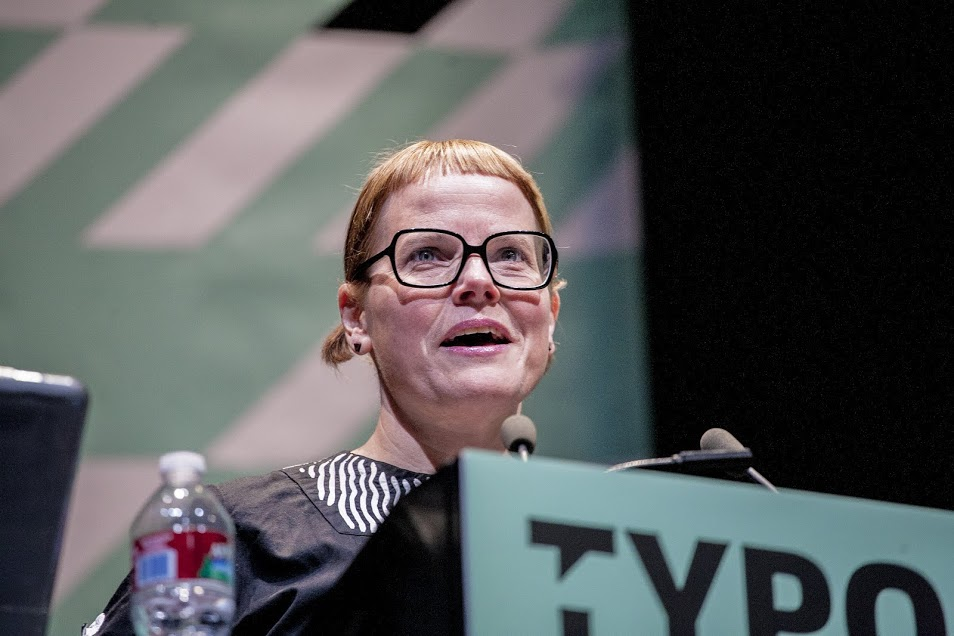
- Congdon at the San Francisco conference in 2014
- Born: January 17, 1968 (age 58)
- Occupations: Fine artist; author; illustrator
- Spouse: Clay Lauren Walsh (m. 2013)

Lisa Congdon (born January 17, 1968) is an American fine artist, author and illustrator.

She has worked for clients including MoMA, Harvard University, Martha Stewart Living, REI, and Chronicle Books. Congdon is the author of Art Inc: The Essential Guide to Building Your Career as an Artist; Whatever You Are, Be a Good One; Twenty Ways to Draw a Tulip; Fortune Favors the Brave; The Joy of Swimming; A Glorious Freedom: Older Women Leading Extraordinary Lives; and A Collection A Day. She has also illustrated six coloring books for adults as part of her Just Add Color series. Notable books adorned by Lisa’s illustrations include Broad Strokes (Chronicle Books, 2017) and Tender Buttons by Gertrude Stein (Chronicle Books, 2013).

== Biography ==
Congdon grew up in upstate New York and Northern California. She married her partner Clay Lauren Walsh on June 1, 2013. She lives and works in Portland, Oregon.

=== Awards and honors ===
Congdon was named one of 40 Women Over 40 to Watch in 2015. and she is featured in the 2017 book, 200 Women Who Will Change the Way you See the World.

== Authored books ==
=== A Collection A Day ===
Congdon started a blog called A Collection A Day, which was started in January 2010. Over the course of a year, Congdon posted a collection a day of various items she has acquired. According to Congdon, the collections were assembled from "flea markets, thrift stores, junk shops, garage sales, giveaway piles and family attics." The collections featured are often everyday objects such as 14 mid-century napkin rings (day 113) or eight old pencil sharpeners for Day 78).

A Collection A Day was published as a printed book in 2011 by UPPERCASE magazine.

=== Whatever You Are, Be a Good One ===
Published in April 2014 by Chronicle Books, Whatever You Are, Be a Good One is a collection of 100 quotes from notable writers, all illustrated and hand-lettered by Lisa Congdon. Some of the quotes come from Albert Camus, Oscar Wilde, Leo Tolstoy, and Anaïs Nin.

The book began when Congdon wanted to incorporate more hand-lettering into her practice, which she started to do by creating her "365 Days of Hand Lettering Project" on her blog over the course of 2012. The project evolved from drawing individual letters to full quotes. Over time, after Congdon had shared these images, she learned that readers found that the quotes had "...comforted them in times of darkness or reminded them to approach a challenge in a new way." From there, the focus of the book became a celebration of great thinkers as well as a way of sharing their words with a larger community.

=== Art Inc. The Essential Guide for Building Your Career as an Artist ===
Congdon also authored Art Inc. The Essential Guide for Building Your Career as an Artist which was published in August 2014 by Chronicle Books. The book introduces information about creating and starting a creative business, as well as offers insight from other illustrators, designers and entrepreneurs. The book offers tools and information on how to "set actionable goals, diversify your income, manage your bookkeeping, copyright your work, promote with social media, build a standout website, exhibit with galleries, sell and price your work, license your art, acquire an agent, and more."

=== Fortune Favors the Brave ===
Published in August 2015 by Chronicle Books, and similar to her prior book Whatever You Are, Be A Good One, Fortune Favors the Brave features 100 illustrated and hand-lettered quotations themed on courage, bravery, authenticity, and individuality.

=== The Joy of Swimming: A Celebration of Our Love for Getting in the Water ===
Debuted in April 2016 and published by Chronicle Books, The Joy of Swimming: A Celebration of Our Love for Getting in the Water, celebrates swimming through hand lettered quotes, watercolor portraits of swimmers paired with real personal swimming stories, and illustrated collections of swimming objects such as traditional pool signs and bathing suits through history. The book also includes a foreword written by Lynne Cox, an American long-distance open-water swimmer and writer.

=== A Glorious Freedom: Older Women Leading Extraordinary Lives ===
Published by Chronicle Books in October 2017, A Glorious Freedom: Older Women Leading Extraordinary Lives, is a collection of profiles, interviews, and essays from women (including Vera Wang, Laura Ingalls Wilder, Julia Child and Cheryl Strayed) who found creative fulfillment and made accomplishments past the age of forty. The texts are illustrated and hand-lettered by Congdon.

== Art exhibitions ==
Congdon's gallery (group and solo) shows include participation at the Dorothy Saxe Invitational Exhibition at the Contemporary Jewish Museum (San Francisco, 2012), Museum of Design (Atlanta, 2017), Bedford Gallery (Walnut Creek, CA, 2013, 2014), and Fullerton College in 2018.

She has participated in artist residencies at Summit Powder Mountain (2015) and Fullerton College (2018).
