= Séquences =

- Categories: Film magazine
- Frequency: Monthly
- Founded: 1955
- Country: Canada
- Based in: Montreal
- Language: French
- Website: Revuesequences.org

Séquences is a French-language film magazine originally published in Montreal, Quebec by the Commission des ciné-clubs du Centre catholique du cinéma de Montréal, a Roman Catholic film society. It is the third oldest French film magazine in publication after Les Cahiers du cinéma and Positif.

== History and profile ==
Séquences was founded in 1955. The publication was edited for forty years by Léo Bonneville, a member of the Clerics of Saint Viator and Quebec film scholar. In 2009 the website of the magazine was launched. Élie Castiel is the editor of Séquences.

== See also ==
- Ciné-Bulles
- 24 images
- List of film periodicals
