= Stitches: The Journal of Medical Humour =

Canadian humour magazine

Stitches: The Journal of Medical Humour was a print-based Canadian-based humour magazine. It was conceived and founded by Dr. John Cocker, a family physician from Aurora, Ontario in 1990. It rapidly became the best read medical journal in Canada, and was published under licence in Australia, UK, USA and South Africa. At its peak, it was a 200-page monthly journal. After being sold to Canada Law Book in 2005, they were unable to sell enough advertising space, and it ceased publication in 2007. In 2011, Dr John Cocker bought back the magazine, and it is now published as an online magazine, every month.

== Contents ==
Stitches had a wide variety of articles from both doctors and patients, and included features from regular authors (columns), as well as many independent writers (features). Each issue contained a large cartoon on the front cover, often depicting a doctor in a humorous situation. The magazine itself contained cartoons interspersed with the articles inside. Many humorous letters from physicians were published each month, and the best one was awarded the STITCHES Gold Stethoscope, this item being specially made by 3M.

=== Regular columns ===
Regular columns accounted for a large part of the magazine's content, containing material sent in from regular authors. There were 6 contributors to the columns section, each with their own brand of wit and sarcasm.

The following articles are listed by their article name.

==== Proctalgia ====
A column by Dr John Cocker appeared in the first 150 issues consisting of news, views and often off-beat humour.

==== Bad Advice for Better Living ====
Authored by psychiatrist Lara Hazelton, Bad Advice for Better Living was changed to Best Evidence for Worst Practices in Spring 2006. Hazelton lends her psychiatric advice to questions sent in by her unsuspecting readers. She is a Halifax psychiatrist who has written for a number of medical publications.

==== Dr. Dara's Diary ====
Written by Dara Behroozi, a physician in Vancouver, Dr. Dara's Diary chronicles the adventures of the doctor in his office, through a wide variety of subjects ranging from interactions with his patients, to the happenings of his family life, to his experiences boating. Behroozi's humour often places a certain spin on his practise, and his writing style often allows the reader to laugh along while becoming a part of it. Dr. Dara's Diary always follows a five-section structure, beginning with "Monday", the first day of the work week, to "Friday", the day before the weekend. He always ends his articles with the phrase: "Have a(n) [adjective] week".

==== Impatient Patient ====
Claire Moran contributes to Stitches for the article Impatient Patient. As a "self-confessed hypochondriac", Moran writes on general issues such as children, disease (humorously), and on one occasion, predictions of the year 2003. As her article's title confirms, Moran is a patient, not a doctor.

==== Red Tape ====
Written by Steve Kaladeen, a physician in an Ontario hospital, Red Tape follows a fictitious version of his own self.

==== The Mighty MacRuaraidh ====
Introduced in January 2004, Alistair Munro writes about the (often cocky) adventures of MacRuaraidh. Pronounced "MacRorie", this student of a six-year undergraduate course (Medical school) "incorporated every Celtic gene in existence into his personal appearance". Following MacRuaraidh's adventures, we see the author's take on a student who clearly shouldn't have made it through medical school, but did.

==== The Money Doctor ====
A relatively new column written by Francis D'Andrade, The Money Doctor focuses on a humorous take on financial situations, and often offers lighthearted advice for the common doctor. Although suggested by the column's name, D'Andrade is not a physician. Not to be confused of course with Ireland's Money Doctor, John Lowe - an authorised financial adviser and former banker whose best selling book "The Money Doctor Finance Annual 2010" is the 5th edition of the book.

== Stitches for Patients ==
First published in November/December 2005, Stitches for Patients is a supplement to the already popular Stitches: The Journal of Medical Humour.

== Stitches Explorers Club ==
Through the magazine, medial conferences were arranged in warm countries, during the winter. These became very popular, and over 70 have been arranged in 31 different countries. The most ambitious was a two-year cruise around the world in the 74 ft Yawl "Stitches Explorer", skippered by publisher Dr. John Cocker. The conferences continue, under the name, MDTravel.ca
