= Canada World View =

Canadian magazine

Canada World View (ISSN 1491-4573) was a quarterly magazine published by the Canadian Department of Foreign Affairs and International Trade from 1998 until the spring of 2006. It described itself as providing "an overview of Canada's perspective on foreign policy issues and highlights the "Government of Canada's international initiatives and contributions." The magazine was published in French and English languages. The headquarters was in Ottawa, Ontario.
