= Downhome =

Newfoundland and Labrador magazine

- Cover of the November 2022 issue
- Categories: Regional magazine
- Frequency: Monthly
- First issue: 1988; 38 years ago
- Company: Downhome Inc.
- Country: Canada
- Based in: St. John's, Newfoundland and Labrador
- Language: English
- Website: www.downhomelife.com
- ISSN: 1717-6786
- OCLC: 1083332463

Downhome, formerly The Downhomer, is a magazine published by a company with the same name monthly in St. John's, Newfoundland and Labrador, Canada.

== History and profile ==
The magazine was started in 1988 with the name Downhomer Newspaper. It focuses on lifestyle in Newfoundland and Labrador, with columns like Notes From Home, Family & Friends, Discovery, Healthy Living, Food & Leisure and features submissions by its reader in the forms of stories, poems, photos or letters. It is the largest paid circulation magazine in Atlantic Canada and is #31 among all paid circulation magazines in Canada. More than 50,000 copies of the magazine are published each month and are distributed worldwide. The magazine started as a tabloid publication in the Greater Toronto Area.

To complement the magazine, there are also two Downhome stores, one located in St. John's and the other in Twillingate. The company also sells items worldwide via its website and runs fundraisers for organizations and schools selling subscriptions and goods.
