= 24 images =

Canadian film magazine

- Publisher: Revue 24 images
- Founded: 1979
- Country: Canada
- Based in: Montreal, Quebec
- Language: French
- Website: Official website
- ISSN: 0707-9389

24 images is a French-language film magazine published in Montreal, Quebec, Canada.

== History and profile ==
Founded in 1979 by Benoît Patar, 24 images changed editors in 1987, with Marie-Claude Loiselle and Claude Racine assuming control. Loiselle and Racine improved the stature of the publication, adding such writers as Philippe Gajan, Gérard Grugeau, Thierry Horguelin, Gilles Marsolais and André Roy. It was published on a monthly basis. In May 2007, the magazine launched its weekly webzine.

== See also ==
- Ciné-Bulles
- Séquences
- List of film periodicals
