= Say (magazine) =

Canadian Contemporary Indigenous Lifestyle Magazine

SAY Magazine is an Indigenous lifestyle magazine, publishing stories about Indigenous Peoples predominantly in North America. The magazine was started in 2002, and focuses on telling positive stories about Indigenous people, organizations, and communities. As a bi-monthly publication, it is published six times per year. SAY Magazine is a contemporary lifestyle publication that celebrates First Nations, Métis and Inuit ingenuity by sharing success stories and stories of resilience. It is a variety publication that covers multiple topic areas including business, education, culture and language, law and justice, arts and entertainment, sports and wellness, as well as grassroots community initiatives.

In addition to 4 seasonal issues, SAY Magazine publishes a post-secondary Indigenous Education Guide provided free of charge to secondary schools to help guide students in their higher education choices.

Leslie Lounsbury (d. 2018), Métis, founded SAY (Spirit of Aboriginal Youth) Magazine in 2002. She was originally from Wabowden, Manitoba.
