= Hunter and Cook =

Defunct Canadian magazine

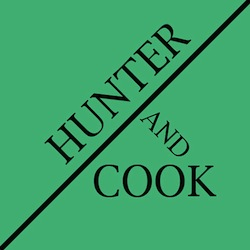
- Categories: Art magazine
- Frequency: Tri-annual
- Founder: Tony Romano, Jay Isaac
- Founded: 2008
- Final issue Number: 2011; 10
- Country: Canada
- Based in: Toronto, Ontario
- Website: www.hunterandcook.com

Hunter and Cook was a Toronto-based art and culture magazine. It was founded in 2008, and published three times a year until 2011, for 10 issues total. Visual artists Tony Romano and Jay Isaac were the publishers. The magazine included in-depth articles and interviews with contemporary artists, as well as curated projects made specifically for the magazine by invited artists. The magazine was featured in Eye Weekly, and The Coast.
