= The Marketer =

British marketing magazine

The Marketer was a marketing magazine published ten times a year by Redactive Publishing Ltd. Both The Marketer and www.themarketer.co.uk were the official magazine and website of The Chartered Institute of Marketing. The Marketer aimed to offer in-depth analyses and practical guides to help marketers stay at the cutting edge of the profession, combining the Institute's academic expertise with marketers’ real-life experience to promote marketing as a core business function. It was distributed in several countries around the world including Britain, Australia, Ghana, China, Kenya, Malaysia, New Zealand, Poland, Singapore and Sri Lanka.

Its circulation from 1 July 2007 to 30 June 2008 was 36,755. Its monthly e-newsletter was sent out to 80,000 recipients.

In 2015 the magazine ceased publication and was replaced by another magazine, Catalyst.
