= Criteria: A Critical Review of the Arts =

Canadian feminist art periodical

Criteria
- Image retrieved from the second issue of the HERESIES magazine.
- Editor: Ardele Lister
- Associate Editors: Bill Jones Russell Keziere
- Managing Editors: David MacWilliam
- Contributing Editors: Vancouver: Avis Lang Rosenberg; New York: Richard Lorber
- Photographer: John Sherlock
- Categories: Art
- Frequency: Irregular; advertised as "Quarterly" but usually published twice a year
- Format: Print
- Publisher: Criteria Arts Society
- First issue: June 1974
- Country: Canada
- Based in: Vancouver, BC
- Language: English
- ISSN: 0382-5078

Criteria: A Critical Review of the Arts was a Canadian feminist art periodical published by the Criteria Arts Society in Vancouver, BC from June 1974 until Fall 1978.

== Content ==
The magazine has been described as:

"A well-established critical review of the arts, Criteria offers articles and essays on topics of concern to artists and the art community as a whole. Recent issues have included lengthy articles on women artists and the Canadian art world, and on performance and video art. In tabloid format, but printed on heavy paper, this title is highly recommended."

The magazine's content included "interviews with Robert Frank, Hermann Nitsch, Michael Snow, Dennis Wheeler, Joyce Wieland, as well as discussions of work by Jack Chambers and Judy Chicago, articles by Henry Lehman and Tom Sherman, and artist projects by Ian Wallace and Lawrence Weiner.

Criteria also published pieces on Canadian art criticism and feminist critiques of representation, as well as articles on funding arts and culture.
