= Auto Atlantic =

Automotive industry magazine

Cover of the July 2009 edition of Auto Atlantic

Auto Atlantic is an Atlantic Canada-based automotive industry magazine.

== History and profile ==
Auto Atlantic magazine is based in Halifax, Nova Scotia, Canada. Published six times per year, and distributed to 8000 subscribers mainly in the four Atlantic provinces (with additional distribution to the rest of Canada and the United States. Auto Atlantic is owned and published by Alfers Advertising and Publishing Inc. The company is headed by Robert Alfers, who founded the magazine in 2002.

The magazine's editorial serves all the segments of the automotive industries audience in Atlantic Canada - from installers to jobbers, garages, retailers, auto recyclers, car and truck dealers, etc. Contributing writers are experienced and very well respected in their field. Auto Atlantic publishes a wide variety of subjects that cover popular interests from local, regional, national and international stages. However the main focus of the publication has always been to inform, and assist, the business owner, manager or mechanic.

== See also ==
- Media in Canada
