= Natural Life (magazine) =

Canadian magazine

- Categories: Lifestyle magazine
- Frequency: Triannual
- Publisher: The Alternate Press
- Founder: Rolf Priesnitz
- Founded: 1976
- Company: Life Media
- Country: Canada
- Based in: Toronto
- Website: Natural Life
- ISSN: 0701-8002
- OCLC: 262204194

Natural Life is a Canadian magazine, founded in 1976 by Rolf Priesnitz. It is owned by Life Media, an independent Toronto-based book and magazine publishing company owned by Wendy Priesnitz who is the magazine's editor. The magazine is published by the Alternate Press three or four times a year. It was formerly published on a bimonthly basis. The website of the magazine was started in 1994. It has won awards for its balanced reporting of environmental issues and published its 30th anniversary issue in November 2006.

As one of the first Canadian sustainable lifestyles magazines, it pioneered the merging of content in a holistic manner - with each issue including articles on organic gardening, renewable energy, green homes, natural health, sustainable business, eco-tourism, homeschooling and natural parenting. In the late 1970s and early 1980s, it published a U.S. edition and editions for various parts of Canada. It was relaunched in 1991 as one international edition and is now on the newsstands throughout North America and has readers in over 20 countries.

It has been published on FSC-certified matte coated stock since 2005.

The Natural Life website features over 2,000 pages of free content from the past 14 years. The articles are indexed by subject and fully searchable by keyword, making the site a popular reference tool.
