= Photosho =

- Editor: Mike Barnes
- Categories: Photography magazine
- Frequency: Biannual
- Publisher: Light Leaks Press
- First issue: March 2007
- Country: Canada
- Based in: Ottawa
- Language: English
- Website: www.photosho.ca
- ISSN: 1913-0511

Photosho (ISSN 1913-0511) was a Canadian magazine that exhibits the photography of Canadian photographers and explores their world. The magazine is published biannually, in September and in April. Each issue contains a theme, and all Canadian photographers are offered a chance to submit an image for consideration in their printed exhibit. Also contained in each issue are several "shocased" artists from across Canada, as well as articles on the culture of Canadian photographers. The magazine is headquartered in Ottawa.
