= Mehfil Magazine =

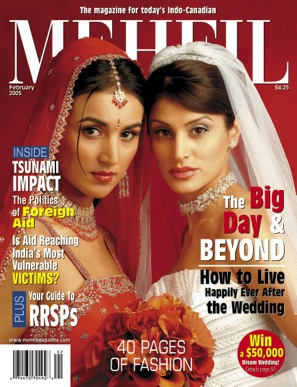
- Mehfil Magazine February 2005
- Categories: Lifestyle magazine
- Frequency: 9 issues per year
- Circulation: 40,000
- Publisher: Rana Vig
- Founded: 1993
- Final issue: 2010
- Company: Vig Publications Inc.
- Country: Canada
- Language: English
- Website: mehfilmagazine.com

Mehfil Magazine was a Canadian-based South Asian lifestyle magazine, launched in 1993 by brothers Rana and Minto Vig. Their idea was to produce a periodical that would not only showcase the community to its own, but also provide a tool and a bridge to foster better cross-cultural harmony and understanding. The word "Mehfil" means "a gathering". During its run, Mehfil Magazine featured the South Asian community's leading business men and women, writers, artists, social workers, law enforcement, politicians and students. It also tackled some of the South Asian community's social and political issues, including the Air India bombing, sexual abuse, arranged marriages, health concerns such as diabetes, the plight of seniors, as well as the cultural challenges of a new generation trying to integrate. The magazine ceased publication in 2010.

== Notable contributors ==
Rick Hansen, Guest columnist Mehfil Magazine April/May 1998
Peter C. Newman, Guest columnist Mehfil Magazine Aug/Sept 1997
John Peter Bell, Guest columnist Mehfil Magazine July 1997
Ray Perrault, Guest columnist Mehfil Magazine June 1997
Greg Douglas, The Vancouver Sun, Guest columnist Mehfil Magazine Dec 1997

== RBC Mehfil Magazine Awards of Excellence ==
In 2009 Mehfil Magazine held a black tie gala dinner event at Vancouver's Waterfront Fairmont Hotel. CBC's Peter Mansbridge was the keynote speaker.

In 2010 Mehfil Magazine held its second gala dinner event where Montreal based comedian Sugar Sammy was the evenings emcee.

== 100 Year Journey ==
In 2014 Rana Vig launched The 100 Year Journey - a community project committed to preserving the stories of the South Asian pioneers that helped to build Canada. A 150-page book of the same name was released on 29 November 2014 at a sold out black tie gala where 500 ‘movers & shakers’ of the community gathered to be part of an historic evening. Among the attendees were British Columbia Premier Christy Clark and Federal senior cabinet Minister Jason Kenney who applauded the efforts of this unique inaugural publication and event.

== Community work ==
In 2009 Rana Vig and his brother Minto established the Mehfil Magazine Endowed Journalism Award at Kwantlen Polytechnic University. Committed to inspiring future journalists to reach their potential, the Mehfil Magazine Endowment was created to encourage discussion about what role or significance, if any, ethnicity and cultural background should have in contemporary journalism. The endowment, which started at $40,000,^{9} has grown to $100,000 through various contributions made by the magazine and by Rana Vig.
