= Advisor's Edge =

Canadian magazine

- Categories: Finance, investments, tax, estate planning, financial services
- Frequency: Bi-monthly
- Format: Magazine
- Circulation: 33,500
- Publisher: Newcom Media Inc.
- Founded: 1998; 28 years ago
- Country: Canada
- Language: English
- Website: advisor.ca
- ISSN: 1490-814X
- OCLC: 300286394

Advisor's Edge is a Canadian magazine for client-facing financial advisors that is published by Newcom Media.

In 2016, Advisor's Edge published six issues. Its website, Advisor.ca, is updated each business day.

== History and profile ==
Advisor's Edge was founded in June 1998 by Maclean Hunter Publishing, which was part of Rogers Media, a subsidiary of Rogers Communications Inc. In September 2016, Rogers Media announced it was divesting all its business-to-business publications. On December 1, 2016, Advisor's Edge was acquired by Montreal-based Transcontinental Media. On September 19, 2019, Advisor's Edge and two other Transcontinental magazines were acquired by Toronto-based Newcome Media.

The readership of Advisor's Edge includes more than 33,500 client-facing investment and financial advisors. Conseiller, sister magazine of Advisor's Edge, reaches francophone financial advisors in Quebec. Conseiller was started in 2000.

== Awards ==
Advisor's Edge has won the following recent awards:

- Chartered Financial Analyst (CFA) Society Toronto Publication of the Year (2017)
- CFA Society Toronto Spirit of the Future of Finance Award (2017)
- Portfolio Management Association of Canada Award for Excellence in Investment Journalism (2017)
- Gold, Best In-House Cover, Canadian Business Media Awards (2016)
- Silver, Best Professional Article, Canadian Business Media Awards (2016)
