= Uppercase (magazine) =

Canadian craft, fashion, illustration, and design journal

Uppercase magazine
- Publisher: Janine Vangool
- First issue: June 2009
- Country: Canada
- Based in: Calgary, Alberta
- Language: English
- Website: www.uppercasemagazine.com

Uppercase magazine is a quarterly craft, fashion, illustration, and design journal published by Janine Vangool in Calgary, Alberta. The first issue was released in June 2009, and included articles about the history of the screw, Heini Koskinen’s fashion design, Blanca Gomez's illustrations, and Karyn Valino's Toronto crafting business The Workroom.

== Book publishing ==
In addition to the magazine, Uppercase publishes books about specific designers and illustrators. Publications include:

- The Shatner Show (2007)
- The Suitcase Series Volume 1: Camilla Engman
- The Elegant Cockroach by Martin & Augustine (October 2010)
- Work/Life 2: the UPPERCASE directory of international illustration (February 2011)
- A Collection a Day by Lisa Congdon (March 2011)
- The Suitcase Series Volume 2: Dottie Angel (August 2011)

=== Work/Life ===
Uppercase published two books, Work/Life and Work/Life 2, which act as databases for illustrators. Submissions are chosen by a juried process. The books include portfolio samples, interviews, and contact details. A companion iPhone app directs users to the individual illustrators' portfolio websites.
