= Ciné-Bulles =

Canadian French-language film magazine

Ciné-Bulles is a quarterly French-language film magazine published in Montreal, Quebec, Canada, by the Association des cinémas parallèles du Québec, an association of Quebec independent theatre operators.

== History and profile ==
Ciné-Bulles has been published since 1982. The magazine was started as a bimonthly magazine. It is devoted in large part to Quebec cinema.

== See also ==
- Séquences
- 24 images
