= Teenage Survival Handbook =

US teen magazine

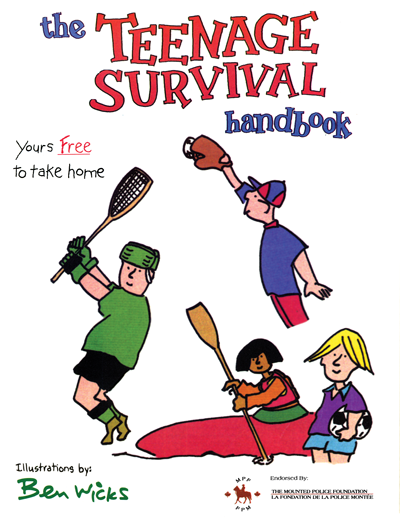
- Ben Wicks (1929- 2000) illustrated Teenage Survival Handbook cover.
- Editor: Toni Ziganash
- Categories: Teen
- Frequency: Annual
- Founded: 1990
- Company: Regional Maple Leaf Communications
- Country: United States, Canada
- Language: English
- Website: teenagesurvival.com

Teenage Survival (The Teenage Survival Handbook) is an English-language magazine published annually by Regional Maple Leaf Communications Inc. It was first published in 1990 and is aimed at young teens. It deals with issues pertaining to puberty and growing up. Some schools in US and Canada use the book as an extra curriculum activity. The Teenage Survival Handbook has been endorsed by RCMP Foundation since 1999 and was formerly illustrated by Ben Wicks from 1996 - 2000. After his death, RMC created "The Ben Wicks Award" in his honor and each year, up-and coming artists from Canada and the US entered the contest for a chance to win the right to illustrate the book and collect the $10,000 prize.

In 2010, RMC chose a former Ben Wicks Award Winner for Elementary Safety Book, Canadian artist Bob Hahn, to create a unique set of alien characters for the publication and the new accompanying website teenagesurvival.com. TeenageSurvival.com also features "Ask Andy", an advice forum modeled after the original "Dear Andy" column of the publication. Teens write to Andy for advice and some of the questions and answers are also featured in a series of video cartoons on the YouTube channel AskAndyRMC.

Former Ben Wicks Award Winners and Illustrators for the Teenage Survival Handbook

1. 2002 - Tyler Schroeder (Vancouver, BC)
2. 2003 - Brianne Drouhard (Othello, WA)
3. 2004 - Henry Fong (Montreal, QC)
4. 2005 - Greg Moran (Victoria, BC)
5. 2006 - Aaron "Given" Nauss (Halifax, NS)
6. 2007 - Alison Acton (Ottawa, ON)
7. 2008 - Raphael Pirard (Kan J) (Embrum, ON)
8. 2009 - Ingrid Mesquita (Toronto, ON)
9. 2010 - Allison Preswick (Vancouver, BC)
