= Ontario Out of Doors =

Canadian periodical

Ontario OUT of DOORS
- Editor-in-Chief: Ray Blades
- Categories: Outdoors magazine
- Frequency: 8 issues per year
- First issue: 1967 as Ontario Fisherman and Hunter; 1977 as Ontario Out of Doors
- Company: Ontario Federation of Anglers and Hunters
- Country: Canada
- Based in: Peterborough, Ontario
- Language: English
- Website: http://www.oodmag.com/
- ISSN: 0707-3178

Ontario OUT of DOORS (OOD) is a Canadian magazine focusing on recreational hunting, fishing and the outdoors in the province of Ontario. OOD is published 8 times per year and is owned by the Ontario Federation of Anglers and Hunters (OFAH). Ontario Out of Doors publishes articles on fishing and hunting in Ontario, including information on locations, techniques and products.

== History ==
OOD was founded in 1967 under the title Ontario Fisherman and Hunter. In 1977, the magazine was renamed to its current title. In 1985, OOD was acquired by MacLean-Hunter Limited. Rogers Publishing took over the magazine in 1994 when it bought MacLean-Hunter. In 2009, the OFAH bought the magazine from Rogers.

== Departments ==
- From the Editor
- Your Forum
- The Opener
  - News
  - DIY
  - Tips
  - Gear
  - Memory Bank (reader-submitted photos memorializing their experiences in the outdoors, entered for a chance to win a prize)
  - Q&A
  - Cooking
- Open Range
- Fishing Columns
- Hunting Columns
- Features
- Travel
- Marketplace (classifieds)
- My Outdoors (humour)

== Online ==
Ontario Out of Doors is available in print and in an enhanced digital version, featuring links to related videos, podcasts, and photo galleries.

OOD hosts an online forum which receives hundreds of thousands of page views monthly.
