= Siren (magazine) =

Canadian lesbian magazine

- Frequency: Bimonthly
- Publisher: More sex please! Press
- Founded: 1995
- Final issue: 2004
- Based in: Toronto, Ontario
- ISSN: 1205-6251
- OCLC: 36492683

Siren was a bimonthly Canadian magazine, published in Toronto, Ontario, for the city's lesbian community.

== History and profile ==
The magazine was launched in 1995 by a women's collective of volunteers. Its popularity increased in late 1996, around the time the lesbian monthly magazine Quota ceased publication. It underwent a controversial editorial revamp in 2002, ending its association with its regular contributors in favour of a more freelance story and contribution structure. The magazine was quoted in a discussion paper released by the Ontario Human Rights Commission about extending rights for transsexuals. One of the columns that appeared regularly in the magazine was titled "Dykes n' tykes".

Noted contributors to the magazine included Sheila Cavanagh, Debra Anderson, and Billie Jo Newman.

The magazine ceased publication in 2004 due to financial problems.
