= Regional Maple Leaf Communications =

Canadian publishing company

- Parent company: Regional Maple Leaf Communications Inc.
- Status: Active
- Founded: 1977
- Founder: R.L. Heath
- Headquarters location: 10213 111 Street NW; Edmonton, Alberta; T5K 2V6
- Distribution: Canada
- Key people: Toni Ziganash (editor)
- Publication types: Magazines, websites, and iPad apps
- Nonfiction topics: Children's awareness
- Official website: regionalmapleleaf.com

Regional Maple Leaf Communications Inc (RMC) is a Canadian publishing company located in Edmonton, Alberta. The company specializes in community interest children's magazines distributed free of charge in select communities across Canada. RMC's five major annual publications are "The Elementary Safety Book for Children", " Drug Facts for Young People", "The Teenage Survival Handbook", "Green Planet for Kids", and "The Children's Book of Celebrations".

Notable artists of RMC publications include Ben Wicks and Bob Hahn. Managing Editor is Toni Ziganash since 1979.

== History ==
The company was founded in 1977 by R.L. Heath as Regional Press Ltd. A second company Maple Leaf Press Ltd. was established in 1980 and the two companies were amalgamated as Regional Maple Leaf Communications Inc. in 1987. Regional Maple Leaf Communications is a member of Edmonton Chamber of Commerce since February 1988.

In 1987, RMC was nominated for both the Canadian and the Alberta Solicitor General's Award for Crime prevention and took home the Alberta Award. The Ontario Block Parent Association produced a video for school demonstrations based on the story of "Susan and the Secret Code" taken from the Elementary Safety Book for Children. Gary & Sharon Rosenfeldt, founders of Victims of Violence, partnered with Regional Maple Leaf Communications to publish an annual missing children's poster which is printed on the inside cover of the Elementary Safety Book for Children. In 1986, RMC received a commendation from Victims of Violence for their support in efforts to reduce crimes against children.

RCMP Foundation has reviewed and endorsed three of RMC's publications since 1999, "The Elementary Safety Book For Children", "Drug Facts for Young People" and "The Teenage Survival Handbook". Green Planet for Kids and all four accompanying websites (i.e. http://drugfacts4youngpeople.com/, http://elementarysafety.com/, http://greenplanet4kids.com/, and http://teenagesurvival.com/) were included in the endorsement as of April 1, 2013. RCMP Foundation also has RMC in its partner's list.

In 1996 cartoonist Ben Wicks began illustrating the cartoons for The Elementary Safety Book for Children, Drug Facts for Young People and The Teenage Survival Handbook until his death in 2001. After consulting with his wife, Doreen Wicks, RMC established "The Ben WIcks Award", an opportunity for aspiring artists to compete for the opportunity to illustrate one of the books and receive $10,000. Twenty-seven artists were chosen over the years until 2010 when it was retired for the company to move on to the development of accompanying websites to their publications in order to give access to everyone.

A previous Ben Wicks Award winner, Bob Hahn, was especially commissioned to develop characters for GreenPlanet4Kids.com. After finishing that project he was hired by RMC full-time to also create specific characters for DrugFacts4YoungPeople.com, ElementarySafety.com and TeenageSurvival.com.

== Publications ==
The Elementary Safety Book for Children covers playing safely, geared to children under the age of 10. The animal characters are created by Bob Hahn, a 2008 Ben Wicks Award winner. The accompanying website elementarysafety.com features printable colouring pages. An accompanying iPad app is also available.

Drug Facts for Young People was designed for children age 10 and up and focuses on how to make positive decisions regarding drugs and alcohol. The canine characters created by artist Bob Hahn learn how to deal with issues like peer pressure, and choosing role models. The accompanying website drugfacts4youngpeople.com hosted RMC's first $5000 contest (split between the winner and the school of their choice) where students make a 30 second to 5 minute YouTube video that reflects a positive message for youth.

The Teenage Survival Handbook is a guide for parents and teens about puberty. Bob Hahn's alien characters humorously address serious and sometimes uncomfortable subject matters. The accompanying website teenageSurvival.com also features an "Ask Andy" section, where Andy the Extraterrestrial host answers incoming real questions.

Green Planet for Kids is about ways that adults and children can make a difference for the environment. Bob Hahn created "The Eco Family", a family of dinosaur characters who want to learn how to become environmentally friendly. The accompanying website greenplanet4kids.com features free e-postcards and Eco Family blog. Accompanying iPad app has been listed among top five green apps.

The Children's Book of Celebration is a multicultural colouring and activity book which highlights celebrations of different ethnic groups and was discontinued after the 2013 edition. The publication explains about each of the occasions included, the day that they are celebrated and a puzzle, game or craft to accompany it. The characters are doll-like figures designed by artist Cecilia Camet.

== See also ==
- The Teenage Survival Handbook
