= Eleonora Dimakos =

Canadian actor, model and journalist

Eleonora Hellen Nora Dimakos is a female Greek Canadian model, actress, journalist, makeup artist, esthetician, and spa manager from Toronto, Ontario.

== Early life ==
Dimakos displayed talent in the arts from a young age. She was entered into the annual Royal Canadian Legion Remembrance Day Poster competition Intermediate category for grades 7-9 where she placed first in Branch, Zone, and District D levels. As a result of her achievements, her color poster was published in The Toronto Sun centerfold during Poppy Week alongside the John McCrae poem In Flanders Fields. Dimakos was recognized for her outstanding contribution to education by The Board of Education for the City of York and was awarded the Board's Award of Merit Pin.

== Career ==
=== Makeup and esthetics ===
In 2003 Dimakos founded eleonora Makeup artistry which operated under the acronym eMa. Her company consisted of professionally applied makeup that served the Greater Toronto Area. That year, she also joined the cosmetics department of retail pharmacy chain Shoppers Drug Mart. Her career with the company lasted for 13 years, spanned 3 locations, and saw her as a Certified Beauty Advisor, Cosmetic Manager, and Beauty Boutique Manager. After leaving Shoppers Drug Mart in 2016, Dimakos revamped her company, expanded services, and dropped all references to eleonora Makeup artistry and eMa. It now operates under its slogan, ACE in FACE.

=== Journalism ===
Dimakos was the contributing lifestyle editor and beauty columnist for Sir John Magazine as La Chic Fashionista in 2007. Her column focused on beauty, fashion, makeup, skin care, health and wellness. She was also the face of the magazine and appeared on the cover of the online magazine's May and November 2007 issues.

Dimakos' expertise as La Chic Fashionista stemmed from her past experience in the news media as Entertainment Anchor and Live-Eye Reporter for First Local's Mississauga Edition broadcast on Rogers Television, her involvement in several indie films and music videos as both an actress and makeup artist, and her career as a beauty, fashion, and lifestyle model.
