= Canadian Living =

Canadian monthly magazine

- Categories: Lifestyle
- Frequency: Monthly
- Publisher: Jacqueline Howe
- Total circulation: 521,169 (June 2013)
- First issue: December 1975
- Company: TVA Group
- Country: Canada
- Based in: Toronto
- Language: English
- Website: canadianliving.com
- ISSN: 0382-4624

Canadian Living is a monthly Canadian lifestyle magazine, which publishes articles relating to food, fashion, crafts, and health and family advice.

== History and profile ==
The magazine was created by Clem Compton-Smith and his business partner, Margaret Smeeth, in 1975, with the financial backing of Labatt's. They and a tiny staff operated out of the manse of a church in Mississauga, Ontario. Canadian Living began as a half-million circulation title sold exclusively through supermarkets; the gimmick was a split run that enabled the magazine to devote a full page in each issue to each supermarket chain that carried it. The first issue appeared in December, 1975, and sold for 25 cents. The cover showed a male and a female hand about to snap a wishbone; the female hand belonged to Smeeth (billed in the magazine as editor Margaret Kelly), who was at the photo session and was not impressed by the hand of the female model who had been hired for the occasion.

Compton-Smith's vision was of a Canadian-centric, general-interest magazine that would appeal to men and to women. To that end, along with the fashion and cooking sections that later became its mainstay, Canadian Living offered travel articles, wine-making tips and a woodworking column. While the third issue was at press, Labatt's acquired ownership of the magazine. A new publisher, Ken Larone, was parachuted in to replace Compton-Smith, who remained on staff until late 1976.

The magazine was subsequently acquired by Telemedia, which also owned a French language counterpart, Coup de pouce. Canadian Living was acquired by Transcontinental in 2000. In 2014, the magazines were sold to the TVA Group subsidiary of Quebecor Media.

The magazine has also produced television series for broadcast on Canadian television channels such as Slice, HGTV, Food Network, and CBC Television.

Canadian Living is partnered with the Fast-moving consumer goods awards program Best New Product Awards and writes an annual feature on the winners of each year.

The circulation of Canadian Living in 2018 was 340,597 copies with a readership of 3,087,00 readers.

In 2019, a marketing firm took a survey of 17,000 Canadian shoppers, and Canadian Living was voted as the "most trusted" magazine in Canada.
