= Canadian Parliamentary Review =

Publication of the Canadian Region of the Commonwealth Parliamentary Association

The Canadian Parliamentary Review is a quarterly publication of the Canadian Region of the Commonwealth Parliamentary Association. The publication began as a newsletter known as the Canadian Regional Review in 1978 with a provisional six-member editorial board. Renamed in 1980, it adopted a format change under its first editor, Gary Levy. The current editor is Will Stos.

The stated objective of the journal is "to inform Canadian legislators about activities of the federal, provincial and territorial branches of the Canadian Region of the Commonwealth Parliamentary Association and to promote the study of and interest in Canadian parliamentary institutions." It publishes articles by and about present and former legislators as well as legislative staff, professors, journalists and others interested in legislative institutions. The Canadian Parliamentary Review is distributed to all federal, provincial and territorial legislators in Canada and by subscription to interested individuals and institutions in Canada, the United States and throughout the Commonwealth. The Review is also published in a separate French language edition known as La Revue parlementaire canadienne. All back issues are available on the web.
