= Wasted Youth (magazine) =

Canadian teen punk rock magazine

Wasted Youth is a Canadian magazine created for young punk rock teens. The first issue was published in November 2004 in black and white and then republished and distributed nationwide in colour in June 2005. The publisher is Toronto-based company Hotsos Studio.

Topics include music and band reviews (usually focusing on punk, emo, goth and alternative rock), local skateboarding (including street maps or park guides) and art and tattoos. Each issue includes a music sampler CD produced by the magazine featuring indie Canadian punk rock bands. Wasted Youth hosts a number of concerts in Toronto, Ontario, Montreal, Quebec and Vancouver, British Columbia.
