= Outdoor Canada =

Canada's national fishing and hunting magazine

Outdoor Magazine
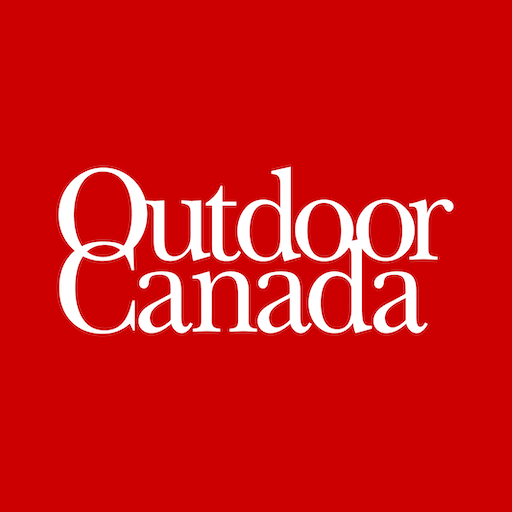
- Editor-in-Chief & Brand Manager: Patrick Walsh
- Fishing Editor: Gord Pyzer
- Hunting Editor: Ken Bailey
- Categories: Fishing, hunting and conservation
- Frequency: Six issues a year
- Circulation: 1.548 million (PMB 2010)
- Paid circulation: 90,000 (ABC)
- Founded: 1972
- Company: Outdoor Group Media (publisher Mark Yelic)
- Country: Canada
- Based in: Toronto, Ontario
- Language: English
- Website: https://www.outdoorcanada.ca

Outdoor Canada is Canada's national fishing and hunting magazine, in print since 1972. Its content includes how-to articles, buyer's guides, profiles, travelogues, reports, and analyses.

The magazine documents wildlife management, conservation, and Canada's heritage sports. The purpose of Outdoor Canada and Outdoor Canada West is to encourage fishermen, anglers, and hunters to improve their skills and broaden their knowledge of the outdoors by presenting fishing and hunting hotspots and roundups of new gear. Outdoor Canada is published six times a year.

In 2005, 2011, and 2012, Outdoor Canada was named Magazine of the Year (50,000 to 149,999 circulation category) by the Canadian Society of Magazine Editors, while editor-in-chief Patrick Walsh was also named Editor of the Year for those same years.

== History ==
Outdoor Canada debuted in 1972 as a Canadian source for stories about fishing, hunting, conservation, hiking, camping, boating, skiing, photography, parks, wildlife, and more. The first issue included a piece on Ontario steel heading by outdoors writer John Power, a look at the Yukon's new Kluane National Park, and a story about Edmund Hillary canoeing through the wilds of Quebec, as well as moose recipes and book reviews alongside articles on cross-country skiing, winter survival, snowmobiling, motor homes, and boating. Outdoor Canada now focuses primarily on fishing, hunting, and conservation.

The magazine was founded by Ron and Sheila Kaighin. The couple sold their home in North Vancouver and camped their way across Canada before launching the magazine from Toronto. Sheila served as editor, taking over in 1973 from earlier recruits Mike Irving and Graeme Matheson, while Ron maintained the role of publisher.

The couple sold the magazine to the Canadian National Sportsmen's Shows in 1985. They both stayed on in their respective roles for another year.

Soon after buying Outdoor Canada from the Canadian National Sportsmen's Shows in 1998, publisher Avid Media made a decision to no longer cover all outdoor pursuits. Instead, the magazine would focus solely on angling, hunting, and related conservation issues.

Patrick Walsh became the editor in 2000 (James Little went on to edit Explore magazine [1] until late 2012). The magazine is tailored to males between the ages of 18 and 49 and has a paid circulation of approximately 90,000. In 2004, Outdoor Canada was purchased, along with the other three magazines belonging to Avid Media, by Transcontinental Media G.P. Transcontinental subsequently sold the magazine in September 2009 (along with its sister title, Canadian Home Workshop magazine) to Quarto Communications Inc., later to become Cottage Life Media, a division of Blue Ant Media Partnership. In 2015, British Columbia-based Outdoor Group Media [2] obtained a 50% stake in the magazine, then gained full control in 2018. The magazine continues to be published out of Toronto.

Outdoor Canada has received honors over the years, including 30 National Magazine Awards (NMA).

=== Timeline ===
- In 1972, the 64-page first issue arrived in November with a print run of 15,000 copies. The cover price was 50 cents.
- In 1974, when venerable Rod & Gun magazine folded, Outdoor Canada honored its 19,000 subscriptions. The magazine also debuted the first of seven logo changes, which continued to evolve in 1975, 1976, 1981, 1987, and 1994. The last logo change is the one currently in use today, minus the goose.
- The first Fishing Annual was published in 1981, along with the article by David Dehaas, “The Death That Rains from the Sky.” The article caught the attention of readers with its apocalyptic tone: “Experts in both Canada and the U.S. agree that acid rain will continue to increase for at least the next 20 years,” wrote Dehaas. While his sources may have been pessimistic, the problems of acid rain are still applicable.
- In 1982, Bryan Berriault and Teddi Brown, who in 1986 became the new editors of the magazine, wrote Outdoor Canada’s first story on the then-emerging concept of catch-and-release fishing. Though it has yet to become law in the way the authors predicted, the practice has been embraced by anglers across the country. Not only is it believed that half the fish now caught are let go, but numerous lodges have voluntarily adopted the policy in an effort to preserve trophy fishing in their respective areas.
- The first Hunting Annual was published in 1987. That same year, an exposé was printed on the issue of the illegal trade in animal parts. Writer Don Cowan found wildlife officials turned a blind eye to the practice, with some advocating the legalization of the trade, Cowan wrote. Five years later, Canada passed the Wild Animal and Plant Protection Act, and the black market for bear organs, as well as for deer and elk antler velvet, waned considerably.
- In 1993, Teddi Brown brought attention to the fact that Canada didn't have a national fishing week [5], even though fishing is part of Canada's national heritage and generates billions of dollars for the economy. After seven years of development, the Canadian National Sportfishing Foundation [6] and its partners created National Fishing Week. The event includes hundreds of fishing-related events from coast to coast.
- In 1995, Editor Teddi Brown died of cancer at the age of 62.

=== Outdoor Writers of Canada Awards ===
Outdoor Canada has awards from the Outdoor Writers of Canada, including (as of 2018): 30 1st place finishes; 22 second-place positions; and 23 third-place awards.

=== Outdoor Writers Association of America Awards ===
The magazine has taken home two first-place wins and two second-place wins from the Outdoor Writers Associations of America.

=== Canadian Society of Magazine Editors ===
The Canadian Society of Magazine Editors has awarded Outdoor Canada its Magazine of the Year distinction three times (in 2005, 2011, and 2012), while also honoring EIC Patrick Walsh as Editor of the Year three times. The magazine has also earned CSME's Jim Cormier Award for Display Writing three times and Best Front-of-the-Book honors once.
