= Elementary Safety Book =

- Ms.: Toni Ziganash
- Categories: Children between the ages of 6 and 10
- Frequency: Annual
- Founded: 1985
- Company: Regional Maple leaf Communications Inc
- Country: United States, Canada
- Language: English
- Website: elementarysafety.com

Elementary Safety (The Elementary Safety Book for Children) is an English-language magazine published annually by Regional Maple Leaf Communications Inc. It was first published in 1985 and is aimed at children between the ages of six and ten. It deals with all issues pertaining to children safety. The Elementary Safety Book for Children has been endorsed by RCMP Foundation since 1999 and was formerly illustrated by Ben Wicks from 1996 - 2000. After his death, RMC created "The Ben Wicks Award" in his honor and each year, up-and coming artists from Canada and the US entered the contest for a chance to win the right to illustrate the book and collect the $10,000 prize.

In 2010, RMC chose a former Ben Wicks Award Winner for Elementary Safety Book, Canadian artist Bob Hahn, to create a unique set of animal characters for the publication and the new accompanying website elementarysafety.com. Elementarysafety.com also features safety related printable coloring pages.

Former Ben Wicks Award Winners and Illustrators for The Elementary Safety Book for Children

1. 2002 - Tanya Francis-Day (Olds, Alberta)
2. 2003 - Al Kang (London, ON)
3. 2004 - Gabriel Choquette (Orleans, ON)
4. 2005 - Stephen Downer (Bozeman, MT)
5. 2006 - Eric Peladeau (Ottawa, ON)
6. 2007 - Ryan Browne (Ottawa, ON)
7. 2008 - Bob Hahn (Brampton, ON)
8. 2009 - Clinton Baker (Toronto, ON)
9. 2010 - Nelson Dedos Garcia (Mexico)
