= Drug Facts for Young People =

Canadian teen magazine

- Editor: Toni Ziganash
- Categories: Young Teens
- Frequency: Annual
- Founded: 1986
- Company: Regional Maple Leaf Communications Inc
- Country: Canada
- Based in: Edmonton, Alberta
- Language: English
- Website: drugfacts4youngpeople.com

Drug Facts For Young People is an English-language magazine published annually by Regional Maple Leaf Communications Inc. It was first published in 1986 and is aimed at young teens. Drug Facts For Young People focuses on making young people aware of their own values, the influences of their peers and role models, and encourages them to make a positive choice regarding drugs such as alcohol. Some schools in US and Canada use the book as an extra curriculum activity. Drug Facts For Young People has been endorsed by the RCMP Foundation since 1999 and was formerly illustrated by Ben Wicks from 1996 - 2000. After his death, RMC created "The Ben Wicks Award" in his honor and each year, up-and coming artists from Canada and the US entered the contest for a chance to win the right to illustrate the book and collect the $10,000 prize.

In 2010, RMC chose a former Ben Wicks Award Winner for Elementary Safety Book, Canadian artist Bob Hahn, to create a unique set of animal characters for the publication and the new accompanying website drugfacts4youngpeople.com. Drugfacts4youngpeople.com hosts annual vids4kids contest, which is a five thousand dollars video contest with various drug prevention related topics each year.

Former Ben Wicks Award Winners and Illustrators for Drug Facts For Young People Book

1. 2002 - Mike Myhre (Fort St. John, BC)
2. 2003 - Rob Jones (Victoria, BC)
3. 2004 - June Um (Vancouver, BC)
4. 2005 - Jeff Epp (Harrow, ON)
5. 2006 - Ian Maclean (Calgary, AB)
6. 2007 - Rob Seddon (Kanata, ON)
7. 2008 - Rachel Loveless (Edmonton, AB)
8. 2009 - Lettie Lo (Oakville, ON)
9. 2010 - Agnes Wiguna (Toronto, ON)
