= Sir John (magazine) =

Sir John Magazine
- Editor-in-chief: Anthony P. Santelli
- Categories: News magazine
- Frequency: Monthly
- First issue: July 2007
- Company: Premiere Media Group, Inc.
- Country: Canada
- Language: English

Sir John Magazine was a monthly online magazine with articles that focused on Canadian politics, current world events, fashion, beauty, health, entertainment, technology, and culture. It was portrayed as an upscale and sophisticated type of magazine.

== History ==
Sir John Magazine was created by Anthony Santelli who is also the founder of Premiere Media Group, Inc.

Since 2002 Santelli had a magazine idea to present a publication for Canadians' interest in politics. His own interest in political issues inspired him to develop a mainstream magazine that would make politics entertaining, motivating, and compelling to its readers. After making the decision to put teaching aside, he embarked full-time on developing this new magazine. The magazine was first published in July 2007.

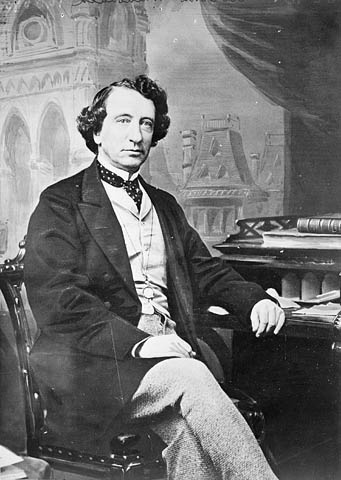
Sir John Macdonald 1st Prime Minister of Canada

The magazine was named after Sir John Alexander Macdonald, GCB, KCMG, PC, QC, DCL, LL.D, who was born on January 11, 1815, in Glasgow, Scotland, and who became the first Prime Minister of Canada, in 1867.

== Style ==
The subscription-based online magazine, Sir John, was mixing cover girls with Canadian and international political coverage to target men and women 25–55.

The magazine's motto was "Politics with Flair" and was comparable to the defunct US publication George that was started by John F. Kennedy Jr. which featured stars on its covers and entertaining but perceptive political coverage inside.

Every month inside of Sir John Magazine there was coverage of politics, fashion, entertainment, technology, and culture. In addition, there were discussion forums, and photo shoots accompanied by political based interviews of female cover models. In previous issues, models such as Eleonora Dimakos and Sabrina Heerema-Agostino appeared on the cover of the online magazine.

Special features included "From the Editor's Desk" by Anthony Santelli, "La Chic Fashionista" by Eleonora Dimakos, "In the Modern World" by Lucia Giardulli, and "The World According to James Bradford".

== Future ==
Premiere Media Group, Inc. had plans to produce a print version of Sir John Magazine to distribute nationally to major cities across Canada. Anthony Santelli expressed in an interview with The Chronicle Journal,

There is most definitely room for this magazine, as long as it's presented in a unique way and this is what sets it apart from Maclean's magazine.
