= Shameless (magazine) =

Canadian feminist magazine

- Cover of Winter 2022 issue
- Frequency: Triannual
- First issue: 2004
- Final issue: 2023
- Country: Canada
- Language: English
- Website: shamelessmag.com

Shameless was a Canadian magazine with a feminist and anti-oppressive practice perspective for girls and trans youth. It was published three times a year and also maintained a website featuring a blog, web stories and audio content. Shameless is a registered not-for-profit. It ran from 2004 to 2023.

== History and awards ==
Shameless was an independent Canadian voice for young women and trans youth. Its focus is broader than many teen magazines, packed with articles about arts, culture and current events, reflecting the diversity of their readers' interests and experiences. Shameless was founded in 2004 by Nicole Cohen and Melinda Mattos. In November 2023 it announced that it had ceased both print and online activities.

Shameless also ran a podcast, Shameless Talks, that can be found on their website and iTunes.

In June 2004, Shameless was named Best New Magazine by Toronto alt-weekly NOW and nominated for two Utne Independent Press Awards (Best New Title and Best Design). In 2005, Shameless won an Utne award for Best Personal Life Writing. The magazine was nominated again in 2006, for Lifestyle coverage. In 2005, cover story “Making The Cut” was nominated for a National Magazine Award.

== The blog ==
Shameless also hosted a blog, which was named Best Feminist Blog in Canada in February 2008 by the Canadian F-Word Blog Awards and shortlisted again in 2012. The site has also won Best Entertainment Blog. Frequent topics include representation of women and trans folks, youth, race and sexuality in mainstream culture, independent artists and musicians, pop culture, news and current events.
