= What If? (magazine) =

Canadian magazine

What If
- Managing Editor: Mike Leslie
- Categories: Arts & Entertainment
- Frequency: Quarterly
- First issue: February 2003
- Final issue: Fall 2010
- Country: Canada
- Based in: Guelph, Ontario
- Language: English

What If? Magazine (sometimes known as WI) was a Canadian magazine, that covered music, art, literature, film, writing and popular culture. Unlike celebrity-focused publications, WI's primary concentration was on Canadian up-and-coming artists with a heavy focus on youth (teen and tween) and young adult audiences. The publication was notable for their heavy encouragement and publishing of reader-created material.

== Cover art ==
The magazine features reader-made artwork on the cover, from paintings to drawings to photography.

== Content and Frequency ==
It published 4 issues each year (usually in March, June, September, and December) that are available on newsstands for approximately two months.

=== Note from the Editor ===
The article that opens the magazine comes from Mike Leslie, the managing editor, who discusses literature and writing techniques, but more generally focuses on literature and art as a rule. The whole section typically runs two to three pages long.

=== Reviews ===
There are several sections of reviews, rated in the style of European magazines by assessing in terms of number of stars (with 5 stars for the best review).

The sections are:

- "Books" typically features Canadian literature aimed at youth/teen and YA audiences.
- "Music" reviews major and independent album releases for each quarter, regardless of genre. There is also typically at least one interview or feature, often of the artist and/or band of one of the new music releases being reviewed or from a past review.

There are also several review pages online. This section is managed and contributed to by entertainment editor Chelsey Cosh.

The online review sections are:

- "Games" reviews current video game releases.
- "Movies" reviews new theatrical releases. This section is edited by entertainment editor Chelsey Cosh.

== Redesign ==
In Spring 2010, What If was redesigned and relaunched, changing the look and feel of the publication — increasing picture sizes and making a number of columns' word count shorter. The change was sponsored by the Government of Canada through the Canada Magazine Fund (CMF)of the Department of Canadian Heritage.

In Fall 2010, the magazine shut down losing any funds to be able to carry the magazine on any longer.

== Website ==
The magazine's website whatifmagazine.com provided users with regular content, unabridged versions of edited material from the magazine, breaking news, original audio/video programming, entertainment exclusives, and serves as an archive for past magazine interviews, columns and photos.
