= Transcontinental (company) =

Canadian media company

Transcontinental Inc.
- Trade name: TC Transcontinental
- Type: Public
- Traded as: TSX: TCL.A; TSX: TCL.B
- Industry: Printing, direct marketing, Publishing, Distribution
- Founded: 1976
- Founder: Rémi Marcoux, Claude Dubois and André Kingsley
- Headquarters: 1 Place Ville Marie, Montreal, Quebec, Canada
- Key people: Sam Bendavid
- Revenue: 2.7 billion (2025)
- Number of employees: 4,000 +
- Website: tc.tc

Transcontinental Inc., operating as TC Transcontinental, is a Montreal-based retail marketing services provider, as well as a commercial printing and specialty media company.

Transcontinental is publicly-traded on the Toronto Stock Exchange, and has over 4,000 employees—the majority of which are based in Canada.

== History ==
The company was founded in 1976 by Rémi Marcoux and partners Claude Dubois and André Kingsley as a flyer-printing business. It generated $2.9 million in revenue in its first year of operations. In 1978, the company was renamed GTC Transcontinental Group Ltd., and it established a Door-to-door flyer distribution division known as Publi-Home Distributors.

In 1979, the company entered the publishing industry after acquiring Les Affaires and SIC. It also purchased the Imprimerie Chartier (now Transcontinental Saint-Hyacinthe) printing plant. In 1984, the company went public on the Montreal Exchange, and later the Toronto Stock Exchange. Transcontinental subsequently performed a number of acquisitions over the decade that followed, including 20 Telemedia-owned community newspapers in the Montreal area, The Hockey News, and a number of commercial printing companies (including Southam Inc.'s plants and printing division), among others.

=== Purchase of Telemedia and expansion into Atlantic Canada ===
On January 29, 2000, GTC Transcontinental announced its acquisition of the publishing business of Telemedia for $150 million, including Canadian Living, Homemakers, and the Canadian editions of Elle and TV Guide. In 2002, Transcontinental acquired 12 newspapers and two printing plants in Atlantic Canada and Saskatchewan from CanWest Global for $255 million, in what was one of the company's largest transactions to date.

In 2003, after receiving the contract to print La Presse, the company established its new Transcontinental Métropolitain printing plant. In 2006, the company enters a segment offering strong growth potential in the publishing market by acquiring Chenelière Éducation, the leading publisher of French-language educational resources in Canada. In 2011, Transcontinental reached an agreement to exchange assets with the U.S. printer Quad/Graphics, acquiring six of its Canadian plants (dating back to its predecessor Quebecor World) and a prepress in Markham, Ontario, in exchange for Transcontinental's Mexican operations, and a stake in a black-and-white book printing operation owned by the company.

=== 2012–2016: More expansion ===
In 2012, Rémi Marcoux stepped down as chair of the board, and was succeeded by his daughter Isabelle Marcoux. In December 2013, Quebecor Media subsidiary Sun Media announced that it would sell 74 of its community newspapers in Quebec to Transcontinental in a deal valued at $75 million. The Competition Bureau approved the sale in May 2014, under the condition that Transcontinental divest 34 of its Quebec newspapers for competition reasons. In March 2014, Transcontinental acquired U.S.-based Capri Packaging to expand into the flexible packaging market. The company described it as a "new promising growth area", amidst softening revenue in advertising, and decreases in its core printing businesses. In November 2014, Transcontinental sold 15 of its consumer magazines, including Canadian Living and The Hockey News, to Quebecor's Groupe TVA for $55.5 million. Transcontinental also received a contract to print magazines and marketing materials for TVA through 2021.

=== Getting out of Atlantic Canada and the Prairies ===
In May 2016, Transcontinental sold its 13 newspapers in Saskatchewan to Star News Publishing of Alberta. As a result, a Transcontinental plant in Saskatoon was also shut down. On December 1, 2016, Transcontinental Media acquired Rogers Media's financial industry publications, including Advisor's Edge, Avantages, Benefits Canada, and Conseiller.

On April 13, 2017, Transcontinental announced that it had divested media assets in Atlantic Canada to SaltWire Network. On April 18, 2017, Transcontinental announced that it planned to place 93 of its remaining newspapers in Ontario and Quebec (including Montreal's Métro) for sale, in order to "contribute to the continued sustainability of local media and to foster greater connections with the advertisers and communities they serve", and to focus more on its educational publishing and specialty media operations. In April 2018, Transcontinental announced that it would acquire Coveris Americas for US$1.3 billion, its largest acquisition to-date, as part of an effort to bolster its flexible packaging business. Isabelle described the proposed purchase as one that would "[crystalize] our strategic shift toward flexible packaging and solidifies our commitment to profitable growth". The purchase would make Transcontinental the seventh-largest packaging company in North America.

=== Leadership changes ===
On September 19, 2019, Transcontinental divested its financial industry publications between Contex Media and Newcom Media. On December 9, 2021, Francois Olivier retires after 28 years with TC Transcontinental, the last 13 as President and Chief Executive Officer. On December 10, 2021, Peter Brues. A member of the Board of Directors of Transcontinental Inc. since 2018, succeeds him as President and Chief Executive Officer. On June 7, 2023, Thomas Morin was named TC Transcontinental's President and Chief Executive Officer. He previously served as President of TC Transcontinental Packaging, beginning in 2019, and has been a member of TC Transcontinental’s Executive Management Committee since then.

On April 6, 2026, Sam Bendavid was appointed as Chief Executive Officer, succeeding Thomas Morin.

== Packaging ==
From 2014 to 2026, TC Transcontinental operated a packaging business as part of its diversification strategy. The company entered the sector with the acquisition of Capri Packaging in 2014.

The division focused primarily on the production of flexible packaging—including bags, pouches, rollstocks, labels, die-cut lids, shrink films and advanced coatings—and expanded through multiple acquisitions to become one of the largest flexible packaging converters in North America, with operations in the United States, Canada, Guatemala, Ecuador, Colombia, the United Kingdom and New Zealand.

In March 2026, TC Transcontinental finalized a stock purchase agreement with ProAmpac Holdings Inc., resulting in the full divestiture of its packaging activities.

== Retail services and printing ==
TC Transcontinental is the largest commercial printing company in Canada, and one of the largest in North America.

In January 2016, the Toronto Star announced it would outsource its newspaper printing to Transcontinental with a five-year contract beginning in July 2016, and the contract has been extended to the end of 2027. The operations were shifted to its Vaughan plant.

This was followed in November 2017 by the announced closure of its Métropolitain plant, primarily due to the La Presse newspaper ceasing print and moving to a digital-only model.

In May 2019, Transcontinental announced that it would close its Brampton plant by the end of 2019.

In 2025, the Corporation acquired three canadian companies to expand its in-store marketing activities: Middleton Group in June, and Canva Group subsidiaries Mirazed Inc. and Intergraphics Decal Limited in August.

In April 2026, the company acquired Phipps Dickson Integria Group Inc., a company which provides production services for large‑format signage and displays, commercial printing, as well as specialized distribution.

=== Facilities ===
| Facility Name | Location | Country |
|---|---|---|
| Transcontinental Anjou | Montreal, QC | Canada |
| Transcontinental Aurora | Aurora, ON | Canada |
| Transcontinental Beauceville | Beauceville, QC | Canada |
| Transcontinental Boucherville | Boucherville, QC | Canada |
| Transcontinental Brampton | Brampton, ON | Canada |
| Transcontinental Calgary | Calgary, AB | Canada |
| Transcontinental Halifax | Halifax, NS | Canada |
| Transcontinental Winnipeg | Winnipeg, MB | Canada |
| Transcontinental Kirkland | Kirkland, QC | Canada |
| Transcontinental LaSalle | Lasalle, QC | Canada |
| Transcontinental Laval | Laval, QC | Canada |
| Transcontinental Saint-Hubert | Saint-Hubert, QC | Canada |
| Transcontinental Owen Sound | Owen Sound, ON | Canada |
| Transcontinental Paris | Paris, ON | Canada |
| Transcontinental Vancouver | Annacis Island Delta, BC | Canada |
| Transcontinental Vaughan | Vaughan, ON | Canada |
| Premedia Montreal | Montreal, QC | Canada |
| Premedia Toronto | Toronto, ON | Canada |

== Media & Education ==
TC Media Books is the leading Canadian French-language educational publishing group as well as a trade book publisher, the leader in the supplemental educational material market in Québec and the leading distributor of French-language specialized books in Canada.

TC Media Books publishes for all levels of instruction in print and digital formats, mainly under the Chenelière Éducation, Gaëtan Morin Éditeur, Beauchemin, Modulo, Graficor and Édisem brands.

TC Media Books is also being active in general interest publishing mainly under the Éditions Caractère and Éditions Transcontinental brands.

=== TC Media - Facilities ===
| Facility Name | Location | Country |
|---|---|---|
| TC Media HQ | Montreal, QC | Canada |
| Distribution Centre - Education | Boucherville, QC | Canada |
