= Canada's Next Top Model season 1 =

Canada's Next Top Model
- Season 1
- Judges: Tricia Helfer; Jeanne Beker; Paul Venoit; Stacey McKenzie
- No. of contestants: 10
- Winner: Andrea Muizelaar
- No. of episodes: 8

Release
- Original network: Citytv
- Original release: May 31 – July 19, 2006

Season chronology
- Next → Season 2

Cycle one of Canada's Next Top Model, the Canadian adaptation of Tyra Banks' America's Next Top Model, aired on Citytv from May to July 2006. The show was hosted by Canadian model and actress Tricia Helfer, who also served the role of head judge with a judging panel composed of columnist and designer Jeanne Beker, former model Stacey McKenzie, and make-up artist Paul Venoit. The creative director of America's Next Top Model, Jay Manuel also made guest appearances in the cycle, and later went on to host the show for its next two seasons.

The prize package for this cycle included a modeling contract with Sutherland Models, an editorial spread in Fashion magazine, and a beauty contract valued at CA$100,000 from Procter & Gamble.

The winner of the competition was 19-year-old Andrea Muizelaar from Whitby, Ontario.

== Cast ==
=== Contestants ===
(Ages stated are at start of contest)

Contestant	Age	Height	Hometown	Finish	Place
Sylvie Majcher	23	5 ft 9 in (1.75 m)	Sherwood Park, Alberta	Episode 1	10
Dawn Buggins †	22	5 ft 10 in (1.78 m)	Calgary, Alberta	Episode 2	9
Natalie Talson	21	6 ft 0 in (1.83 m)	New Westminster, British Columbia	Episode 3	8
Heather Dorssers	20	5 ft 10 in (1.78 m)	Blenheim, Ontario	Episode 4	7
Tenika Davis	23	5 ft 9.25 in (1.76 m)	Newmarket, Ontario	Episode 5	6
Ylenia Aurucci	23	5 ft 10 in (1.78 m)	Vancouver, British Columbia	Episode 6	5
Brandi Alexander	21	5 ft 8 in (1.73 m)	Vancouver, British Columbia	Episode 7	4
Sisi Wang	23	5 ft 9 in (1.75 m)	Richmond, British Columbia	Episode 8	3
Alanna Shelast	19	5 ft 10 in (1.78 m)	Kelowna, British Columbia	Episode 8	2
Andrea Muizelaar	19	5 ft 9.5 in (1.77 m)	Whitby, Ontario	Episode 8	1

=== Judges ===
- Tricia Helfer (host)
- Jeanne Beker
- Paul Venoit
- Stacey McKenzie

=== Other cast members ===
- Sima Kumar

== Episodes ==
No. overall	No. in season	Title	Original release date
1	1	"Hit The Dance Floor Running"	May 31, 2006
The top ten contestants arrived in Victoria, British Columbia where they met Jay Manuel to have their polaroids taken before being instructed to assemble outfits from Miss Sixty for a catwalk lesson, in which Heather was deemed to be the best performer. After moving into their new house and meeting host Tricia Helfer for a night out, the models took on their first photo shoot, in which they had to portray iconic women of rock. After deliberation, Sylvie became the first contestant to leave the competition.: Featured photographer: Andrew MacNaughtan; Special guests: Jay Manuel, Kelly Streit, Brandon Hall
2	2	"Float Like a Butterfly, Fight Like a Babe"	June 7, 2006
The top nine contestants received makeovers, and took part in a Fight Club themed photo shoot session with photographer Christopher Wadsworth. At elimination, the contestants were asked to name the contestant they thought should be sent home. After deliberation, Dawn became the second contestant to leave the competition.: Featured photographer: Christopher Wadsworth; Special guest: Greg Wencel
3	3	"Walk This Way"	June 14, 2006
The top eight contestants met judge Stacey McKenzie for a runway lesson at a bowling alley, and had to perform in a show in front of the Victoria Vikes rugby team for a challenge, which was won by Brandi. and later had a diamond photo shoot with a Cadillac XLR in which they had to portray the role of an annoyed partner being stood up by her boyfriend. At panel, Natalie became the third contestant to leave the competition.: Special guests: Phillip Bloch, Brad Smith
4	4	"Topping It All Off"	June 21, 2006
The top seven contestants were challenged to a fitness test, which was won by Brandi, and later headed for a night out. At the photo shoot, the contestants discovered that they would have to pose in lingerie with a male model. At elimination, Heather became the fourth contestant to leave the competition: Featured photographer: Malcolm Tweedy; Special guest: Harley Pasternakk
5	5	"She Has The Weakest Photograph"	June 28, 2006
The top six contestants learned some discomforting truths about the modeling industry during a meeting with fashion journalist Michael Gross, and later took part in an editorial shoot where they had to pose with a falcon before trying to stand out in a group shot. At elimination, Tenika became the fifth contestant to leave the competition.: Featured photographer: Malcolm Tweedy; Special guests: Michael Gross
6	6	"Beauty Is As Beauty Poses"	July 5, 2006
The top five contestants received a visit from Tricia Helfer, who taught them how to master their facial expressions and channel their emotions. They later had a challenge in which they had their natural beauty shots taken in black and white, where Brandi was chosen as the winner. For the main photo shoot, the contestants had a new set of beauty shots taken for Pantene. At elimination, Ylenia became the sixth contestant to leave the competition.: Featured photographer: Rob Dali; Special guest: Rob Dali
7	7	"Get Ready, Get Set, Go See!"	July 12, 2006
The top four contestants were sent on go-sees under a time restraint, at the end of which Andrea and Sisi were chosen as the best performers. For the photo shoot, the contestants were styled in 1980s workout garb as they posed with several random items. At elimination, Brandi became the seventh contestant to leave the competition.: Featured photographer: Christopher Wadsworth; Special guest: Sarah Bancroft
8	8	"Runway Race To The Finish"	July 19, 2006
The top three contestants shot a commercial for CoverGirl, after which Sisi became the last contestant to leave the competition. The finalists had one last photo shoot for the cover of Fashion magazine, before taking part in a final runway show to help determine the winner. After the final deliberation, Andrea was crowned as the first winner of Canada's Next Top Model.: Featured photographer: Candace Meyer; Special guest: Jay Manuel

== Results ==
Order	Episodes								
Order	1	2	3	4	5	6	7	8	
1	Brandi	Alanna	Heather	Brandi	Brandi	Alanna	Alanna	Andrea	Andrea
2	Heather	Heather	Brandi	Sisi	Sisi	Sisi	Andrea	Alanna	Alanna
3	Sisi	Tenika	Sisi	Andrea	Alanna	Andrea	Sisi	Sisi	
4	Ylenia	Ylenia	Andrea	Tenika	Andrea	Brandi	Brandi		
5	Andrea	Andrea	Alanna	Ylenia	Ylenia	Ylenia			
6	Tenika	Natalie	Ylenia	Alanna	Tenika				
7	Alanna	Sisi	Tenika	Heather					
8	Dawn	Brandi	Natalie						
9	Natalie	Dawn							
10	Sylvie								

The contestant was eliminated
The contestant won the competition

=== Average call-out order ===
Final two are not included.

Rank by average	Place	Model	Call-out total	Number of call-outs	Call-out average
1–2	4	Brandi	21	7	3.00
1–2	7	Heather	12	4	3.00
3	3	Sisi	25	8	3.12
4	2	Alanna	26	8	3.25
5	1	Andrea	27	8	3.37
6	5	Ylenia	29	6	4.83
7	6	Tenika	26	5	5.20
8	8	Natalie	23	3	6.67
9	9	Dawn	17	2	8.50
10	10	Sylvie	10	1	10.00

=== Bottom two ===
Episode	Contestants	Eliminated
1	Natalie & Sylvie	Sylvie
2	Brandi & Dawn	Dawn
3	Natalie & Tenika	Natalie
4	Alanna & Heather	Heather
5	Tenika & Ylenia	Tenika
6	Brandi & Ylenia	Ylenia
7	Brandi & Sisi	Brandi
8	Alanna & Sisi	Sisi
8	Alanna & Andrea	Alanna

The contestant was eliminated after her first time in the bottom two
The contestant was eliminated after her second time in the bottom two
The contestant was eliminated after her third time in the bottom two
The contestant was eliminated in the final judging and placed as the runner-up

=== Photo shoot guide ===
- Episode 1 photo shoot: Iconic women of rock
- Episode 2 photo shoot: Fight Club
- Episode 3 photo shoot: Cars & diamonds are a girls best friend
- Episode 4 photo shoot: Lingerie and topless
- Episode 5 photo shoot: Lady of the manor with a falcon
- Episode 6 photo shoot: Pantene beauty campaign
- Episode 7 photo shoot: 80's workout
- Episode 8 commercial & photo shoot: CoverGirl, Fashion magazine covers

=== Makeovers ===
- Dawn – Layered with bangs
- Natalie – Long strawberry blonde weave with bangs
- Heather – Cut short with brown highlights
- Tenika – Long straight chocolate brown extensions and eyebrows shaped
- Ylenia – Trimmed and blown-out with highlights
- Brandi – Straightened
- Sisi – Extra shine
- Alanna – Chin length bob and dyed chestnut red
- Andrea – Long dark red extensions intended; later, pixie cut

== Post–Top Model careers ==
- Sylvie Majcher signed with Sutherland Models. She has taken a couple of test shots and appeared on Just Add Water campaign. She retired from modeling in 2009.
- Dawn Buggins signed with Sutherland Models, I Model Management and Ave Management in Singapore. She has taken a couple of test shots and appeared on Levi's campaign. She retired from modeling in 2011. In 2017, she was diagnosed with health issues and died at age 33 on March 24.
- Natalie Talson signed with an agency in Toronto, taken a couple of test shots and appeared on magazine cover and editorials for Indulge Winter 2013. She retired from modeling in 2016.
- Heather Dorssers signed with Sutherland Models. She has taken a couple of test shots and walk the runway for several designers of Toronto L'Oreal Fashion Week. She has modeled for L'Oreal campaign and appeared on magazine editorials for Driven May 2007. Dorssers retired from modeling in 2010.
- Tenika Davis signed with Ford Models, Spot 6 Management and Specs Model Management. She has taken a couple of test shots and appeared on magazine cover and editorials for Elle, Glamour, Fashion, Glow, O US, Canadian Living September 2012, Dannyco July–August 2017, French Fries May 2021, W US May 2021, Cosmopolitan México June 2021,... She has modeled for Winners, Hudson's Bay Company, Lolë S/S 2016, Kleinfeld, Wear Numi, Stephan Caras,... and walk the runway of French Connection, Roots Canada, Rudsak, Andy Thê-Anh F/W 2007, Izzy Camillieri F/W 2007, Slavka Plavic S/S 2008, Gaudet Fall 2010, Coccolily Fall 2010, Pat McDonagh F/W 2010, Nordstrom,... Beside modeling, she was one of the 26 Briefcase Model of Deal or No Deal Canada and also pursuing an acting career, which she has appeared in many movies & TV shows.
- Ylenia Aurucci signed with Sutherland Models. She has taken a couple of test shots and appeared on a campaign for TRESemmé, Rebel Rebel Fashion,... Beside modeling, she has also competed on Miss Italia nel Mondo 2007 and Miss Universe Canada 2009 which she placed 1st Runner-up. Aurucci retired from modeling in 2010.
- Brandi Alexander signed with Sutherland Models. She has taken a couple of test shots and was feature in Playboy. She has modeled for Army & Navy Stores, Black & Lee, Bodog Sportsbook, Salon Savvy, BossBabe,... Beside modeling, she was one of the 26 Briefcase Model of Deal or No Deal Canada. She is now no longer pursue modeling and currently pursuing an acting career, which she has appeared in many movies & TV shows.
- Sisi Wang signed with Sutherland Models and Elmer Olsen Model Management. She has taken a couple of test shots and walk the runway for several designers of Toronto L'Oreal Fashion Week 2007. She has appeared on magazine cover and editorials for New Star Times August 2006, HELLO! September 2006, Maclean's September 2006, Life Style China, Blink #2 September 2007,... and modeled for Waffles+Falafels, Lotto Super 7, BC Translink, Samsung, Yahoo! Travel, Bentall Centre, Converse, Kohl's,... She retired from modeling in 2010.
- Alanna Shelast signed with Sutherland Models. She has taken a couple of test shots and modeled for Pomme Salon, Kelowna Beach Rentals,.... She retired from modeling in 2017.
- Andrea Muizelaar has collected her prizes and signed with Sutherland Models. She has taken a couple of test shots and appeared on magazine cover and editorials for Fashion, Elle, HELLO!, Sposa Wedding Fall 2006,... She appeared in CoverGirl campaign ads and mostly did a publicity mall tour after the show's finale at Sears stores. She retired from modeling just 4-month after the show.

=== Aftermath ===
Four months after winning the competition, Muizelaar announced she was leaving the modeling world. Muizelaar initially stated that modeling was "not the best thing out there". It was eventually revealed that it was due to her struggles with anorexia, noting that there was pressure to remain skinny, as she was often told "how good [she] looked at [her] skinniest". Ever since leaving modeling, she started to gain back the weight she lost during her eating disorder days. Additionally, although she initially stated that she booked most of the jobs she went for, she then stated that winning the show actually brought her few opportunities, and also noted that the winnings were subject to income tax.
