= Canada's Next Top Model season 2 =

Canada's Next Top Model
- Season 2
- Judges: Jay Manuel; Paul Alexander; Jeanne Beker; Yasmin Warsame
- No. of contestants: 10
- Winner: Rebecca Hardy
- No. of episodes: 8

Release
- Original network: Citytv
- Original release: May 30 – July 18, 2007

Season chronology
- ← Previous; Season 1 Next → Season 3 (on CTV)

Cycle 2 of Canada's Next Top Model, the Canadian adaptation of Tyra Banks' America's Next Top Model, aired on Citytv from May to July 2007. The show was hosted by Jay Manuel, replacing former host Tricia Helfer, who left the series to pursue her acting career. Jeanne Beker was the only returning judge from last season, with the new judges being photographer Paul Alexander, and model Yasmin Warsame. This was the last cycle aired on Citytv before it moved to CTV. Encore presentations aired on A-Channel, Star! and FashionTelevisionChannel.

The prize package for this cycle included a modeling contract with Sutherland Models, an editorial spread in Fashion magazine, and a beauty contract valued at $100,000 from Procter & Gamble.

The winner of the competition was 21-year-old Rebecca Hardy from Mannheim, Ontario.

== Cast ==
=== Contestants ===
(Ages stated are at start of contest)

Contestant	Age	Height	Hometown	Finish	Place
Mika Emmerson	25	5 ft 8.5 in (1.74 m)	Toronto, Ontario	Episode 1	10
Jacqueline Blackman	20	5 ft 7.5 in (1.71 m)	Vancouver, British Columbia	Episode 2	9
Steff Groulx	18	5 ft 10.5 in (1.79 m)	Cornwall, Ontario	Episode 3	8
Gina Guimont	23	5 ft 10 in (1.78 m)	Calgary, Alberta	Episode 4	7
Mo Ninalowo	20	5 ft 7 in (1.70 m)	Toronto, Ontario	Episode 5	6
Cori MacKinnon	18	5 ft 8 in (1.73 m)	Valley East, Ontario	Episode 7	5
Tia Ayrton-Hill	19	5 ft 10 in (1.78 m)	Montreal, Quebec	Episode 8	4
Tara Winspur	19	6 ft 0 in (1.83 m)	Calgary, Alberta	Episode 8	3
Sinead Brady	18	5 ft 8 in (1.73 m)	Chatham-Kent, Ontario	Episode 8	2
Rebecca Hardy	21	5 ft 11 in (1.80 m)	Mannheim, Ontario	Episode 8	1

=== Judges ===
- Jay Manuel (host)
- Paul Alexander
- Jeanne Beker
- Yasmin Warsame

=== Other cast members ===
- Nolé Marin - creative director
- Stacey McKenzie - runway coach

== Episodes ==
No. overall	No. in season	Title	Original release date
9	1	"The First Cut Is The Deepest!"	May 30, 2007
The twenty contestants arrived in Toronto for casting, where the top ten contestants were selected. After moving into their new home, the top ten contestants took part in a nude photo shoot with male models. At elimination, Mika became the first contestant to leave the competition.: Featured photographer: Paul Alexander
10	2	"Tantrums, Tresses And Tears!"	June 6, 2007
The top nine contestants received makeovers, and Sinead received a $5,000 gift card for her positive attitude. They later had to pose for an eccentric beauty shoot while decorated with seafood, and after one of the contestants had fainting scare at panel, Jacqueline became the second contestant to leave the competition.: Featured photographer: Dan Lim; Special guests: Gino Garcia, Gisela Castillo, John van der Schilden, and Dan Lim
11	3	"Skating On Thin Ice..."	June 13, 2007
The top eight contestants arrived at the Hershey Centre to meet J. Alexander for a runway lesson, and had a runway lesson at MuchMusic under the watchful eyes of an audience where Tara was chosen as the winner. They later shot a commercial for Venus razors with Nolé Marin. At elimination, Steff became the third contestant to leave the competition.: Featured director: Nolé Marin; Special guest: J. Alexander, Matte Babel
12	4	"Getting Carried Away"	June 20, 2007
The top seven contestants practiced their interview skills with judge Jeanne Beker, and later met Degrassi's Adamo Ruggiero for a mock interview challenge meant to test their composure, where Sinead was chosen as the winner. They later had a Bond inspired photo shoot with a helicopter and the yet to be released 2008 Cadillac CTF while decked out in expensive jewelry and gowns. At elimination, Gina became the fourth contestant to leave the competition.: Featured photographer: Mike Rosenthal; Special guest: Dina Pugliese, Adamo Ruggiero
13	5	"Jumping Off The Deep End"	June 27, 2007
The top six contestants were taken to the Yorkville Gym to participate in a spin class with coach Stacie McKenzie, before having one-on-one conversations with Jay Manuel. Following a pole-dancing challenge won by Cori, the contestants took part in an editorial photo shoot that had them jumping from a trampoline. At elimination, Mo became the fifth contestant to be eliminated from the competition.: Featured photographer: John van der Schilden; Special guests: Chris Csak, Krista Knee
14	6	"Some Girls Have All The Luck"	July 4, 2007
The top five contestants attended go-sees with several clients in the city, after which Cori was deemed to be the best performer. They later had a dog-walking photo shoot with America's Next Top Model Judge, Nigel Barker, to promote the new Chocolate cell phone by LG while wearing lingerie. At elimination, Tara and Tia landed in the bottom two, but were both allowed to remain in the competition.: Featured photographer: Nigel Barker
15	7	"Sweet Child O' Mine"	July 11, 2007
The top five contestants met model Yanka Van der Kolk for a lesson on visual confidence before heading to French Connection for a challenge in which they had to pose as window mannequins, where Rebecca was chosen as the winner. At the photo shoot, the con were photographed for the cover of Fashion magazine. At elimination, Cori became the sixth contestant to be eliminated.: Featured photographer: Miguel Jacob; Special guests: Yanka Van der Kolk, Susie Sheffman
16	8	"Sweet Dreams (Are Made Of This)"	July 18, 2007
The top four contestants had a photo shoot for CoverGirl, which saw Tia and Tara leave the competition in a double elimination. The final two, later arrived at One King Street West for a final runway show to help determine the winner. After the judges reviewed each finalists’ body of work and final performances, Rebecca was chosen as the second winner of Canada's Next Top Model.: Special guest: Lucian Matis; Featured photographer: Jim De Yonker

== Results ==
Order	Episodes									
Order	1 (Note: In the first part of episode 1, the group of 20 semi-finalists was reduced to 10 contestants.)		2	3	4	5	6	7	8	
1	Tara	Cori	Sinead	Tara	Mo	Cori	Rebecca	Sinead	Tia	Rebecca
2	Steff	Tara	Rebecca	Cori	Rebecca	Rebecca	Sinead	Tia	Sinead	Sinead
3	Jacqueline	Rebecca	Tara	Sinead	Tara	Tia	Cori	Rebecca	Rebecca	
4	Mo	Jacqueline	Cori	Rebecca	Sinead	Sinead	Tia; Tara	Tara	Tara	
5	Cori	Tia	Tia	Mo	Tia	Tara	Tia; Tara	Cori		
6	Gina	Sinead	Mo	Tia	Cori	Mo				
7	Rebecca	Mo	Gina	Gina	Gina					
8	Tia	Gina	Steff	Steff						
9	Sinead	Steff	Jacqueline							
10	Mika	Mika								

The contestant was eliminated
The contestant was a part of a non-elimination bottom two
The contestant won the competition

=== Average call-out order ===
Casting call-out order and final episode are not included.

Rank by average	Place	Model	Call-out total	Number of call-outs	Call-out average
1	1	Rebecca	17	7	2.42
2	2	Sinead	21	7	3.00
3–4	3	Tara	22	7	3.14
3–4	5	Cori	22	7	3.14
5	4	Tia	30	7	4.28
6	6	Mo	25	5	5.00
7	9	Jacqueline	13	2	6.50
8	7	Gina	29	4	7.25
9	8	Steff	25	3	8.33
10	10	Mika	10	1	10.00

=== Bottom two ===
Episode	Contestants	Eliminated
1	Mika & Steff	Mika
2	Jacqueline & Steff	Jacqueline
3	Gina & Steff	Steff
4	Cori & Gina	Gina
5	Mo & Tara	Mo
6	Tara & Tia	None
7	Cori & Tara	Cori
8 (Note: In the first part of the episode 8 the girls were called in a random order.)	Rebecca, Sinead, Tara & Tia	Tia
8	Rebecca, Sinead and Tara	Tara
8	Rebecca & Sinead	Sinead

The contestant was eliminated after her first time in the bottom two
The contestant was eliminated after her second time in the bottom two
The contestant was eliminated after her third time in the bottom two
The contestant was eliminated in the final judging and placed fourth
The contestant was eliminated in the final judging and placed third
The contestant was eliminated in the final judging and placed as the runner-up

=== Photo shoot guide ===
- Episode 1 photo shoot: Nude with male models
- Episode 2 photo shoot: Beauty shots with sea creatures
- Episode 3 commercial: Venus razor
- Episode 4 photo shoot: Bond girl editorial
- Episode 5 photo shoot: Couture editorial on a trampolines
- Episode 6 photo shoot: LG Chocolate phones in lingerie with dog
- Episode 7 photo shoot: Fashion magazine covers
- Episode 8 photo shoot: CoverGirl TruBlend ad

== Makeovers ==
- Jacqueline – Rachel Hunter inspired volumized curls and dyed honey blonde
- Steff – Trimmed and dyed platinum blonde
- Gina – Shoulder-length bob and dyed milk chocolate brown
- Mo – Cut shorter and dyed dark chocolate brown
- Cori – Gisele Bündchen inspired blonde highlights
- Tia – Long wavy copper red extensions
- Tara – Long wavy dark brown weave
- Sinead – Natalie Portman inspired pixie cut
- Rebecca – Chin-length bob, bangs trimmed and dyed fire engine red

== Post–Top Model careers ==
- Mika Emmerson signed with Marquee Model Management and Baby Blue Model Management in Hong Kong. She has taken a couple of test shots and appeared on magazine editorials for Urbanology, Wowza #1 2011,... She has modeled for Itely Hairfashion, Aveda, Belmaica Beachwear, IMI Fashion Spring 2010, Elizabeth Grant Skincare, Dat Salon, FouFou Dog, Scotiabank,... and walk the runway of Calvin Klein, Hibebe Swimwear, Ecko Unltd., Aime by Monica Mei,... Emmerson retired from modelling in 2012.
- Jacqueline Blackman has taken a couple of test shots until retired from modelling in 2009.
- Steff Groulx signed with Specs Model Management and Sajency Models & Talent. She has taken a couple of test shots and appeared on magazine editorials for Perch #2 May 2018. She has modeled for Orchid Cosmetics, Crush Lane Jewelry, Marc-Andre Levac,.... Groulx retired from modelling in 2022.
- Gina Guimont signed with Sutherland Models, Numa Models, Elmer Olsen Model Management, Ford Models in New York City, Wilhelmina Models and Caroline Gleason Management in Miami. She has taken a couple of test shots and appeared on magazine cover and editorials for Opulence March 2007, Reflections Spring 2008, Elevate January–February 2012, Muses & Visionaries #6 August 2014,... She has walk the runway of Tori Praver, L Space,... and modeled for Stephen Trigueros S/S 2008, Oscar Carvallo, Browns Shoes, Super Sexy CPR, Tissue Cashmere, The Mansions by Devtôv,.... Guimont retired from modelling in 2018.
- Mo Ninalowo signed with Sutherland Models, Spot 6 Management, Boss Models in Cape Town and Base Models in London. She has taken a couple of test shots, modeled for Alvaro Goveia, Mario Miotti,... and walked the runway of Indiva, Roberto Cavalli, Jason Meyers,... She has appeared on magazine editorials for Vervegirl, Rouge, Sway, Swagger, Elle, Seventeen South Africa July 2009,... Ninalowo retired from modelling in 2012.
- Cori MacKinnon signed with Next Management. She has taken a couple of test shots and appeared on Cambrian College campaign. She is currently a plus-size model and has done some body positivity photoshoot.
- Tara Winspur signed with Numa Models. She has taken a couple of test shots and appeared on magazine editorials for Salysé US #112 December 2019. She has modeled for Nude Cosmetics Calgary, Freddy By Livify,... and walked the runway of Kate Hewko, Lauren Bagliore, Lennard Taylor, Pride In Business,...
- Tia Ayrton-Hill signed with Sutherland Models, Montage Models and Leni's Model Management in London. She has taken a couple of test shots and appeared on magazine editorials for W25 #36 September 2011. She has modeled for Local B Salon and walked the runway of Barilà Clothing, Coco Lilly,... She retired from modelling in 2012.
- Sinead Brady signed with Sutherland Models. She has taken a couple of test shots and appeared on magazine editorials for Weddingbells S/S 2008, Chatelaine July 2008,... She has walked the runway for Evan Biddell and modeled for Sears, Mederma,... Brady retired from modelling in 2013.
- Rebecca Hardy has collected her prizes and signed with Sutherland Models. She is also signed with Why Not Model Management in Milan and M+P Models in London. She has taken a couple of test shots and walked the runway of Calvin Klein, Aritzia, Indiva S/S 2008, Greta Constantine, Stephen Trigueros, Ula Zukowska, G-SUS Canada,... Hardy has appeared on magazine cover and editorials for Grand July–August 2007 & Holiday Issue 2018, Fashion October 2007, HELLO! October 2007, Wedluxe Winter/Spring 2008, Rouge S/S & F/W 2008, Fantastics, Runway,... Beside modeling, she appeared in the music videos "Same Mistake" by James Blunt. She retired from modelling in 2019.
