= Canada's Next Top Model season 3 =

Canada's Next Top Model
- Season 3
- Judges: Jay Manuel; Jeanne Beker; Mike Ruiz; Yasmin Warsame
- No. of contestants: 11
- Winner: Meaghan Waller
- No. of episodes: 8

Release
- Original network: CTV
- Original release: May 26 – July 14, 2009

Season chronology
- ← Previous; Season 2 (on Citytv)

Cycle 3 of Canada's Next Top Model, the Canadian adaptation of Tyra Banks' America's Next Top Model, aired on CTV from May to July 2009. Jay Manuel returned for his second season as the show's host. The panel was composed of Jeanne Beker, Yasmin Warsame, and photographer Mike Ruiz, who was the only new addition. Nolé Marin returned as creative director for the show. Encore presentations of the show aired on A-Channel, Star! and FashionTelevisionChannel.

The prize package for this cycle included a modeling contract with Elmer Olsen Model Management, an editorial spread in Fashion magazine, and a beauty contract valued at $100,000 from Procter & Gamble.

The winner of the competition was 19-year-old Meaghan Waller from Winnipeg, Manitoba.

== Cast ==
=== Contestants ===
(Ages stated are at start of contest)

Contestant	Age	Height	Hometown	Finish	Place
Alexandra McCallum	22	5 ft 10 in (1.78 m)	Penticton, British Columbia	Episode 1	11 (quit)
Tiffany McDonald	22	5 ft 8 in (1.73 m)	Toronto, Ontario	Episode 1	10
Jill Pukesh	19	5 ft 8 in (1.73 m)	Vancouver, British Columbia	Episode 2	9
Ebonie Finley	21	5 ft 9 in (1.75 m)	Repentigny, Quebec	Episode 3	8
Tara Didon	19	5 ft 11 in (1.80 m)	Châteauguay, Quebec	Episode 4	7
Rebeccah Wyse	18	5 ft 9 in (1.75 m)	Cambridge, Ontario	Episode 5	6
Heather Delaney	20	5 ft 10 in (1.78 m)	Halifax, Nova Scotia	Episode 6	5
Maryam Massoumi	18	5 ft 9.5 in (1.77 m)	North Vancouver, British Columbia	Episode 7	4
Nikita Kiceluk	19	5 ft 9 in (1.75 m)	Calgary, Alberta	Episode 8	3
Linsay Willier	22	5 ft 9 in (1.75 m)	Edmonton, Alberta	Episode 8	2
Meaghan Waller	19	5 ft 9.5 in (1.77 m)	Winnipeg, Manitoba	Episode 8	1

=== Judges ===
- Jay Manuel (host)
- Jeanne Beker
- Mike Ruiz
- Yasmin Warsame

=== Other cast members ===
- Nolé Marin - creative director

== Episodes ==
No. overall	No. in season	Title	Original release date
17	1	"Ice Baby Ice"	26 May 2009
The twenty chosen contestants arrived in Toronto, where Jay Manuel made his final selection, only to reveal that the eleven unselected contestants were the actual contestants. The contestants were then photographed by Nigel Barker for a photo shoot which involved posing with exotic animals. After being deemed as the best performer, Heather was given the opportunity to visit the Canadian ice flows for a photo shoot with two other contestants, and Alexandra decided to leave as the first contestant to quit the competition. At elimination, Tiffany became the second contestant to leave the competition.: Featured photographer: Nigel Barker
18	2	"Transformers"	2 June 2009
The top nine contestants received makeovers. They later visited H&M to meet Jay Manuel and June Ambrose for a styling challenge in which they had to interpret their new looks, where Rebeccah was chosen as the winner. The contestants were later taken to the Art Gallery of Ontario for their photo shoot, where they had to pose on a ladder with a male model. At elimination, Jill became the third contestant to leave the competition.: Featured photographers: John van der Schilden, Max Abadian; Special guest: June Ambrose
19	3	"A Warm Safe Place"	9 June 2009
The top eight contestants met Mike Ruiz and Yasmin Warsame at a pool for a lesson on model composure as they attempted to hold down a pose while being splashed with water. They later had a challenge in which they had to re-create CoverGirl's new lip stain commercial, where the Linsay received 50 extra frames for the upcoming photo shoot, which would be taking place in Nassau. Maryam was unable to travel after it was revealed that she had no passport, and the contestants had a photo shoot on the beach portraying rejected brides. At elimination, Ebonie became the fourth contestant to leave the competition.: Featured photographer: Kurt Gardner; Special guest: Helen Pak
20	4	"Model Meltdown"	16 June 2009
The top seven contestants met judge Mike Ruiz and model Irina Lazareanu for a challenge in which they had to read a fashion monologue and sell their charisma, where Heather was chosen as the winner. They later had their photographs taken for an avant-garde beauty shoot in which their mouths were covered with duct tape. At elimination, Tara became the fifth contestant to leave the competition.: Featured photographer: Chris Nicholls; Special guest: Irina Lazareanu
21	5	"Battle of the Blondes"	23 June 2009
The top six contestants met Jessi Cruickshank and Dan Levy for a lesson on handling the media spotlight, and later attended Toronto's LG Fashion Week with judge Jeanne Beker for a challenge in which they were interviewed by Trevor Boris, where Nikita was chosen as the winner. At the photo shoot, the contestants were paired up and photographed at a nightclub in a campaign for LG cell phones. At elimination, Rebeccah became the sixth contestant to leave the competition.: Featured photographer: Dan Lim; Special guests: Jessi Cruickshank, Dan Levy, Trevor Boris
22	6	"Bright Lights - No Pity"	30 June 2009
The top five contestants met Jay Manuel and cycle 2 winner Rebecca Hardy at the top of the CN Tower, where it was announced that they would be traveling to New York City for go-sees. Maryam, who had no passport, was left behind once again while the other four contestants traveled to New York. After the go-sees, Meaghan was deemed as the best performer. At the photo shoot, the contestants were photographed in a composite shot in which they portrayed a diva and her geeky alter-ego. Panel took place back in Toronto, and Heather became the seventh contestant to leave the competition.: Featured photographer: Amber Grey; Special guest: Richie Rich
23	7	"Rippin' It Up"	7 July 2009
The top four contestants received a visit from J. Alexander to practice their runway walks, and later had a challenge where they had to model couture dresses made out of tissue without ripping them, where Linsay was chosen as the winner. At the photo shoot, the contestants were photographed by judge Mike Ruiz in an ad for CoverGirl's Exact Eyelights. At elimination, Maryam became the eighth contestant to leave the competition.: Featured photographer: Mike Ruiz; Special guest: J. Alexander
24	8	"Rockin' the Runway"	14 July 2009
The top three contestants had a photo shoot for the cover of Fashion magazine, which saw Nikita became the last contestant to leave the competition, and the finalists, took part in a final runway show for designers Phillipe & David Blond to help determine the winner. They were divided by Linsay's fierce walk, strong personality and improvements despite a weak portfolio or Meaghan's strong portfolio, runway ready body and High fashion potential despite a timid personality. After deliberation, Meaghan was chosen as the third winner of Canada's Next Top Model.: Featured photographer: Gabor Jurina; Special guest: Susie Sheffman

== Results ==
Order	Episodes								
Order	1 (Note: In episode 1, Alexandra decided to quit the competition, due to health issues.)	2	3	4	5	6	7	8	
1	Maryam	Nikita	Heather	Maryam	Meaghan	Linsay	Linsay	Linsay	Meaghan
2	Heather	Heather	Meaghan	Nikita	Maryam	Meaghan	Nikita	Meaghan	Linsay
3	Tara	Ebonie	Maryam	Heather	Nikita	Maryam	Meaghan	Nikita	
4	Meaghan	Tara	Rebeccah	Meaghan	Heather	Nikita	Maryam		
5	Rebeccah	Linsay	Linsay	Rebeccah	Linsay	Heather			
6	Nikita	Meaghan	Nikita	Linsay	Rebeccah				
7	Ebonie	Maryam	Tara	Tara					
8	Linsay	Rebeccah	Ebonie						
9	Jill	Jill							
10	Tiffany								
11	Alexandra								

The contestant quit the competition
The contestant was eliminated
The contestant won the competition

=== Average call-out order ===
Final two are not included.

Rank by average	Place	Model	Call-out total	Number of call-outs	Call-out average
1	5	Heather	17	6	2.83
2–3	1	Meaghan	24	8	3.00
2–3	4	Maryam	21	7	3.00
4	3	Nikita	27	8	3.37
5	2	Linsay	32	8	4.00
6	7	Tara	21	4	5.25
7	6	Rebeccah	28	5	5.60
8	8	Ebonie	18	3	6.00
9	9	Jill	18	2	9.00
10	10	Tiffany	10	1	10.00
11	11	Alexandra	—N/a	—N/a	—N/a

=== Bottom two ===
Episode	Contestants	Eliminated
1	Jill & Tiffany	Tiffany
2	Jill & Rebeccah	Jill
3	Ebonie & Tara	Ebonie
4	Linsay & Tara	Tara
5	Linsay & Rebeccah	Rebeccah
6	Heather & Nikita	Heather
7	Maryam & Meaghan	Maryam
8	Meaghan & Nikita	Nikita
8	Linsay & Meaghan	Linsay

The contestant was eliminated after her first time in the bottom two
The contestant was eliminated after her second time in the bottom two
The contestant was eliminated after her third time in the bottom two
The contestant was eliminated in the final judging and placed as the runner-up

=== Photo shoot guide ===
- Episode 1 photo shoot: 80's glamour with wild animals
- Episode 2 photo shoot: Posing on a ladder with male models
- Episode 3 photo shoot: Castaway brides in Bahamas beach
- Episode 4 photo shoot: Avantgarde beauty shots with duct tape on lips
- Episode 5 photo shoot: LG phone ad in a club
- Episode 6 photo shoot: Couture and geeky crew member alter egos
- Episode 7 photo shoot: CoverGirl Exact Eye Lights
- Episode 8 photo shoot: Fashion magazine covers

== Makeovers ==
- Jill - Debbie Harry inspired shoulder length cut and dyed ice blonde
- Ebonie - Halle Berry inspired cut and dyed brown intended; later, short black weave
- Tara - Trimmed with side bangs
- Rebeccah - Agyness Deyn inspired pixie cut and dyed platinum blonde
- Heather - Dyed strawberry blonde with bleached eyebrows
- Maryam - Vidal Sassoon inspired shoulder-length bob
- Nikita - Bettie Page inspired shoulder length cut with short bangs and dyed black
- Linsay - Linda Evangelista inspired cut and dyed chestnut brown
- Meaghan - Long blonde extensions with bangs
