= Kerry Talmage =

Canadian comedian and actor

- Born: March 23, 1963; Winnipeg, Manitoba, Canada
- Died: June 17, 2004 (aged 41)
- Occupation: Comedian
- Height: 5 ft 2 in (1.57 m)
- Spouse: Ildiko

Kerry Talmage (March 23, 1963 – June 17, 2004) was a Canadian comedian and actor, who developed a cult following in South Africa. He suffered with diabetes and was continually battling the disease through his life.

Talmage found comedy accidentally through a defense mechanism he would use when being taunted in school due to his short height. His first time on stage was on a dare during a joke contest in his hometown of Winnipeg, to which he won beer for his routine and was subsequently taken on by an agent in the crowd, who got him his first gig.

Through most of his career, he struggled with his health, including pancreatitis and underwent a kidney transplant before later contracting cancer on one of his original kidneys. He credited comedy with keeping him alive despite his health challenges and noted in the late 1990s that he didn't think he'd have been alive by then if it weren't for his comedy career. He died in June 2004 of kidney disease.

== Early life ==
From a young age, he was taunted due to his small stature, often being shoved into school lockers and developed a defense mechanism to cope, by way of "wisecrack[ing] his way through life" and would subsequently earn a reputation as a "fearless joker". His earliest stand-up routine was in his hometown of Winnipeg. During a joke contest, he got up "on a dare" to tell a few "one-liners" and went on to win a pitcher of beer. An agent was observing in the crowd, who gave Talmage his card and called him several nights later, offering him a gig the same night. Talmage took the opportunity, getting up on stage and telling a few funny stories he was familiar with; after five minutes, he had one laugh, reflecting that it was all he needed, noting that "I felt it through my body like a high I'd never experienced before."

Kerry recalled during a stint in hospital when he was very young that he once told a joke to a child in the bed next to him. Although he was unable to recall the joke, he remembered the child laughing quietly then dying.

== Career ==
During his high school days, Talmage had originally intended upon pursuing an acting career. His first effort in standup comedy was at the Polo Park Inn in 1984, after some friends persuaded him to get up and "tell a few jokes" as a contest, which he went on to win. After a number of successful comedy appearances at the Viscount Gort, he started his own agency named Comedy Connections, which had around nine comedians on its books and book appearances for them in Winnipeg. When Yuk Yuk's opened in Winnipeg, he sold his agency and joined them, first appearing at New Talent Night and was later hired by the club to do appearances around the city. His earlier material was described by him as being "dirty", though he later made it cleaner as he felt that gave him the best chance of getting television broadcasts. Short in stature (standing 5 feet 2 inches (1.57 m) in height), he rose to become a standup headliner and for 15 years called Toronto his home-base. He traveled around the world performing and eventually ended up in South Africa, where he was writer, producer and star of situation comedy Bachelor Pad. The sitcom, which featured sketches and celebrity appearances, won a prize on its script and a pilot of 13 episodes was shot. He later went touring around Hong Kong, New Zealand and Australia.

Kerry toured with Prince, Bachman–Turner Overdrive, Nash The Slash, The Tragically Hip and Doug and the Slugs. He was also featured on The Movie Network's Comedy Special Mondo Taboo, CBC-TV's Hour Magazine, CHCH-TV's Comedy at Club 54, MuchMusic and at Comedy Festivals in Toronto, Vancouver, Seattle and Montreal.

While a writer for the Simpsons, Conan O'Brien created a character on The Simpsons based on Kerry, a kidney patient by the name of Cornelius Talmage.

Talmage reflected on the difficulties involved in making a living from being a comic, noting that comics may have to drive for hours around different clubs to perform for very little money, only after they have spent years performing for free to build a reputation strong enough that they can command a fee. He considered the possibility in the late 1980s of moving to Toronto or Alaska as he was told by numerous people that he could not make a successful career as a comedian in Canada, but he did not believe that to be true. He ultimately left his hometown in search of work further south as he felt that club owners were more focused on hiring "hot American acts" instead of home-grown "less-exotic" talent.

== Health ==
A Type 1 diabetic, Talmage was constantly battling the disease which eventually cost him his life. Born in Kitchener, Ontario, Kerry's family moved to Winnipeg in 1975 where he attended school in suburban Charleswood and went on to graduate from Oak Park High School.

In April 1993, he received a kidney transplant, although doctors did not remove his original two kidneys as the surgery was considered too risky. During a comedy performance in Montreal in 1996, he felt pains and called an ambulance, where, upon reaching hospital, his body was described as being "on the verge of a shutdown". He thought the pains may have been pancreatitis but after tests was found to be cancer on one of his original kidneys. Following his hospital stay, he returned home to Vancouver but had to cancel jobs, so fellow comics held a benefit and raised $1,500 to help him pay his rent. As a practical joke, his fridge was filled with kidney pies. He underwent major surgery in January 1997 to remove the cancerous growth.

Talmage credited comedy as his reason for being alive, acknowledging that he was bitter "about how life has handed me the crap it has" through his numerous surgical operations, yet when asked why he continued to do comedy despite his health challenges, he noted that it was what kept him alive and there was no way he would give it up. By 2001, he was taking drugs to prevent rejection of his new kidney and was injecting himself six times a day due to diabetes. He was spending around $300 on his drugs alone.

In June 2004, Talmage lost his health battle and died from kidney disease. A fundraising event in his honour took place on October 3, 2004, where comics from all over Canada took part with the proceeds going towards establishing an endowment fund in his honour.

== Personal ==
Born in Winnipeg, Canada, Kerry Talmage was known as being short in stature, measuring 5 feet 2 inches (1.57 m) in height.

By 1996, Talmage had lost a girlfriend and a fiancée to his stand up career, which he chose over his relationships. He was living with four other comics in a house in 1996, where he was referred to as Tube Boy. Having returned from a tour to find his then girlfriend sleeping with his best friend, he nearly quit comedy until falling in love again and later married Ildiko, a geophysicist.
