= Dr Norman Bethune Collegiate Institute =

Dr. Norman Bethune Collegiate Institute 白求恩中学 (Chinese) Báiqiú'ēn Zhōngxué
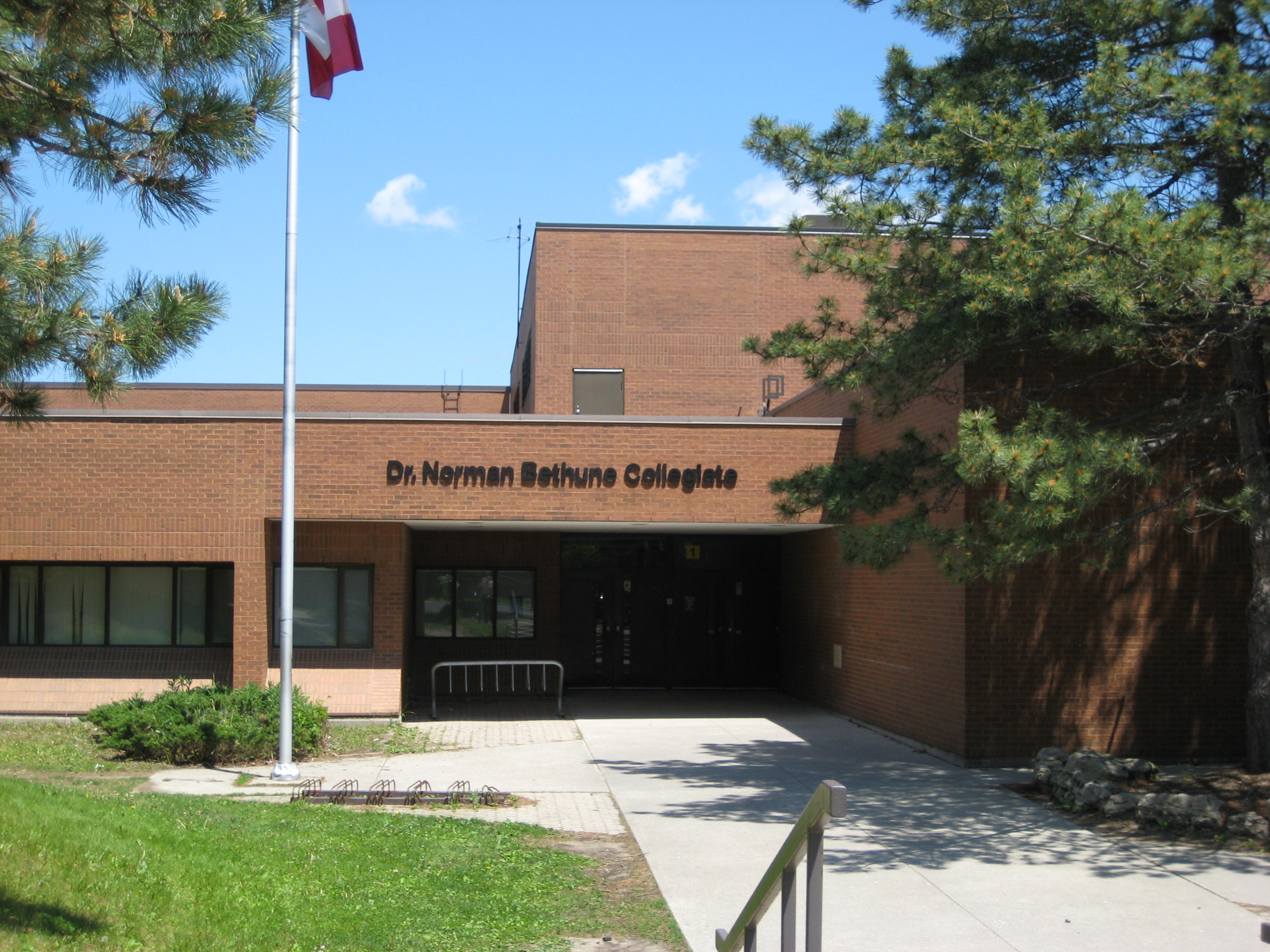

Location
- 200 Fundy Bay Blvd. Toronto, Ontario, M1W 3G1; Canada; 43°48′43″N 79°19′12″W

Information
- School type: Public High school
- Motto: Debonnaire (Confident, courteous, and charming)
- Founded: 1979
- School board: Toronto District School Board (Scarborough Board of Education)
- Superintendent: Peter Chang
- Area trustee: Manna Wong
- School number: 4116 / 937592
- Principal: Cindy Estabrooks
- Grades: 9-12
- Enrolment: 1103 (2012-13)
- Language: English, French, Putonghua
- Colours: Gold, Green, White and Red
- Mascot: Normie
- Team name: Bethune Bears
- Website: www.bethuneci.com

Dr. Norman Bethune Collegiate Institute (also known as Bethune, BCI, or Dr. Norman Bethune CI) is a high school in Toronto, Ontario, Canada. It is located in the Steeles neighbourhood of the former suburb of Scarborough. It was founded in 1979 and named after Norman Bethune, a Canadian doctor and communist who served under the Eighth Route Army. The school is attended by over 1000 students, most of whom speak a primary language other than English, the language of instruction. Bethune is also partners with the neighbouring senior's homes: Mon Sheong and Tendercare, and with Beijing#15 High School in Beijing, People's Republic of China.

== School Information ==
Students taking Modern Language classes are offered opportunities, including outings to French and Spanish movies, theatre productions and restaurants. Senior students may travel abroad to France and Spain.

- Math: General Math 9-11, Data Management, Advanced Functions, and Calculus and Vectors

Students can choose from visual art, photography, computer art, dramatic arts vocal music, and repertoire instrumental music and strings. Outside the classroom, students can join the art club, the drama club, or the music council.

The school's T-Wing features a woodshop, an autoshop, and an electronics lab. The school also has several computer labs. Students may participate by choosing technology courses or by joining the many clubs involving the technology department. These clubs include Programming Club, or Electronics Club.

- Stellar Program

The Stellar Program is an enrichment program for grade 9 and 10 in Math and Science.

This program is no longer offered at the school starting in the 2019-2020 school year.

== School Programs ==
- English as a Second Language (ESL)

Bethune's ESL program features field trips that promote Canadian culture and experiential learning. The semestered program has 5 levels in addition to ESL sensitive courses in Geography and History. Bilingual classroom helpers, full-time settlement workers, peer mentor programs, the Chinese Association, and the Newcomer Orientation Week in August help to ease the transition to Canada and to Bethune. In addition to after-school and week-end support classes, OSSLT preparation classes and peer-tutoring support ESL students throughout the year.

- Individual Education Plan (IEP)

A variety of special education programs and services are offered to meet the needs of all students, including students with exceptionalities, such as behavioural, communication, intellectual, physical and multiple learning disabilities. Students' exceptionalities are identified through a formal review process undertaken by an Identification, Placement and Review Committee (IPRC).

== Co-curricular activities ==
More information about Bethune's co-curricular activities can be found on the school's clubs and extracurriculars website.

=== Student Leadership Groups ===
- The Student Administrative Council (SAC) coordinates extra-curricular activities within the school.
- The Bethune ESL Mentor program helps newcomers with English and adaptation to Canada and provides mentorship in academic studies.
- Bethune REPs are the representatives of Bethune and help set up and run events such as parent nights.
- The Athletic Bears Council (ABC) organizes all athletic events within the school.
- Bethune Journal is the school newspaper and media conglomerate that provides a vast range of content and entertainment bi-weekly.
- The Bethune Music Council (BMC) is responsible for organizing events related to the music program at Bethune, such as retreats, banquets and various music trips.
- The Bethune Creative Arts Council (BCAC) organizes and brings awareness to events related to the visual and dramatic arts.
- The Bethune Environmental Action Team (BEAT) works to spread awareness about pro-environmental ideas and has helped Bethune become a Platinum Certified Eco-school.
- The Bethune Environmental Action Team will not apply for 2013 Platinum Eco-Schools Certification because of Bill 115 that has now been passed (Putting Students First Act).
- Healthy Schools is a committee that educates students and staff about healthy living though events promoting nutrition, mindfulness and exercise.
- Bethune Yearbook is the team responsible for designing and preparing the yearbook.

=== Clubs ===
- Anime Club
- Art club
- ASL Club
- Bethune Journal
- Bethune Outdoor Club
- Breakfast Club
- Bethune Environmental Action Team (BEAT)
- Cheer Team
- Chess Club
- Chinese Association
- Christian Fellowship
- Crossword Club
- Dance Troupe
- Debate Club
- DECA
- Design @ Bethune Team
- Drama Club
- Electronic Club
- Film Club
- GSA (Gay Straight Alliance)
- HOSA
- Library Helpers
- Math Club
- Prom Committee
- Reach
- Red Wiggler Team
- Robotics Club
- Science Club
- Skateboard Club
- Spanish Club
- Young Woman On The Move
- WE Take Action Bethune

== Athletics ==
A variety of sports are offered through different seasons. Students may choose to participate in a maximum of 2 sports per season.

=== Fall ===
- Basketball
- Cross country
- Field hockey
- Golf
- Rugby
- Tennis
- Volleyball

=== Winter ===
- Archery
- Basketball
- Cheerleading
- Floorball
- Volleyball
- Wrestling
- Curling
- Swimming

=== Spring ===
- Archery
- Badminton
- Baseball
- Rugby
- Soccer
- Tennis
- Track
- Ultimate Frisbee

== Competitions ==
- Computer and Technology Competitions:

Canadian Computing Competition, ECCO Computing Competition, Skills Canada, HOSA

- DECA Regionals, Provincials, and ICDC

ICDC 2013 - 10 Bethune students were finalists

- Mathematics Competitions:

Euclid Contest, Fermat Contest, Pascal Contest, Cayley contest, Fryer, Galois & Hypatia Contests, Canadian Open Mathematics Challenge, Purple Comet! Math Meet, Beaver Computing Challenge

- Music Competitions:

MusicFest Canada, Ontario Band Association Festival, Ontario Vocal Festival, Georgian Bay Regional Musicfest, GTA Musicfest Jazz Festival

- Science Competitions:

Sir Isaac Newton Physics, O.A.P.T. Physics Contest, Avogadro Chemistry Competition, Chem 13 Contest, National Biology Competition

- Robotics:

Since 2021, Bethune has actively competed in the FIRST Tech Challenge and has sent teams to the FIRST Championship in 2023 (Devolotics), 2024 (Devolotics), and 2025 (Robeartics)

== Awards ==
Notable Awards given to the school and the students in it

- Platinum Certified Eco-school
- Dr. Bette M. Stephenson Recognition of Achievement
- Zildjian Outstanding Percussion Section Award
- I. Keith Mann Outstanding Band Director Award

== Alumni ==
- Derrick Rossi, professor, researcher and founder of Moderna
- Jay Manuel, makeup artist, fashion photographer and creative director of the America's Next Top Model and Canada's Next Top Model TV shows
- Dwayne Morgan, spoken word artist
- Mike Ricci, retired ice hockey player
- Kevin Weekes, professional ice hockey player for the National Hockey League and CBC Sports commentator
- Nick Kypreos, retired professional ice hockey and hockey analyst.
- David Morland IV, professional golf player.
- Arnold Chan, Member of Parliament for Scarborough-Agincourt (2014-2017)

== See also ==
- Education in Ontario
- List of secondary schools in Ontario
- Mary Ward Catholic Secondary School
