= Steeles =

Steeles could refer to the following:

- Steeles, Toronto - a suburban neighbourhood in northeastern Toronto, Ontario
- Steeles Avenue - a major urban thoroughfare that forms a boundary between Toronto and York Region, Ontario

== See also ==
- Steeles Tavern, Virginia - An unincorporated community in Virginia.
