= Steeles, Toronto =

Steeles
- Neighbourhood
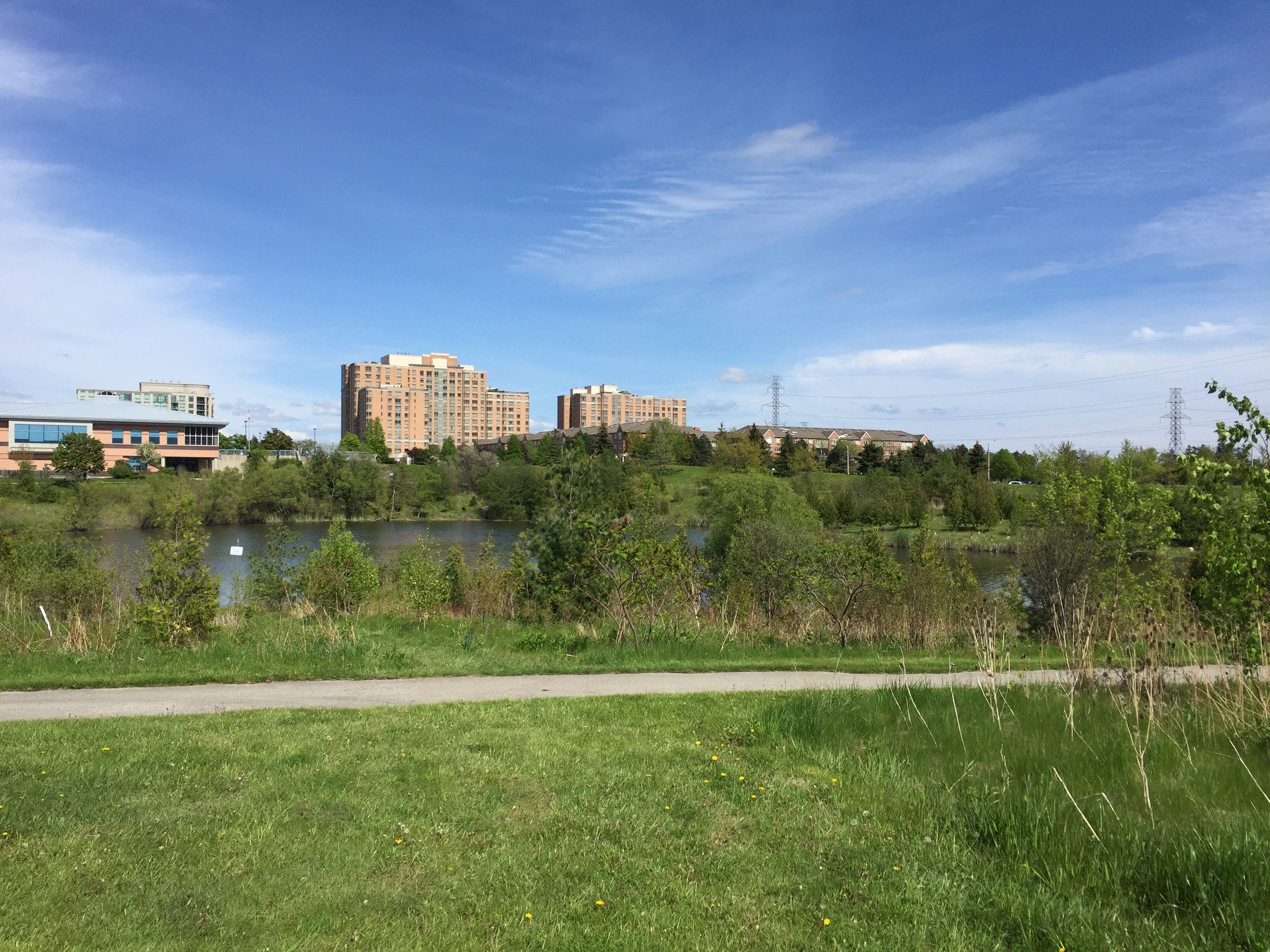
- View of southeast Steeles from L'Amoreaux Park

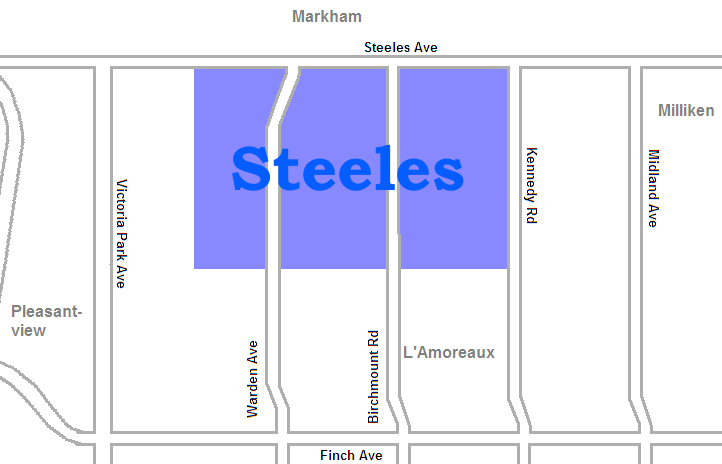
- Country: Canada
- Province: Ontario
- City: Toronto
- Established: 1850 Scarborough Township
- Changed municipality: 1998 Toronto from City of Scarborough

Population (2016)
  - Total: 24,623
  - Density: 5,436/km^{2} (14,080/sq mi)

Steeles is a suburban neighbourhood in Toronto, Ontario, Canada. Steeles is located in the north-eastern part of Toronto in the former suburb of Scarborough. To the north is bordered by Steeles Avenue East, to the east by Kennedy Road, to the south by a hydro-electric transmission line (just south of McNicoll Avenue) and to the west by Victoria Park Avenue.

The area is over the watershed of West Highland Creek, the source for which is L'Amoreaux North Park Pond, which is also within the neighbourhood.

== History ==
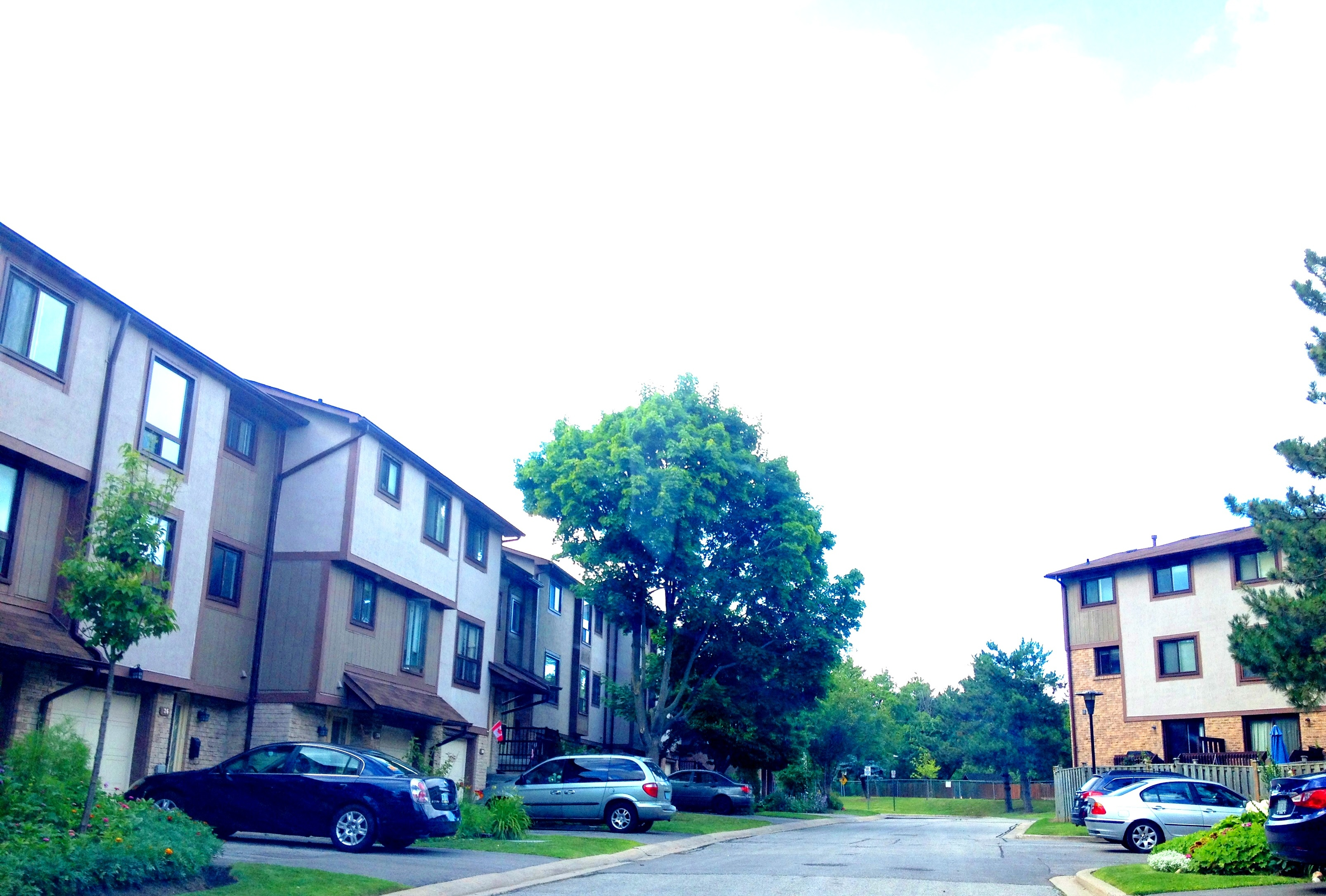
Townhomes in Steeles, Toronto

Archaeologist Ron Williamson led a team that excavated the remains of a Huron-Wendat village near L'Amoreaux North Park Pond, which is the source of West Highland Creek. Nearly 20,000 archaeological artifacts were found in the excavation area, which was called the Alexandra site. The village is estimated to have had 1,000 inhabitants in 1400 CE.

In the 17th century, the Six Nations, also known as the Iroquois, began besieging the Huron-Wendat. No longer able to resist the attacks of the Six Nations, the Huron-Wendat in the area left Southern Ontario for Quebec City in 1650. European settlers settled the area following the Toronto Purchase, who converted the area into farmland which, in turn, was developed into residential, commercial, and public buildings complemented by small lots of parkland. Before the neighbourhood was developed, much of the land was covered by hardwood forests with great stands of white and red pines. However, during the 19th century, land clearing and lumbering removed most of the original forest cover.

By the early 1980s, most residential development had been completed. Shepton Way was developed over the last farm in the neighbourhood in 2001. Development is mostly complete in the neighbourhood, save for some new homes and businesses that continue to be built.

== Demographics ==
Ethnic minorities represent 91% of the population of Steeles, compared to 51% in Toronto. 80% of the population in Steeles have a native language other than English. Of that population, 39.3% speak Cantonese and 34.5% speak Mandarin.

== Economy and politics ==
Small and medium-sized businesses bookend the east and west sides of the community; most commercial outlets are concentrated in the west between Victoria Park and Pharmacy. Within this commercial area, Bamburgh Gardens Shopping Plaza is the largest shopping centre in the neighbourhood of Steeles. It can be found in the middle of the neighbourhood at 375 Bamburgh Circle, one block south of Steeles off Warden (east side). Other small and medium-sized business centres include Passmore Shoppers, and Victoria Park Business Centre. Steeles is also part of the Chinatown of Scarborough, which extends into the neighbouring districts of Agincourt and Milliken.

The neighbourhood of Steeles is part of the federal and provincial electoral district of Scarborough—Agincourt. Municipally, the neighbourhood is part of Ward 22.

== Education ==
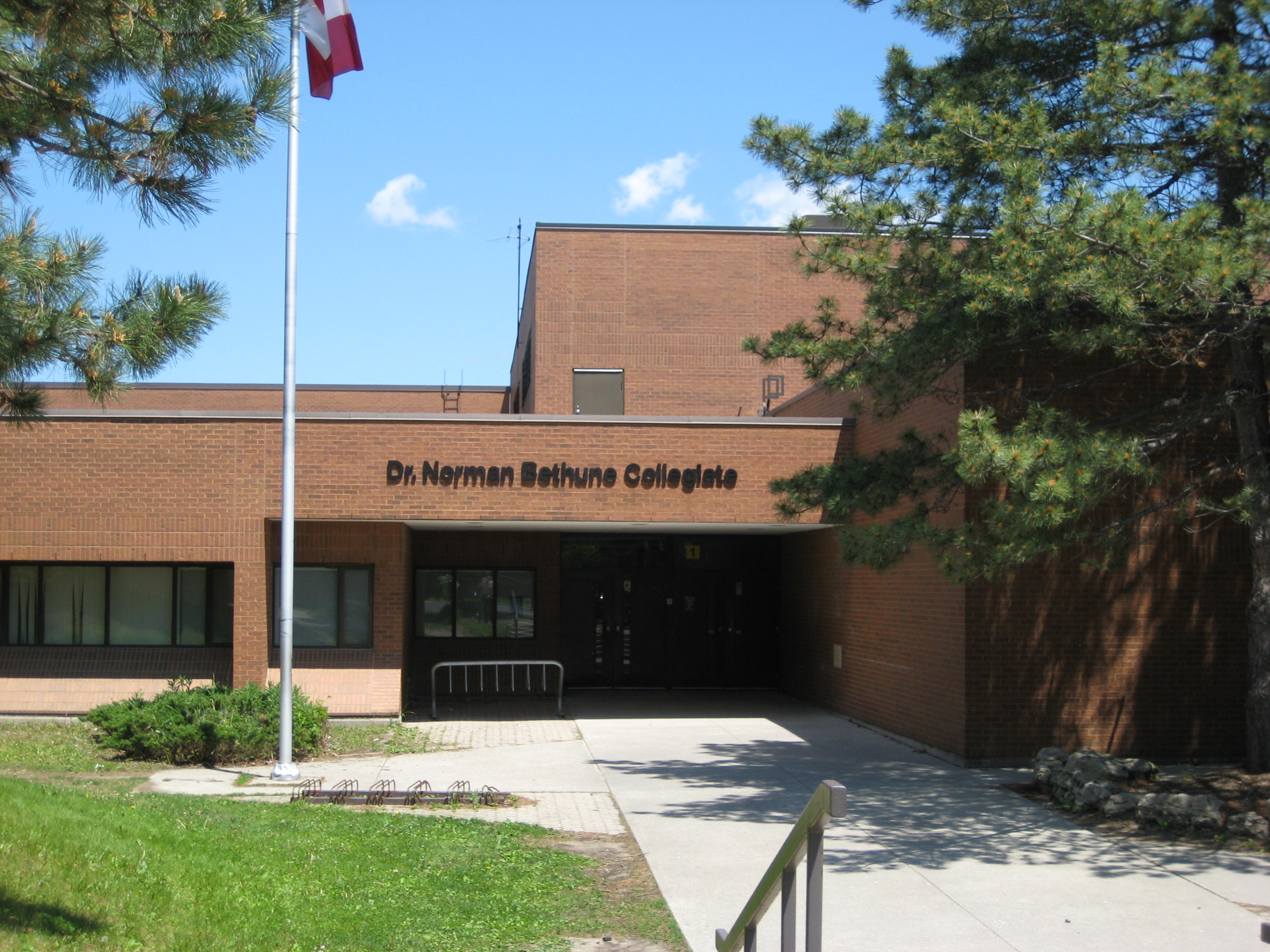
Dr. Norman Bethune Collegiate Institute is one of two public secondary school in Steeles.

Two public school boards operate schools in Steeles, the separate Toronto Catholic District School Board (TCDSB), and the secular Toronto District School Board (TDSB).

Both TCDSB and TDSB operate one secondary school in the neighbourhood. TCDSB operates Mary Ward Catholic Secondary School, whereas TDSB operates Dr. Norman Bethune Collegiate Institute. In addition to secondary schools, both school boards also operate several public schools in the neighbourhood. They include:

- Kennedy Public School (TDSB)
- Saint Maximilian Kolbe Catholic School (TCDSB)
- Sir Ernest MacMillan Senior Public School (TDSB)
- Sir Samuel B. Steele Junior Public School (TDSB)
- St. Henry Catholic School (TCDSB)
- David Lewis Public School (TDSB)
- Terry Fox Public School. (TDSB)

=== Public library system ===
The Steeles branch of the Toronto Public Library is located in the Bamburgh Gardens Shopping Plaza, in Steeles. It was opened in 1987 by the Scarborough Public Library Board, and incorporated into the Toronto Public Library system in 1998 after the amalgamation of Metropolitan Toronto.

== Recreation ==
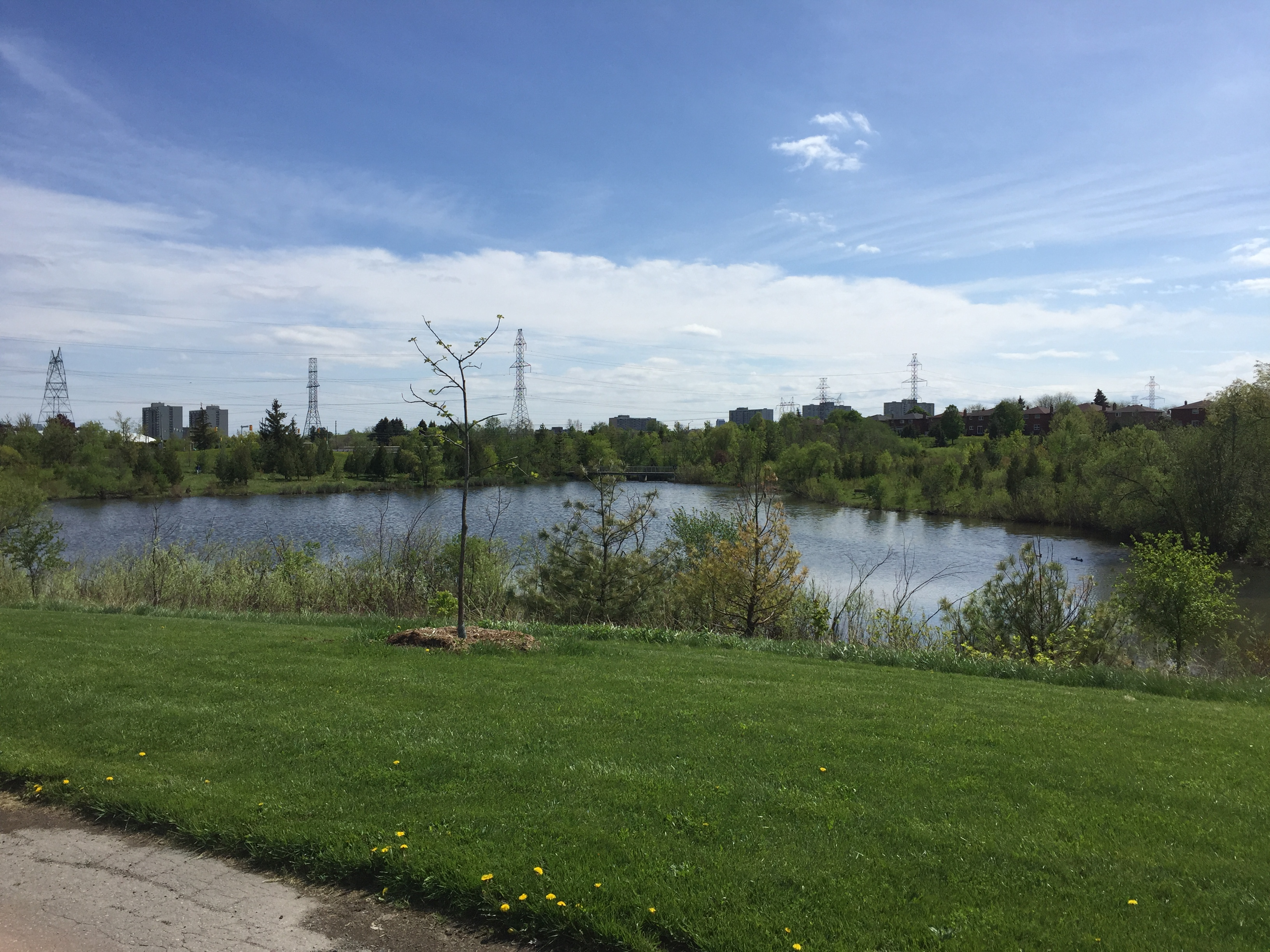
L'Amoreaux Park is one of several municipal parks in the neighbourhood of Steeles.

Steeles is home to several municipal parks that feature playgrounds, baseball diamonds, basketball courts, fitness centres, gymnasia, and playing fields for soccer, football, and cricket. Municipal parks are managed by the Toronto Parks, Forestry and Recreation Division. In addition to municipal parks, the division also manages L'Amoreaux Community Centre, located in the southeast of the neighbourhood.

Municipal parks in Steeles include:

- Bamburgh Park
- Fundy Bay Park
- Huntsmill Park
- L'Amoreaux Park
- Sanwood Park
- Shepton Way Park
- Terry Fox Park
- Warden Park

Steeles is the home of Toronto's Guyana Independence Day Festival, held annually at the L'Amoreaux Community Center.

== Transportation ==
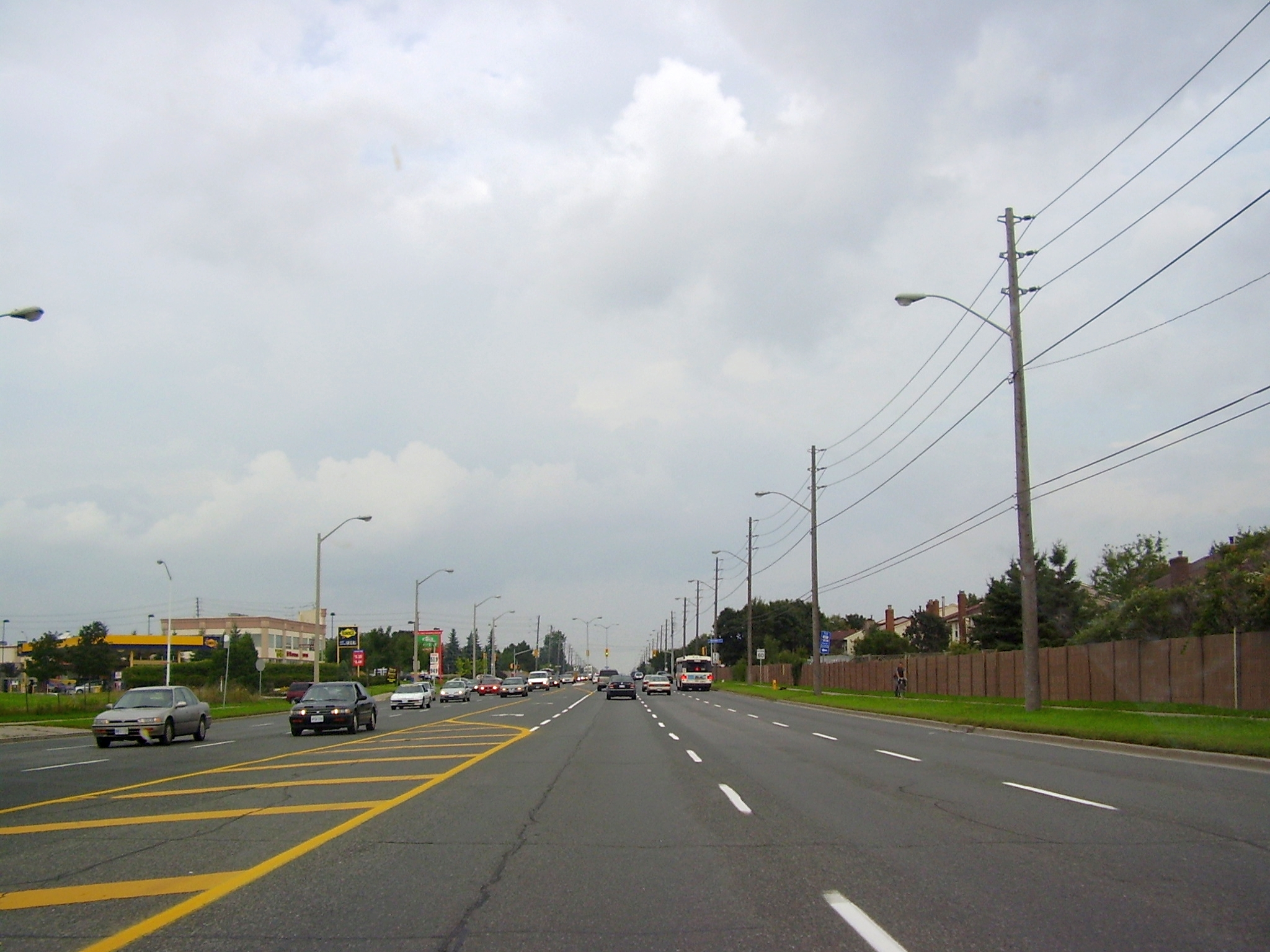
Steeles Avenue is a major roadway that acts as the northern boundary for the neighbourhood, as well as the district of Scarborough and the City of Toronto. Steeles Avenue is also the southern boundary of the York Region.

Roads are used by automobiles and serviced by public transit, particularly Toronto Transit Commission's (TTC) bus system. York Region Transit buses also pass through the area. Major roadways in Steeles include Victoria Park Avenue, a north–south road that acts as the neighbourhood's western boundary, Steeles Avenue, which acts as Steeles' northern boundary, Warden Avenue, a north–south road that passes through the middle of the neighbourhood, and Kennedy Road, a north–south road that acts as the neighbourhood's eastern boundary. The nearest highways are the Don Valley Parkway (404) to the west, the Express Toll Route (407) to the north, and the Macdonald-Cartier Freeway (401) to the south.

Although there are no designated bike lanes in the neighbourhood, cyclists often share the roads in addition to using the sidewalks along them and bicycle paths in parks. Such paths are also commonly used for walking and inline skating.

== Notable residents ==
- Wesley Williams, Canadian rapper and hip hop artist known as Maestro (formerly Maestro Fresh Wes).
- Jay Manuel, make-up artist, fashion photographer, host of Canada's Next Top Model.
- Craig Kielburger, child rights advocate and author, (co-founder of Free The Children)
- Pat Mastroianni and Cassie Steele, actors (Degrassi: The Next Generation TV series)
- Amanda Walther and Sheila Carabine, singers of the band Dala
