= Meaghan Waller =

Canadian fashion model (born 1989)

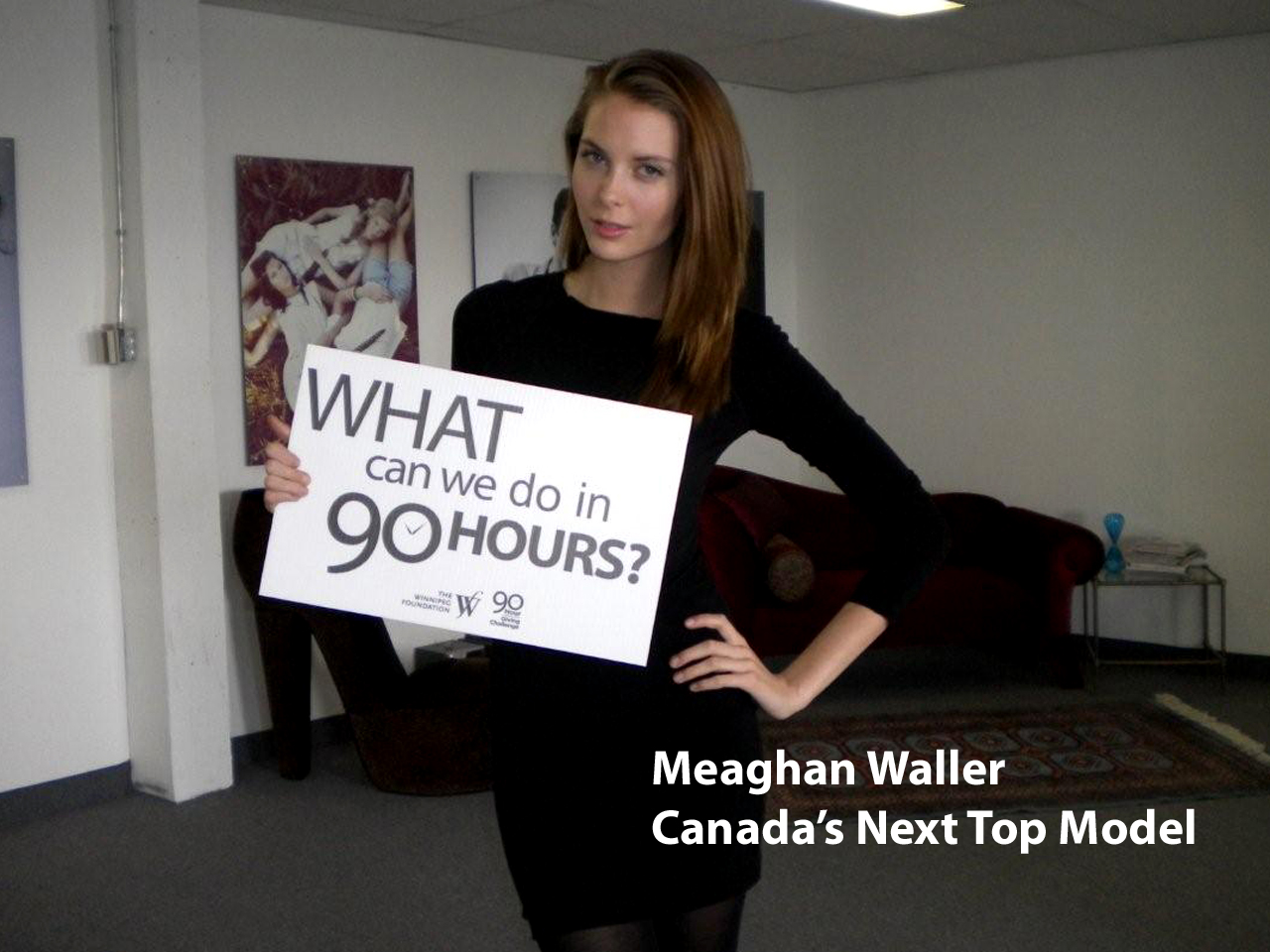
- Born: Meaghan DeWarrenne-Waller; October 16, 1989 (age 37); Thunder Bay, Ontario
- Modeling information
- Height: 5 ft 10 in (1.78 m)
- Hair color: Brown
- Eye color: Blue
- Agency: Swish Model Management; Wilhelmina Models

Meaghan DeWarrenne-Waller (born October 16, 1989) is a Canadian fashion model, best known for winning cycle 3 of Canada's Next Top Model.

== Early life ==
Waller was born on October 16, 1989, in Thunder Bay, Ontario to a Scottish mother and a Canadian father of Polish, Ukrainian, Icelandic descent. At the age of two, she moved to Winnipeg, Manitoba, where she attended Ecole Dieppe, Charleswood Junior High and Oak Park High School and was an architecture student at the University of Manitoba.

== Canada's Next Top Model ==
Waller was scouted for the third cycle of Canada's Next Top Model while working retail in Winnipeg. After attending an audition in Toronto, she was selected as one of the finalists from over 6,000 applicants. She received photo of the week once, and was in the bottom two in the last two weeks of the competition, surviving both times over Maryam Massoumi and Nikita Kiceluk. She won the competition against Linsay Willier.

== Modelling career ==
=== Print work ===
Waller appeared on the cover of Fashion magazine twice, once with fellow contestants of Canada's Next Top Model, and again as part of her prize for winning the contest. She shot an ad campaign for Capezio shoes, and appeared in magazines Clin d'œil, SANDBOX, Marie Claire, Elle, Cosmopolitan, harpers bazaar and vogue. She modeled for department stores Bloomingdale's, Saks Fifth Avenue and Barneys New York. as well as Amazon fashion, and many more. She has also modeled for Vogue.com.

=== Runway ===
Waller walked in London Fashion Week and LG Fashion Week in 2009, and in Sydney Fashion Week in 2012. She also walked for Donna Karan, J. Mendel, ODLR, Just Cavalli, Armani, Monique Lhuillier, Zimmermann, Milly, Marissa Webb, Hanley Mellon and Banana Republic. Naeem Khan.

| Preceded by Rebecca Hardy | Canada's Next Top Model winner Cycle 3 (2009) | Succeeded by None |
