= Fashion Cares =

Fashion charity fundraiser

- Status: Defunct
- Genre: Gala
- Frequency: Annually
- Venue: The Diamond Club; Metro Toronto Convention Centre; Sony Centre
- Locations: Toronto, Ontario
- Country: Canada
- Years active: 24–25
- Inaugurated: 1987
- Most recent: August 2012
- Attendance: 5,000 (2006)
- Major events: Banquet, auction, fashion show
- Leader: Phillip Ing, Michael King
- People: Jeanne Beker

Fashion Cares was an annual event held in Toronto, Ontario, Canada that seeks to raise awareness of HIV and AIDS, as well as raise funds for the AIDS Committee of Toronto (ACT). Since its inception in 1987, it, with assistance from local and national businesses, has raised over $10 million through banquets, auctions, and fashion shows. Fashion Cares ended in 2012.
