= Oak Park High School (Manitoba) =

Location
- 820 Charleswood Rd, Winnipeg, MB R3R 1K6; Winnipeg, Manitoba; Canada; 49°51′03″N 97°18′33″W

Information
- Type: Public
- Motto: Committed to Excellence in Academics, Arts, Athletes and Community Service.
- Principal: Jennifer Bracken
- Faculty: 137
- Grades: 9–12 (english & french)
- Enrollment: 1000
- Colours: Blue, White and Silver
- Team name: Raiders
- Website: www.pembinatrails.ca/oakpark/

Oak Park High School is a high school located in the Charleswood area of Winnipeg, Manitoba. It offers a dual-track English and French Immersion program. Oak Park also offers Advanced Placement (AP) courses and one of the most comprehensive fine arts programs in the province. The Oak Park Raiders have won 3 Manitoba High School Athletics Association titles over the past decade, the most in Winnipeg.

== Athletics ==
Oak Park High School has one of the best athletic programs in the province. As a regular contender in many sports, Oak Park has made their mark on the sport community. Oak Park took eight provincial titles in 2010-2011 and was provincial finalists in Varsity Girls Basketball and Girls Outdoor Soccer. The school offers an extensive list of extracurriculars, including: basketball, darts, football, hockey, soccer (indoor and outdoor), volleyball, rugby, cheerleading, ultimate frisbee, water polo, track & field, badminton, student council, musical, dance, curling and field lacrosse. The Oak Park football team is notable for establishing 4 CFL football players.

== Notable alumni ==
- Cam Barker - NHL defenceman
- Nic Demski - professional football player
- Cody Eakin - NHL forward
- Andrew Harris - CFL running back
- Sean Jamieson - professional football player for the Montreal Alouettes
- David Nedohin - three-time world champion curler
- Brady Oliveira - CFL Running Back, 2X CFL Most outstanding Canadian, Most outstanding player
- Calvin Pickard - NHL goaltender
- Tracy Spiridakos - film and television actress
- Meaghan Waller - Winner of Canada's Next Top Model, Cycle 3

== Committees ==
Oak Park is known in both the local and national community alike as having class leading committees such as their volunteerism based social justice committee, the sustainability based progressive conservation committee or their yearbook committee.

== Mascots ==
Oak Park has one mascot and his name is Rex the Raider.
