= Reality Check: Inside America's Next Top Model =

2026 American documentary television series

- Promotional poster
- Genre: Documentary
- Directed by: Mor Loushy; Daniel Sivan
- Starring: Tyra Banks
- Music by: Jasha Klebe; Benny Reiner; Empara Mi
- Country of origin: United States
- Original language: English
- No. of episodes: 3

Production
- Producers: Mor Loushy; Daniel Sivan; Ryan Miller; Jason Beekman; Vanessa Golembewski; Jon Adler; Amanda Spain; Ian Orefice; Jonna McLaughlin
- Editors: Austin Flack; Mimi Wilcox; Stefanie Maridueña
- Running time: 165 minutes

Original release
- Network: Netflix
- Release: February 16, 2026

Reality Check: Inside America's Next Top Model is an American documentary television series directed by Mor Loushy and Daniel Sivan. The three-part series was released on Netflix on February 16, 2026.

== Synopsis ==
It examines the cultural impact, controversies, and legacy of the long-running reality competition television series America's Next Top Model.

== Cast ==
- Tyra Banks, presenter, executive producer of America's Next Top Model
- Jay Manuel, creative director of America's Next Top Model
- J. "Miss J" Alexander, runway coach and judge of America's Next Top Model
- Nigel Barker, photographer and judge of America's Next Top Model
- Ken Mok, producer of America's Next Top Model
- Dawn Ostroff, former UPN president
- Nolé Marin, stylist and judge of America's Next Top Model
- Shandi Sullivan, season 2 contestant of America's Next Top Model
- Shannon Stewart, season 1 runner-up of America's Next Top Model
- Ebony Haith, season 1 contestant of America's Next Top Model
- Giselle Samson, season 1 contestant of America's Next Top Model
- Whitney Thompson, season 10 winner of America's Next Top Model
- Dani Evans, season 6 winner of America's Next Top Model
- Bre Scullark, season 5 contestant of America's Next Top Model
- Dionne Walters, season 8 contestant of America's Next Top Model
- Keenyah Hill, season 4 contestant of America's Next Top Model
- Joanie Dodds, season 6 runner-up of America's Next Top Model

== Production ==
The three-part documentary series includes extensive interviews with America's Next Top Model creator and host Tyra Banks, who agreed to participate without editorial control. The series was directed by Mor Loushy and Daniel Sivan. According to Sivan, Banks was invited to participate after production had already begun, and the documentary was not contingent on her involvement. Loushy said that Banks's interview lasted about four hours and helped provide context on the creation and legacy of the original series. The documentary revisits contentious moments such as allegations of racism, body-image issues, and behind-the-scenes conflicts and criticisms from the original show's 2003–2018 run. Also included are interviews with J. "Miss J" Alexander, Jay Manuel, Kelly Cutrone, and Nigel Barker, as well as several past contestants.

== Release ==
The series was released on Netflix on February 16, 2026.

== Episodes ==
No.	Title	Directed by	Original release date	Summary
1	On Top	Mor Loushy and Daniel Sivan	February 16, 2026	Tyra Banks and former judges reflect on the early concept and ambitions of America’s Next Top Model. As the series becomes a cultural phenomenon, behind-the-scenes tensions begin to emerge.
2	Still in the Running	Mor Loushy and Daniel Sivan	February 16, 2026	The documentary revisits controversial moments from the original series, including the Milan episode involving Shandi Sullivan, as America’s Next Top Model pursues larger-scale spectacle.
3	Rooting for You	Mor Loushy and Daniel Sivan	February 16, 2026	As the original show's ratings decline, the series examines later changes to the format and features reflections from Banks, former judges and contestants on the end of the America’s Next Top Model era.

== Reception ==
On the review aggregator website Rotten Tomatoes, 83% of 24 critics' reviews are positive. The website's consensus reads: "Exposing ANTM's outreageous stunts, behind-the-scenes chaos, and systematic issues, Reality Check delivers a fascinating and compelling look at the cost of fame in early-2000s reality TV." Metacritic, which uses a weighted average, assigned the series a score of 67 out of 100, based on six critics, indicating "generally favorable" reviews.

Upon its February 2026 release, it became the most popular series streaming on Netflix.

=== Backlash ===
The release of the documentary sparked backlash targeted at Banks. Several former judges and contestants spoke out in her defense.

Complaints surrounding Banks and fellow executive producer of America's Next Top Model, Ken Mok, center on complaints of exploitation and humiliation, which others considered common among reality TV producers.

== Lawsuit ==
In June 2026, Banks filed a lawsuit against Netflix and the producers of the documentary series for defamation, false light and related claims. According to the complaint, Banks participated in a three-and-a-half-hour interview for the series, but only approximately 16 minutes were included in the final production. The lawsuit alleges that her statements were edited and presented out of context, creating a false and defamatory portrayal of her involvement with America's Next Top Model. The complaint also claims that she was not informed that former contestant Shandi Sullivan's account of being sexually assaulted would be included in the documentary.
