= Greg Wencel =

Hair and makeup artist

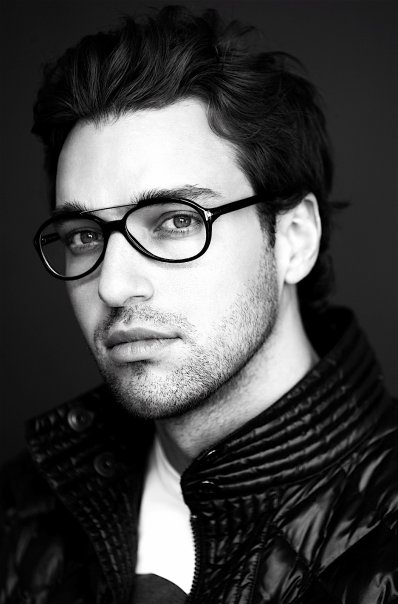

Greg Wencel is a celebrity hair and makeup artist.

== Career ==
Wencel was discovered by the Editor-in-Chief of FASHION magazine, Ceri Marsh. He has appeared as a beauty expert on Entertainment Tonight Canada, FashionTelevision, Star Daily, and eTalk Daily, and he was also the creative director for hair and makeup for the reality television show Canada's Next Top Model, Cycle 1 (CNTM). During the second episode of CNTM, he was the featured guest judge. He has worked with celebrities including Drew Barrymore and Rachel McAdams, who claimed that Wencel gave her "one of the best damn haircuts my head has ever seen!"

He is a regular contributor to FASHION magazine, FQ, Glow, LouLou, and Vanity Fair.
