= Mannheim, Ontario =

Community in Ontario, Canada

Mannheim
- Unincorporated community
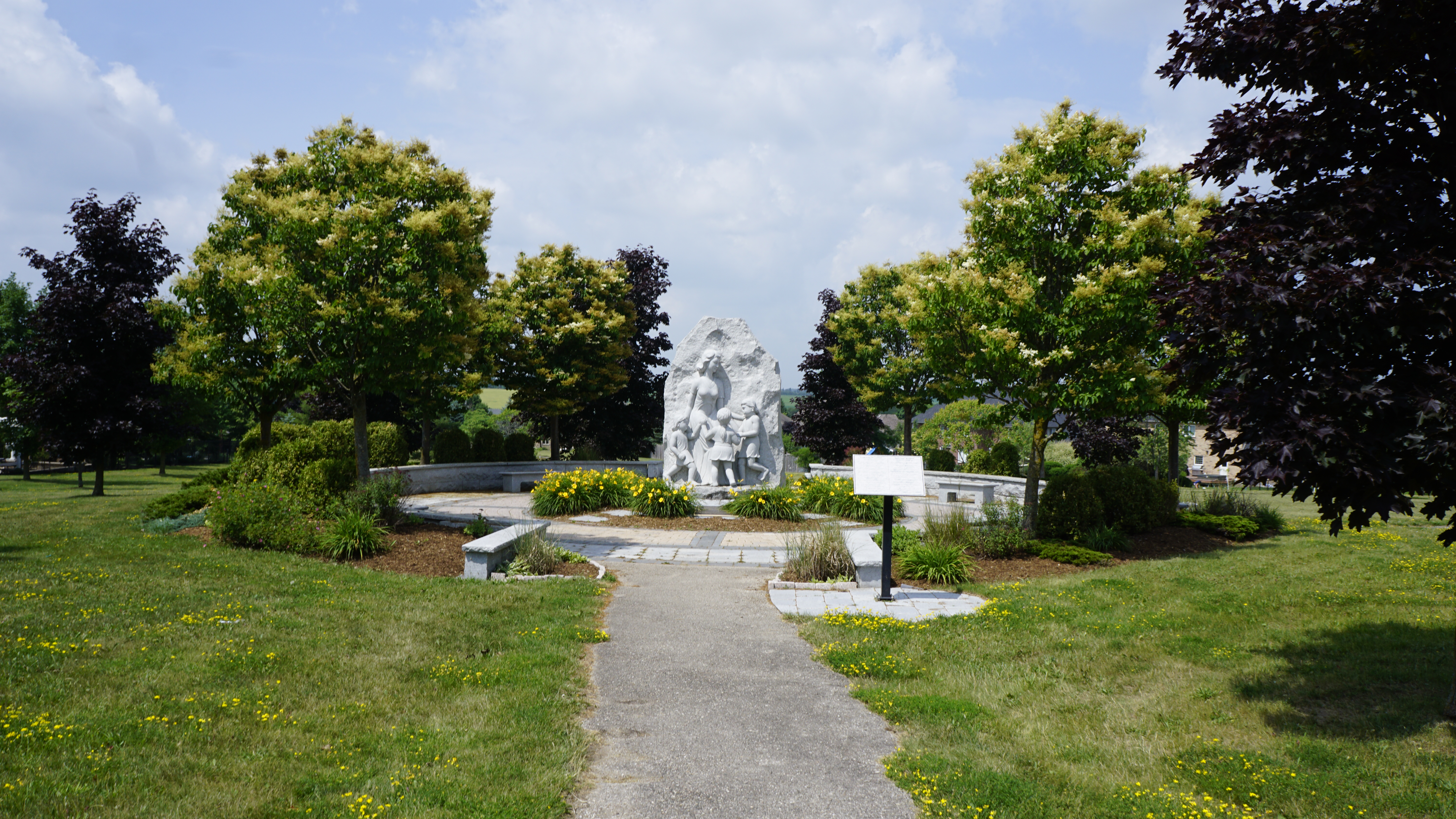
- Anna Tuerr Memorial Park

- Location within Regional Municipality of Waterloo Location within Southern Ontario
- Coordinates: 43°23′53″N 80°32′43″W
- Country: Canada
- Province: Ontario
- Regional municipality: Waterloo
- Township: Wilmot
- Time zone: UTC-5 (EST)
  - Summer (DST): UTC-4 (EDT)
- Forward sortation area: N??
- Area codes: 519 and 226
- NTS Map: 040P07
- GNBC Code: FDKNG

Mannheim is an unincorporated community in Wilmot Township in the Regional Municipality of Waterloo, Ontario, Canada. It is recognized as a designated place by Statistics Canada.

== Demographics ==
In the 2021 Census of Population conducted by Statistics Canada, Mannheim had a population of 1,002 living in 330 of its 332 total private dwellings, a change of 2% from its 2016 population of 982. With a land area of 0.99 km^{2} (0.38 sq mi), it had a population density of 1,012.1/km^{2} (2,621.4/sq mi) in 2021.

== See also ==
- List of communities in Ontario
- List of designated places in Ontario
