= FQ Magazine =

British men's magazine

FQ Magazine, launched in 2003, is the second "dad" magazine to be published in the UK aimed at new dads and single fathers. The first issue featured David Beckham.

FQ Magazine is published quarterly and targets men whose lifestyles have changed due to having children, but are still interested in fashion, cars and gadgets. Celebrity parents have created an image of dads that like to lavish themselves, and families, with consumer products like designer pushchairs and designer clothes. Famous fathers including José Mourinho, Ewan McGregor, Will Smith, Johnny Depp, Frank Lampard and Jamie Oliver are amongst some of the fathers who have appeared in the magazine.

FQ Magazine is published by 3 Dimensional Publishing Ltd. Its headquarters is in London. The current editor is Tim Barnes-Clay.

The Japanese version, FQ Japan, was launched in December 2006. It is also published quarterly.
