= Yasmin Warsame =

Somali-Canadian model

- ياسمين ابشير وارسم
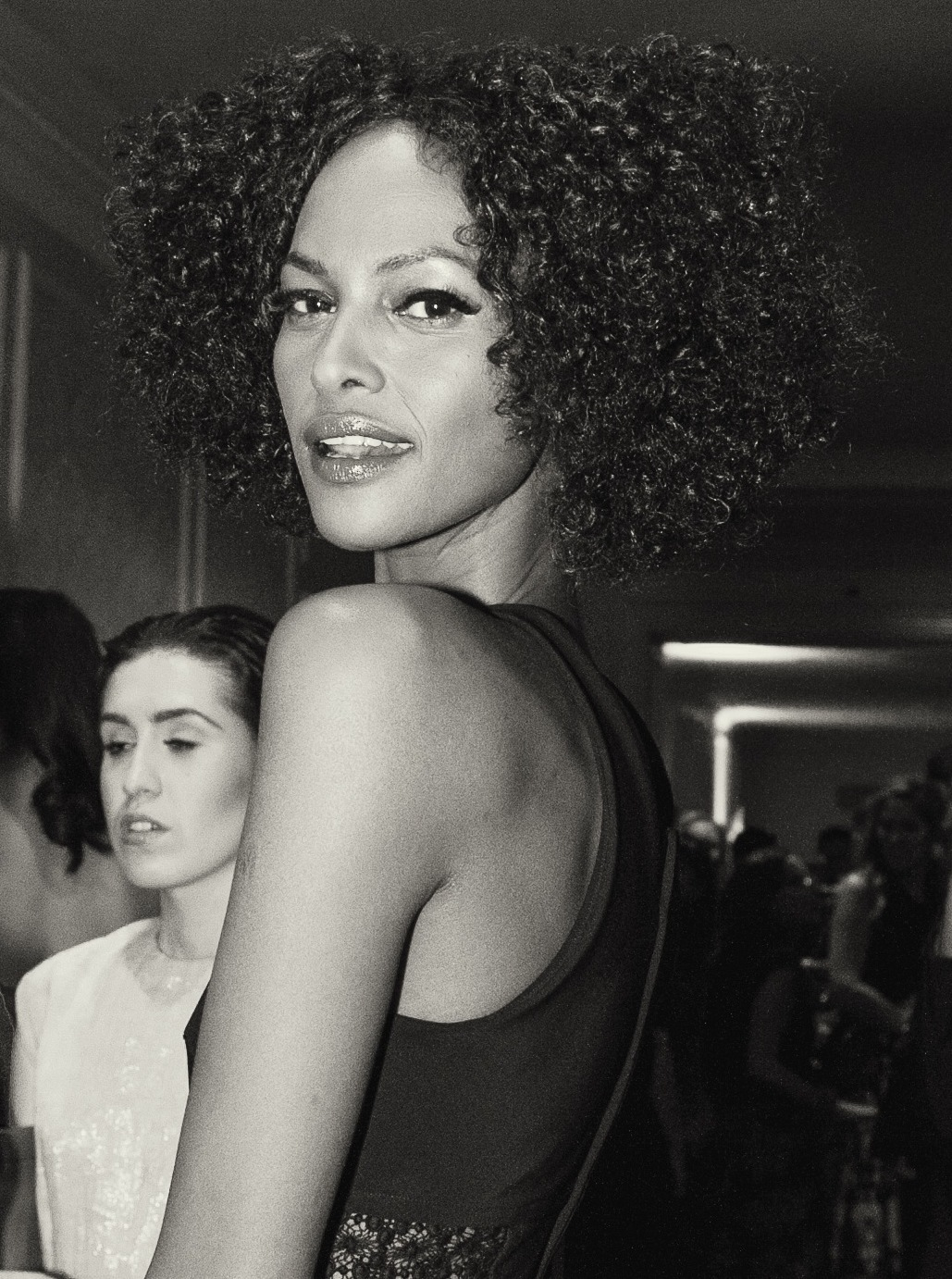
- Warsame at the Canadian Arts & Fashion Awards 2014
- Born: Yasmiin Abshir Warsame; May 5, 1976 (age 50); Mogadishu, Somalia
- Occupation: Model
- Years active: 1997–present
- Modeling information
- Height: 5 ft 10 in (1.78 m)
- Hair color: Black
- Eye color: Brown
- Agency: IMG Models (New York, Paris, Milan, London); Mega Model Agency (Hamburg); Next Model Management (Toronto)

Yasmin Abshir Warsame (Somali: Yasmiin Abshir Warsame, Arabic: ياسمين ابشير ارسام; born May 5, 1976) is a Somali-Canadian model and activist. In 2004, she was named "The Most Alluring Canadian" in a poll by Fashion magazine.

== Biography ==
Warsame was born in Mogadishu, Somalia in 1976. She is a Muslim. When she was fifteen years old, she moved from Somalia to Toronto, Ontario, Canada with her family.

In 2000, Warsame began modeling again with Ford Models in Toronto, with a booking for the Sears catalogue. In the summer of 2002, after switching to NEXT Models Canada, she was featured as the cover model of Lush Magazine, photographed by fashion photographer Koby Inc, she headed for Paris. In December 2011 she was featured as the cover model of YYZ Living then later an entire 2012 editorial from Flare.

== Career ==
Warsame has worked for agencies like SHOK Models (discovered Yasmin), NEXT Toronto/Montreal (mother agency), NEXT Paris, NEXT London, IMG New York, View Barcelona and Tony Jones Amsterdam. She has been featured on the covers of a.o. Vogue Italia and American Vogue, American and British Elle, and Amica and Surface magazines. She has also modelled both the couture and ready-to-wear runways for everyone from Christian Dior to Jean Paul Gaultier. In addition, Warsame has done high-profile advertising campaigns for Valentino couture, Dolce & Gabbana, Escada, Hermès, Shiseido, Chanel, GAP and H&M.

In 2007, she also became a judge on Cycle 2 of the Canadian reality television series Canada's Next Top Model.

She had her first acting role in Khadar Ayderus Ahmed's 2021 film The Gravedigger's Wife.

== Personal life ==
Warsame currently lives in New York City and Toronto, and is signed with IMG Models.
