= Mike Ruiz =

Canadian photographer, director, television personality, model, spokesperson and actor

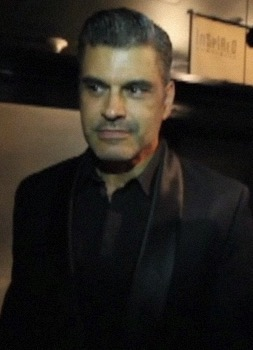
- Mike Ruiz in 2016
- Born: Montreal, Quebec, Canada
- Occupations: Photographer, television personality, director, model, actor
- Spouse: Wayne Schatz (m. 2019)
- Website: www.mikeruiz.com

Mike Ruiz is a Canadian photographer, director, television personality, former model, spokesperson, creative director and actor.

== Early life ==
Ruiz, who is of French Canadian and Spanish Filipino ancestry, was born in Montreal in 1964, but raised in Repentigny, Quebec, Canada. He was one of three sons born to Francoise and Anthony Ruiz. He moved to the United States at age 20 to pursue a career in the entertainment industry. After modeling for a decade he moved to Los Angeles to study acting. In 1997, Ruiz appeared in the independent film Latin Boys Go to Hell. In 2002 he moved from Los Angeles into old friends Peel & Tracy James' SoHo apartment in New York City to pursue his career in photography. Ruiz was then able to establish a new agent in New York City which propelled his career forward as a photographer.

== Career ==
=== Photography ===
At the age of 28, Ruiz began in the field of photography. "I found a camera under my Christmas tree and within minutes, I was obsessed. I began shooting everything in sight. I taught myself the intricate mechanics of the camera but it was several years before I realized that I could actually make a living with my work‚" Ruiz was quoted as saying. Presently based in New Jersey, Ruiz is known for celebrity and fashion photography.

Ruiz's work has appeared in numerous American and international magazines such as Vanity Fair, Flaunt, Condé Nast Traveler, Interview, Paper, Citizen K, Dazed and Confused, Arena, Italian Elle, Spanish and Brazilian Vogue and was a contributor to Dolce & Gabbana's Hollywood book and Iman's The Beauty of Color beauty book. He photographed the album cover for Kelly Clarkson's All I Ever Wanted. Ruiz is the photographer, creative director and co-owner of PhotoBook magazine.

=== Designer ===
Menswear designer J. Cheikh collaborated with Ruiz to design a capsule collection for the Spring/Summer 2012 menswear collection in hopes of capitalizing on his fashion expertise and personal style. The collection was called "Mike Ruiz for J. Cheikh".

=== Directing ===
In addition to his advertising and celebrity clients, Ruiz has branched out as a music video director for artists such as Vanessa Williams, Kelly Rowland, Jody Watley, Traci Lords, Kristine W and Shontelle. He also made his feature film directorial debut in 2007 with Starrbooty starring RuPaul.

=== Television ===
Ruiz has appeared on several reality shows, including Kathy Griffin: My Life on the D-List, America's Next Top Model, and RuPaul's Drag Race, as a celebrity photographer and guest judge. He also rounded out the panel of expert judges on the third season of Canada's Next Top Model.

Ruiz was a member of the cast of Logo network's reality series The A-List: New York.

== Personal life ==
Ruiz moved to New Jersey in 2013 with his partner Martin Berusch, who died in 2016. Ruiz has been married to Wayne Schatz since May 2019.
