= Driven (Canadian magazine) =

Canadian men's lifestyle magazine

Driven was a Canadian men's lifestyle magazine, started in 2004 by publisher Michel Crépault based on a concept presented and developed by former editor-in-chief Michael La Fave and creative director Laurance Yap. Driven was published six times a year. It offered a combination of automotive, fashion, technology, travel and leisure content for affluent Canadian men featuring exotic locations and automobiles. The headquarters of the magazine was in Toronto, Ontario. In 2007 the magazine became the best-selling men's magazine in Canada with a circulation of 150,000 copies.

Driven's parent company, Auto Journal Inc., was under bankruptcy protection and announced publicly that Driven would cease being published and would not return to the market. In 2009 the magazine ceased publication.
