= Linsay Willier =

Canadian model

- Born: 1987 (age 38–39); High Prairie, Alberta
- Education: Grant MacEwan University
- Modeling information
- Height: 5 ft 9 in (175 cm)
- Hair color: Brown
- Eye color: Brown

Linsay Willier is a Canadian model and motivational speaker. She was the runner-up on Canada's Next Top Model, Cycle 3.

== Biography ==
=== Early life ===
Willier was born in High Prairie, Alberta. A member of the Sucker Creek First Nation, she was raised on her reserve. Her father encouraged her and her siblings to play sports. She later stated the skills she learned playing hockey helped her in her modeling career.

She moved to Edmonton, Alberta to pursue her education. During her final year of school at Grant MacEwan University, she was chosen as a finalist for Canada's Next Top Model. Not wanting to drop out of school, she completed the final semester of her Child and Youth Care program in two weeks. Willier won the first runner up prize on Canada's Next Top Model and made it home in time to attend her graduation.

=== Career ===
==== Modeling ====
Linsay was discovered at West Edmonton Mall by a Western Canada Fashion Week Designer. Before Canada's Next Top Model, Willier had walked in Western Canada Fashion Week, modeled with Shemar Moore, and was regularly featured in the Edmonton Journal.

Willier auditioned for the third cycle of Canada's Next Top Model, she was selected as one of 11 finalists from over 6,000 applicants. Willier came in second against Meaghan Waller.

After Canada's Next Top Model, Linsay walked in Western Canada Fashion Week and Toronto Fashion Week. She competed in Miss Universe Canada in 2011 where she won the People's Choice Award. In 2012, she was featured as a special guest at National Aboriginal Fashion Week in Regina.

She has also appeared in several fashion campaigns such as Sho Sho Esquiro's 2012 Collection and Bethany Yellowtail "Millenia" Collective which was featured in Vogue Magazine.

==== Youth workshops ====
In 2009 she co-founded Dreams in Motion with James Jones, an organization that runs interactive self-esteem and confidence building workshops for Canadian youth. Dreams in Motion was featured in New Tribe Magazine, Feb. 2010.
