= J. Alexander (model) =

American model, runway coach, and television personality (born 1958)

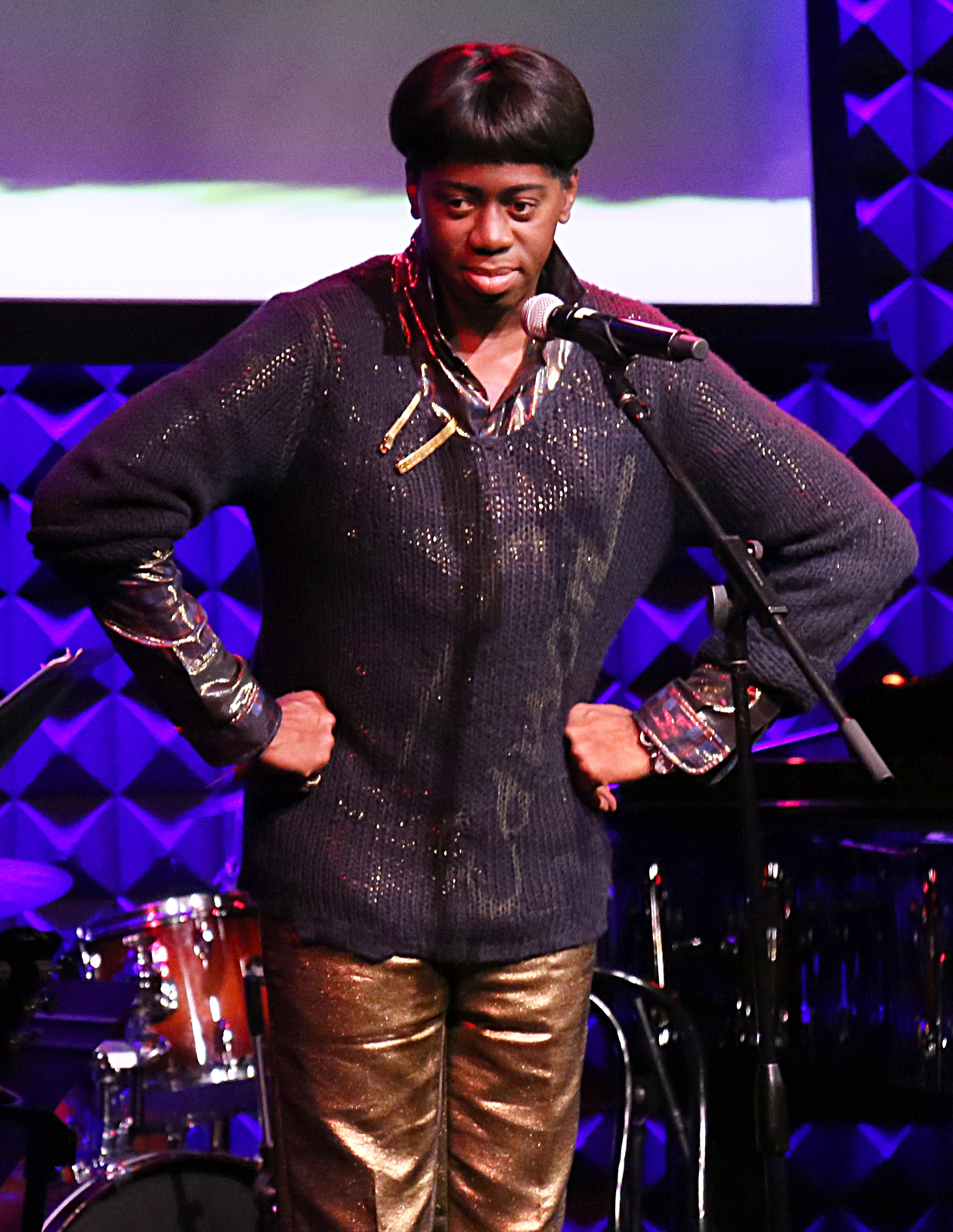
- Alexander hosting the It Gets Better Project Holiday Show 2014
- Born: Alexander Jenkins; April 12, 1958 (age 68); South Bronx, New York City, U.S.
- Other names: J. Alexander; Miss J
- Occupations: Model; runway coach; consultant
- Years active: 1979–present
- Known for: Television personality and runway coaching
- Height: 6 ft 3 in (1.91 m)
- Children: 1

Alexander Jenkins (born April 12, 1958), known as J. Alexander or Miss J, is an American model, reality television personality, and runway coach best known for his work on America's Next Top Model.

In 2026, he appeared in the Netflix documentary, Reality Check: Inside America's Next Top Model.

== Early life ==
Alexander was born in the South Bronx, New York City, the sixth of nine children of Julius and Mary Jenkins. He cites his mother as the first person to introduce him to fashion. His first job was as a paper boy, delivering the New York Times, to earn money for clothing.

As a teenager, he turned to modeling after meeting Monique Pillard, the president of Elite Model Management. Pillard was so impressed with his look that she signed him to her agency and sent him to Tokyo, where he modeled for three years. Alexander later settled in Paris and would go on to work for designer Jean Paul Gaultier in New York City.

== Career ==
=== Runway coach ===
Alexander's coaching career began with helping models backstage; he eventually became recognized for his skills. He has been coaching and casting since 1991. He rose to prominence in this field when he coached supermodel Naomi Campbell and model Kimora Lee Simmons. He has also worked with models Nadja Auermann, Meghan Douglas, Susan Holmes, Claudia Mason, Karen Mulder, Tatjana Patitz, and Julia Stegner. Alexander met Tyra Banks backstage at a runway show when she was 16, and he began to give Banks walking lessons. Banks coined the title "Queen of the Catwalk" for Alexander.

Since 1991, he has helped cast and coach models for designers such as Hervé Léger, Lars Nilsson, Bill Blass, Valentino, John Galliano, Chanel, Alexander McQueen, and Nina Ricci.

In 1993, he gave an interview on the premiere episode of the British television show Eurotrash, discussing his career as a teacher of runway models in Milan and his life.

=== America's Next Top Model ===
In 2003, Banks created the reality competition series America's Next Top Model (ANTM) as a way to give general audiences a look into what makes a supermodel. Banks, who was a close friend of Alexander, invited him to participate. He served solely as a runway coach for the first four seasons before also being added as judge on Cycle 5. During Cycle 14 of the show, Alexander was replaced as a permanent judge on the panel by Vogue editor at large André Leon Talley. Alexander stayed on as the show's runway coach until 2012 when he and co-stars Nigel Barker and Jay Manuel were let go as part of a major show renovation.

Alexander's nickname "Miss J" came from Cycle 1 contestant Robin Manning, who often confused Alexander and Manuel. On several occasions she referred to Alexander as "Miss J" by accident because of his flamboyant clothing and personality. Accordingly, Jay Manuel is referred to as "Mr. Jay", and ANTM contestants often call them "The Jays", "The Two Jays" or "Mr. and Miss. Jay" when they appear together.

He has also appeared on international versions of Top Model, such as Canada's Next Top Model, Holland's Next Top Model, Korea's Next Top Model, Estonia's Next Top Model, Scandinavia's Next Top Model and Vietnam's Next Top Model. Alexander appeared on the 4 May 2008 episode of Finland's version of ANTM Suomen huippumalli haussa. In 2009 and the 2011 finale, Alexander appeared on Britain's Next Top Model.

In May 2020, Alexander and Manuel began a weekly Instagram Live series, later syndicated to Facebook and YouTube, based on their experiences working on the show.

In 2026, he appeared in the Netflix documentary series Reality Check: Inside America's Next Top Model. The documentary focused on the series' numerous controversies surrounding the ethics of the competitions. During the interview, Alexander revealed that he had suffered a stroke in 2022, leaving him unable to walk.

=== Other work ===
Alexander is interested in design and has handmade all his clothes on America's Next Top Model except for the nurse's outfit: "I did make the hat and the bag." "All the dresses that you see me wear at the challenges, I actually sit down with a needle and thread, not even with a sewing machine, and make them all by hand. I made the ruffles and everything." He also taught design at the Savannah College of Art and Design in Georgia for 15 years during his off-time from ANTM and after.

In 2010, Alexander wrote Follow the Model: Miss J's Guide to Unleashing Presence, Poise, and Power, which "shares his story and offers tips on how to be more confident".

Alexander was featured in the track "Jay Walk (feat. Miss Jay Alexander)" on Leikeli47's album Shape Up (2022).

== Personal life ==
Alexander is gay. Alexander has stated on The Tyra Banks Show that he has a son named Boris with his ex-partner. Both Alexander and his ex-boyfriend donated sperm to a French lesbian who wanted a child, and Alexander's ex is the biological father. Alexander has said that he has a "very active role" in Boris' life. He has even joked that his "fashion genes" must have rubbed off on Boris.

Alexander had a stroke on December 27, 2022 and was in a coma for five weeks. This left him paralyzed and unable to talk. Alexander was hospitalized for a year and half during recovery, relearning how to speak. He is still relearning to walk, but can speak.

== Publications ==
- Follow the Model: Miss J's Guide to Unleashing Presence, Poise, and Power (Simon & Schuster, 2010), ISBN 978-1-4391-5051-1.

== Filmography ==
=== Reality television ===
Year	Title	Role	Notes
2003 - 2015	America's Next Top Model	Judge / Runway Coach	226 episodes
2005 - 2009	The Tyra Banks Show	Guest	5 episodes
2007 - 2009	Canada's Next Top Model	Judge	3 episodes
2009 - 2011	Britain's Next Top Model	Catwalk Coach	2 episodes
2011	Ushi & The Family	Guest	Episode #1.4
2011	Niecy Nash's Wedding Bash	Guest	
2012	The Real Housewives of Atlanta	Guest	Episode: "Nothing Ventured, Nothing Gained"
2012	The Tents		Documentary
2012	Estonia's Next Top Model	Judge	Episode #1.2
2012	Russia's Next Top Model	Judge	Episode #4.1
2014	Make It in America: Empowering Global Fashion		
2015 - 2016	I Supermodel		
2019	The Bachelorette	Judge	Episode #15.2
2020	Major Minors		Episode: "Miss J Alexander"
2020	Humpday with Hampshire		Episode #1.7
2021	For Real: The Story of Reality TV		2 episodes
2026	Reality Check: Inside America's Next Top Model		Mini-series

=== As actor ===
Year	Title	Role	Notes
2005	Cuts	Ricardo	Episode: "Wife Swap"
2017	Bull	Fictionalized Self	Episode: "Dressed to Kill"
2020	Katy Keene	Fictionalized Self	Episode: "Chapter Eleven: Who Can I Turn To?"

=== Music videos ===
Year	Title	Artist	Notes
2021	Love One Another	Tito Jackson	

== Awards and nominations ==
Year	Award	Category	Result
2009	Teen Choice Awards	Choice Fab-u-lous	Won

== See also ==
- LGBT culture in New York City
- List of LGBT people from New York City
- NYC Pride March
