= Canada's Next Top Model =

Canadian reality show

- Canada's Next Top Model logo
- Created by: Tyra Banks
- Judges: Jay Manuel (2-3); Jeanne Beker; Mike Ruiz (3); Yasmin Warsame (2-3); Paul Alexander (2); Tricia Helfer (1); Stacey McKenzie (1); Paul Venoit (1)
- Theme music composer: Eggplant
- Country of origin: Canada
- No. of seasons: 3
- No. of episodes: 24

Production
- Executive producers: Sheila Hockin; Ivan Schneeberg; David Fortier; Jay Manuel (2-3); Tricia Helfer (1)
- Running time: 60 minutes
- Production company: Temple Street Productions

Original release
- Network: Citytv (2006–2007); CTV (2009)
- Release: May 31, 2006 – July 14, 2009

Canada's Next Top Model (sometimes abbreviated as CNTM) is a Canadian reality television series in which female contestants compete for the title "Canada's Next Top Model" and a chance to start their career in the modeling industry. The winner receives a modeling contract from Elmer Olsen Modeling Agency, a $100,000 beauty contract from Procter & Gamble, and an editorial spread in Fashion magazine.

CNTM is based on the successful American franchise America's Next Top Model. It is produced by Temple Street Productions in association with CTVglobemedia and CBS Paramount International TV. Three cycles have been produced and aired.

== Show format ==
Each season of Canada's Next Top Model has eight episodes and starts with approximately ten contestants. Each episode, one contestant is eliminated, though in rare cases a double elimination or no elimination was given by consensus of the judging panel. Makeovers are administered to contestants early in the season (usually after the first elimination in the finals).

The show featured several notable differences from its American counterpart. Each cycle of CNTM lasted just 8 episodes, rather than 10-13 episodes as is typical of the American series. This is partly because each season featured fewer contestants than in most cycles of ANTM, but also because each season featured no casting or recap episodes. Furthermore, no international travel was conducted for the first two cycles (presumably due to being produced on a lower budget in comparison to ANTM). cycle 3 featured two international destinations, but the show only stayed abroad for a few days, returning to Canada afterward for all eliminations. In the American series, the final 4-5 episodes are typically filmed entirely abroad.

=== Judges ===
The judging panel consisted of fashion journalist Jeanne Beker, model Yasmin Warsame and new judge fashion photographer Mike Ruiz. Previous judges included Tricia Helfer (cycle 1; left the show to focus fully on her acting career), model and runway coach Stacey McKenzie, celebrity hair and make up stylist Paul Venoit and fashion photographer Paul Alexander. Usually, an additional guest judge sat in on the panel every week.

| Judges | Seasons | | |
| Judges | 1 (2006) | 2 (2007) | 3 (2009) |
Hosts
| Tricia Helfer | Head Judge | | |
| Jay Manuel | Guest | Head Judge | Head Judge |
Judging Panelists
| Jeanne Beker | Main | Main | Main |
| Stacey McKenzie | Main | Recurring | |
| Paul Venoit | Main | | |
| Paul Alexander | | Main | |
| Yasmin Warsame | | Main | Main |
| Mike Ruiz | | | Main |

=== Delay ===
There was a two-year gap between the airing of the second cycle and the filming of the third cycle. This was because CHUM Limited, owners of Citytv as well as then-sister-station A-Channel, was sold to CTVglobemedia, parent company of CTV. Due to regulatory concerns, Citytv was sold to Rogers Media, thus delaying the third cycle until all business aspects were sorted out. CTVglobemedia kept the rights to the Top Model series in Canada. Production on the third cycle ended in March and the program first aired on May 26, 2009, on CTV and on May 31, 2009, on the newly renamed A. The series featured 11 girls from all across the country.

== Cycles ==
| Cycle | Premiere date | Winner | Runner-up | Other contestants in order of elimination | Number of contestants | International Destinations |
|---|---|---|---|---|---|---|
| 1 | May 31, 2006 | Andrea Muizelaar | Alanna Shelast | Sylvie Majcher, Dawn Buggins, Natalie Talson, Heather Dorssers, Tenika Davis, Ylenia Aurucci, Brandi Alexander, Sisi Wang | 10 | None |
| 2 | May 30, 2007 | Rebecca Hardy | Sinead Brady | Mika Emmerson, Jacqueline Blackman, Steff Groulx, Gina Guimont, Mo Ninalowo, Cori MacKinnon, Tia Ayrton-Hill & Tara Winspur | 10 | None |
| 3 | May 26, 2009 | Meaghan Waller | Linsay Willier | Alexandra McCallum (quit), Tiffany McDonald, Jill Pukesh, Ebonie Finley, Tara Didon, Rebeccah Wyse, Heather Delaney, Maryam Massoumi, Nikita Kiceluk | 11 | Nassau; New York City |

== Production ==
The Canadian adaptation was announced in November 2005, when CHUM Television commissioned a Canadian adaptation of the UPN/The CW American reality TV series America's Next Top Model for its Canadian television network Citytv. The Canadian adaptation of the American franchise would be produced by Temple Street Productions (now Boat Rocker Studios) and Canadian indie studio Maple Street Productions in association with Top Model's owner CBS Paramount International Television.
