= Jay Manuel =

South African television personality (born 1972)

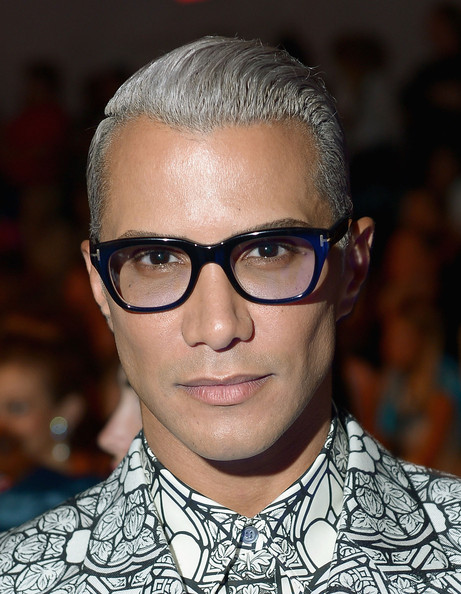
- Jay Manuel at Custo Barcelona - Mercedes-Benz Fashion Week Spring 2014
- Born: August 14, 1972 (age 54); Springfield, Illinois, U.S.
- Citizenship: Canada; United States
- Occupation: Television personality
- Website: www.jaymanuel.com

Jay Manuel (born August 14, 1972) is a Canadian TV host, creative director, make-up artist, and author. He is most recognizable as the creative director on the popular reality television show America's Next Top Model for the first eighteen seasons. Manuel also was featured as the host of Canada's Next Top Model.

Manuel is the founder of the beauty line Jay Manuel Beauty. In 2017, the brand opened its first retail location at Roosevelt Field Mall. Later that year, he was one of the judges for Miss Universe 2017. In 2020, he released his first book, The Wig, The Bitch & The Meltdown.

== Early life ==
Manuel was born in Springfield, Illinois, to a mother of Italian and Czech descent and a South African father of mixed Cape Malay descent. He was raised by adoptive parents in Toronto where he attended Dr Norman Bethune Collegiate Institute and York University. Before entering the fashion industry, Manuel was a pre-med student and also studied opera.

== Career ==
Manuel has described himself as being in "the business of managing to aesthetic".

Manuel joined America's Next Top Model in its first cycle in 2003 as the Creative Director. For nine years, Manuel featured on every cycle of the show, becoming one of the biggest shows in the United States during this period. After 18 seasons with the show, Nigel Barker and J. Alexander did not return for the 19th cycle as their contracts were not renewed. Following the announcement, Manuel decided to leave the show. The show was cancelled three years later, being renewed on December 12, 2016, on VH1.

Manuel was the host and lead judge of the second and third cycles of Canada's Next Top Model, a spin-off to ANTM. He also made a cameo appearance in Degrassi Takes Manhattan, as well as playing himself in an episode of the comedy-drama television series Being Erica.

In 2014, Manuel launched Jay Manuel Beauty, a line of cosmetics based on a new Filter Finish Collection technology. Manuel was announced as a judge for the Miss Universe 2017 beauty pageant in early 2017. He was one of the six final judges who crowned Demi-Leigh Nel-Peters as Miss Universe 2017 at the event in Las Vegas, Nevada.

In May 2020, Manuel and his America's Next Top Model colleague, Miss J. Alexander, began a weekly Instagram Live series, later syndicated to Facebook and YouTube, based on their experiences working on the show.

== Personal life ==
Jay is openly gay. Although he is somewhat private about his romantic life, he regularly advocates for LGBTQ rights. In 2011, he created an "It Gets Better" video to empower LGBTQ youth.

== Beauty & clothing collections ==
In 2011, Manuel released a women's clothing line for Sears Canada, called Attitude Jay Manuel. The line was ultimately discontinued prior to Sears Canada filing for creditor protection and ceasing operations in 2017.

Manuel's beauty range was launched with the support of supermodel-turned-entrepreneur Iman in 2015 and distributed by her company Impala Inc. According to an interview in Essence magazine, Manuel and Iman met during the 1990s when he was recommended to do Iman's makeup for a cover shoot.

Jay Manuel Beauty launched in 2014 and the collection consists of a range of products aimed to create a high definition finish, aimed at the younger generation. In numerous interviews Manuel has stated that he wanted to introduce products that gave an Instagram filter finish, without the need for a filter. In March 2015 Jay Manuel beauty was launched on HSN. In July 2016, it was announced that the beauty range would debut on the UK's QVC shopping channel in September of that year.

=== Retail ===
The first location opened November 16, Garden City, NY, with more Simon-based locations to open during 2018. Women's Wear Daily estimated that the success of the brand could lead to revenues of $1 million from this store's first year. The concept behind each of the stores was to improve the experience of the shopper. This would be done through a variety of techniques, including technology drives to improve customer experience.

However, no additional stores opened as planned. By 2019, the Roosevelt Field Mall location had closed, the brand's Instagram account (@jaymanuelbeauty) posted its last content in March 2019, and jaymanuelbeauty.com began redirecting to jaymanuel.com (no longer selling products). The brand is now inactive, with products available only via resale.

Instead of going down the traditional makeup route of signing a partnership with a department store or a well-known retailer like Sephora, Jay Manuel Beauty would operate physical stores. They would be known as the "Jay Manuel Beauty Retail Experience." This was the first time the brand was available at a physical location. Previously all the Jay Manuel Beauty products had been available for purchase via the Home Shopping Network and QVC only.

== Philanthropy ==
Manuel serves as a Smile Ambassador for Operation Smile and is actively involved with Dress for Success.

He has hosted the GLAAD Media Awards and also hosted Fashion Cares in Toronto, which benefits AIDS research. Manuel also hosted the American Image Awards, benefitting the Boys and Girls Clubs of America.

== Filmography ==
- Reality Check: Inside America's Next Top Model (2026)
- Live Broadcast of the Wedding of Prince Harry and Meghan Markle for BBC / Britbox (2018)
- Miss Universe 2017 (2017)
- Fashion News Live (Vintage) (2016-2017)
- Entertainment Tonight (2016)
- Fashion News Live (2006-2016)
- Patti LaBelle's Place (2016)
- The Wendy Williams Show (2011, 2015)
- The Meredith Vieira Show (2015)
- Fashion Rocks (2014)
- NBC’s Today Show (2014)
- FNL's Flashback Friday (2014)
- CBS This Morning (2013)
- CTV's Live Oscar Red Carpet (2013)
- The View (2013)
- NBC's Open House (2013)
- America's Next Top Model (2003-2012)
- CTV's The Marilyn Denis Show (2011, 2012)
- Access Hollywood (2010, 2011)
- Alexis Joy VIP Access (2011)
- The Nate Berkus Show (2011)
- Fashion Police (2006 - 2010)
- CNN The Joy Behar Show (2010)
- Degrassi Takes Manhattan (2010)
- Being Erica (2010)
- Project Runway (2010)
- The Tyra Banks Show (2007-2010)
- Teenage Paparazzo (2010)
- MTV’s When I Was 17 (2010)
- Canada's Next Top Model (2006-2009)
- Style Her Famous (2006-2009)
- E!: Live from the Red Carpet (2006-2009)
- BET's 106 & Park (2009)
- Chelsea Lately (2009)
- Giuliana and Bill (2009)
- Operation Fabulous (2009)
- Loose Women (2008)
- Live! with Kelly (2008)
- Paula's Party (2008)
- GLAAD Media Awards (2007)
- Peep: A Fashion Cares Special (2007)
- Much Music Video Music Awards (2006, 2007)
- Dress My Nest (2007)
- E! True Hollywood Story (2005, 2006)
- I Love the '80s 3-D (2005)-Commentator
- Exposed: 25 Most Notorious Moments of Fashion Week (2005)
- Eve (2005)
