= Jeanne Beker =

Canadian writer and television personality (born 1952)

Jeanne Beker CM
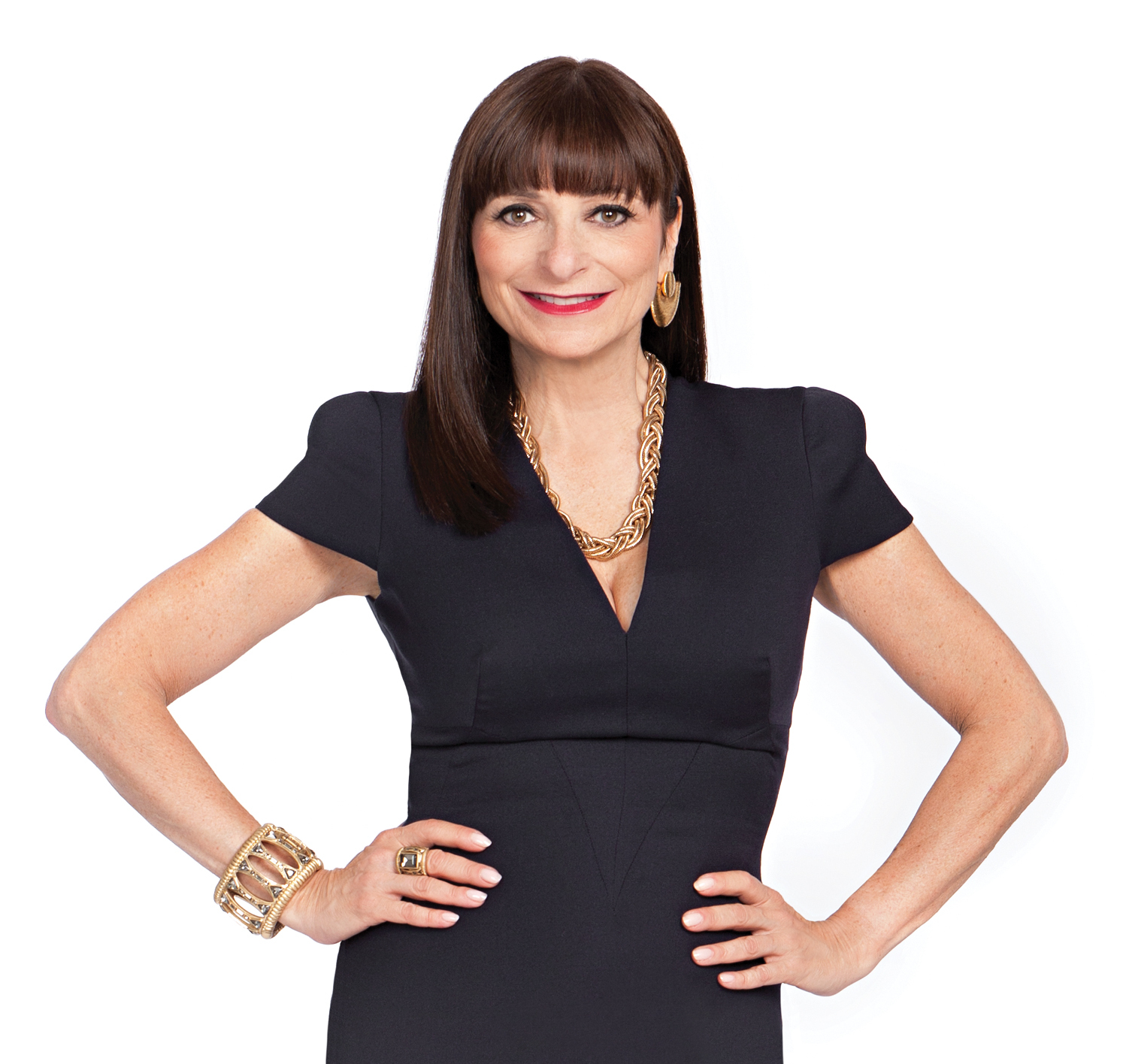
- Beker in 2011
- Born: 19 March 1952 (age 74); Toronto, Ontario, Canada
- Occupations: Fashion reporter, author, TV personality
- Years active: 1978–present

Jeanne Beker, CM (/ˈdʒiːni ˈbɛkər/; born 19 March 1952) is a Canadian television personality, fashion editor, and author.

== Family ==
Jeanne Beker was born in Toronto, Ontario to father Joseph Beker and mother Bronia Beker, two Jewish Holocaust survivors born in Kozova, Poland (now in Ukraine) who immigrated to Canada from a displaced persons camp in Austria. Jeanne was previously (from 1986 to 1998) married to Toronto radio personality Bob Magee, but is now divorced. They have two daughters together.

== Early life ==
She attended high school at William Lyon Mackenzie Collegiate Institute. She first launched her career as an actor, landing a role in the CBC Television sitcom Toby in 1968. She subsequently entered the theatre program at York University, and then went to Paris to study mime under Étienne Decroux. She then returned to Canada, working for CBC Radio as an arts and entertainment reporter in St. John's while pursuing her theatrical career.

== Journalism career ==
Beker returned to Toronto in 1978, producing daily lifestyle and entertainment features for 1050 CHUM. She launched Citytv's ground-breaking music magazine show The NewMusic in 1979 as co-host with J. D. Roberts and also became an entertainment reporter for CityPulse. She briefly hosted Rockflash news segments on MuchMusic when that station was launched, hosted MovieTelevision, and produced segments for Entertainment Tonight.

In 1995, Beker launched @Fashion, the Internet's first-ever fashion website, for American communication giant MCI.

From 1985 to 2012 Beker hosted FashionTelevision, the role with which she is most famously associated. Beker hosted the program and acted as a segment producer for the entirety of the program run. Beker announced that the program had ceased production in 2012, via Twitter, stating: "This dream is over: After 27 glorious years, FT production ceased today." Canadian born celebrity stylist Brad Goreski paid tribute to Beker and the program upon hearing the news of its cancellation, saying: "She reported from the shows in Milan and New York with such intensity – as if she was a war correspondent reporting from the front lines."

From 2012 to 2014 Beker hosted fashion and entertainment segments for Bell Media properties including CTV News, Canada AM and The Marilyn Denis Show. Simultaneously, Beker wrote articles on fashion and style for the Toronto Star, The Kit and The Loop.

Beker is currently a columnist for The Globe and Mail.

== Fashion entrepreneurship ==
From 2001 to 2002, Beker had her own limited edition fashion lines, "Jeanne Beker" for Eaton's, and "Inside Out by Jeanne Beker" with Sears Canada.

Beginning in 2010, Beker released a clothing line entitled 'Edit by Jeanne Beker' at The Bay of which she directly curates a collection of designer clothing for Fall/Winter and Spring/Summer seasons.

In 2013, Beker released a line of footwear with retailer The Shoe Company and a line of eyewear through FYSH UK.

In 2014, Beker launched a capsule collection of clothing, fashion jewelry and eyewear with Rogers Media electronic retailer The Shopping Channel. In 2015, Beker launched the weekly live television program Style Matters with Jeanne Beker for The Shopping Channel, in which she presents interviews and trend stories about Shopping Channel retailers while also selling product live on air.

== Books ==
- Jeanne Unbottled: Adventures in High Style (2001, Stoddart, ISBN 0-7737-3266-7)
- The Big Night Out (2005, Tundra Books, ISBN 978-0-88776-719-7)
- Passion for Fashion: Careers in Style (2008, Tundra Books, ISBN 978-0-88776-800-2)
- Strutting It!: The Grit Behind the Glamour (2011, Tundra Books, ISBN 978-1-77049-224-0)
- Finding Myself in Fashion (2011, Penguin Group, ISBN 978-0-670-06457-1)

== Editor-in-chief ==
From 2003 to 2009, Beker was the editor-in-chief of FQ Magazine and SIR, published by Kontent Group in Toronto. A Citytv documentary series entitled Cover Stories debuted in 2006, following Beker and the Kontent Group team as they publish each issue of FQ. The series currently re-runs on FashionTelevisionChannel.

== Exclusives and features ==
In January 2008, Beker landed an exclusive interview with designer Valentino before the designer announced his retirement from the fashion world. The interview was turned into an authorized biography special which later aired on CTV and FashionTelevisionChannel.

In February 2010, Beker joined eTalk hosts Tanya Kim and Ben Mulroney, along with reporters Leah Miller and Lainey, in Vancouver to cover the 2010 Olympic Winter Games for CTV. On 9 February 2010, she carried the Olympic flame during the Torch Relay in Ladner, British Columbia.

Beker has served as a judge on Canadian reality television show Canada's Next Top Model for the past three cycles and appeared in an episode of the Rick Mercer Report that aired on 3 November 2009.

Most recently, Beker serves as a judge on the revival season of Project Runway Canada (2025).

== Awards ==
Beker was an honorary chair of Toronto's annual Fashion Cares, one of the world's largest HIV/AIDS fundraising events. She is also on the honorary board of Gilda's Club and has been involved with numerous charitable organizations over the years. In 2006, she was honoured with the prestigious "Crystal" lifetime achievement award by Women in Film and Television. Beker was awarded the Vantage Women of Originality Award, and was also the recipient of the Variety Club Diamond Award.

Beker received the Special Academy Achievement Award (for exceptional contributions to Canadian TV) from the Canadian Academy of Cinema and Television in 2013.

She was designated a member of the Order of Canada in December 2013.

Beker was awarded The Hollywood Reporter Women in Entertainment Canada's IMPACT Award on May 29, 2025.
