= Gagliano (surname) =

Gagliano (Italian: [gaʎˈʎaːno]) is an Italian surname. Notable people with the surname include:

- Tony Gagliano (born 1958) Canadian businessman and philanthropist
- Alessandro Gagliano (c. 1700–1735), Italian luthier
- Angel Gagliano (born 1950), Argentine athlete
- Alfonso Gagliano (1942–2020), Canadian accountant and politician
- Bob Gagliano (born 1958), former American Football player
- Fernando Gagliano (c. 1770–1795), Italian luthier
- Gaetano Gagliano (1917–2016), Italian-Canadian businessman
- Januarius Gagliano (c. 1740–1780), Italian luthier
- Leonardo Gagliano (20th century), Brazilian radio speaker and sports commentator
- Marco da Gagliano (1582–1643), Italian composer
- Nicolò Gagliano (c. 1740–1780), Italian violin-maker
- Phil Gagliano (1941–2016), former Major League Baseball infielder
- Ralph Gagliano (born 1946), Major League Baseball player
- S. Thomas Gagliano (1931–2019), American politician
- Tommy Gagliano (1884–1951), Sicilian-American mobster
- Rico Gagliano, American journalist and podcaster
