= Galliani =

Galliani is a surname. Notable people with the surname include:

- Adrian Galliani (born 2001), American soccer player; grandson of Adriano
- Adriano Galliani (born 1944), Italian entrepreneur and football executive
- Andrea Galliani (born 1988), Italian male volleyball player
- Emanuela Galliani, Italian amateur astronomer
- Guillermo Arbulú Galliani (1921–1997), Peruvian general and politician

== See also ==
- Gagliani, surname
- Galliane, part of a musical instrument
- Galliano (disambiguation)
