= Galeano =

Galeano may refer to:

- David Galeano Olivera (born 1961), Paraguayan linguist, anthropologist, philologist, and educator
- Eduardo Galeano (1940–2015), Uruguayan journalist, writer and novelist
- Elida Galeano (born 1965), Nicaraguan politician
- Gloria Galeano Garcés (1958–2016), Colombian botanist and agronomist
- Leonel Galeano (born 1991), Argentine football player
- Maneco Galeano (1945–1980), Paraguayan musician
- Marcos Aurélio Galeano (born 1972), Brazilian football player
- Subcomandante Insurgente Galeano, previously known as Subcomandante Marcos
- Juan Benítez Galeano (born 1953)
- Carlos Galeano (born 1950)
- Fermin Galeano (born 1975)
- José Jaime Galeano (1945–2021)
- Juan Daniel Galeano (born 1986)
- Luis Galeano

== See also ==
- Galiano (disambiguation)
- Galliano (disambiguation)
- Gagliano (disambiguation)
