= Thomas Rosica =

20th and 21st-century American Catholic priest

The Reverend Thomas Michael Rosica C.S.B.
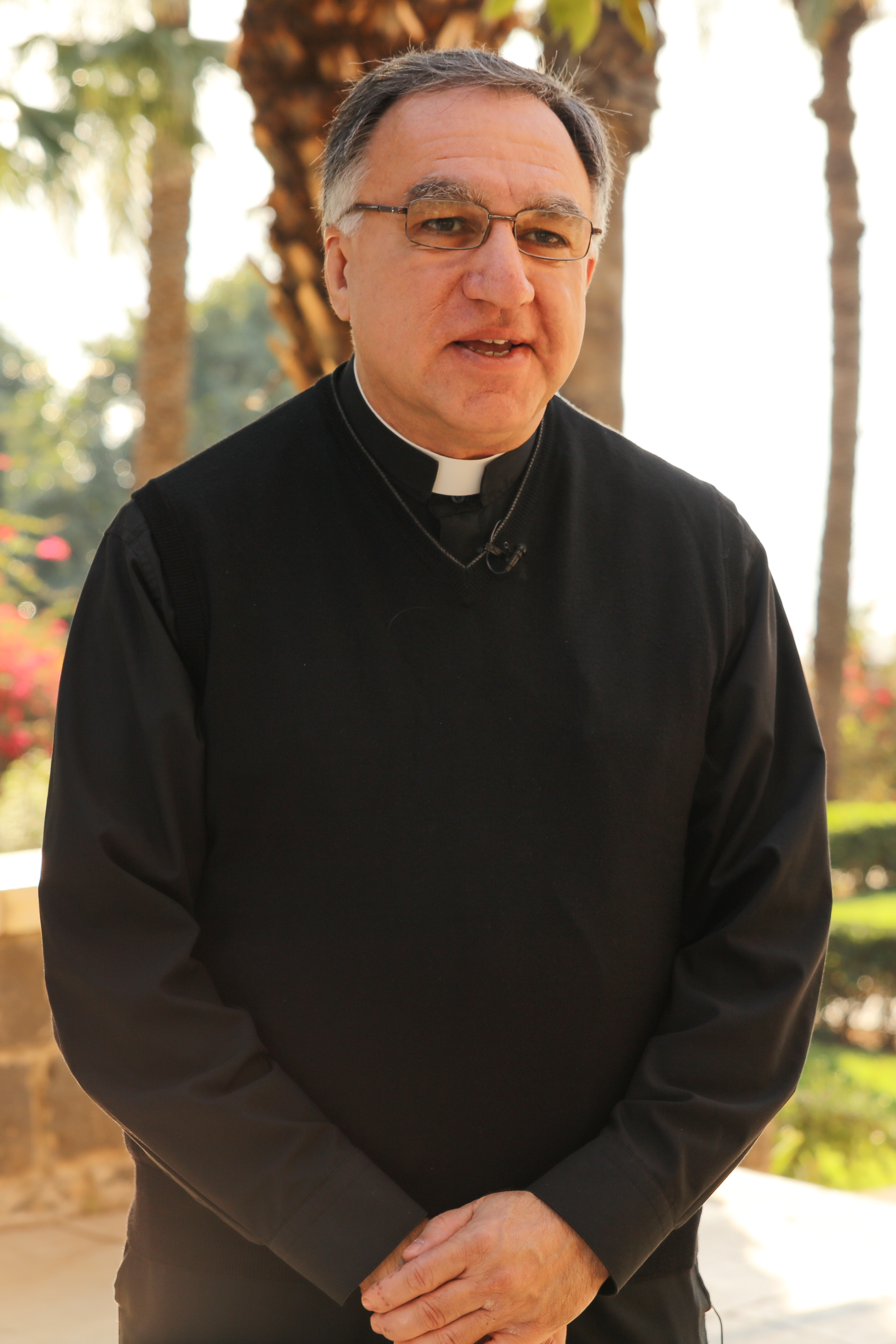
- Church: Catholic, Latin Church
- Previous posts: CEO, Salt and Light Catholic Media Foundation; Media Attaché, Holy See Press Office; President, Assumption University

Orders
- Ordination: 19 April 1986

Personal details
- Born: 3 March 1959 (age 67) Rochester, New York, US
- Occupation: Catholic priest
- Education: St. John Fisher College; Regis College; Pontifical Biblical Institute; École Biblique et Archéologique Française de Jérusalem

Thomas Michael Rosica, C.S.B. (born March 3, 1959) is an American Catholic priest, author, and Basilian Father. He was formerly chief executive officer of Salt + Light Catholic Media Foundation, English-language media attaché of the Holy See Press Office, and president of Assumption University in Windsor, Ontario. He resigned from Salt + Light and other positions in 2019 following substantiated allegations of plagiarism.

== Education ==
Rosica has an undergraduate degree in French and Italian from St. John Fisher College, in Pittsford, New York. He then entered the Congregation of St. Basil as a novice and studied theology and sacred scripture at Regis College in Toronto. He continued his studies in theology and scripture at the Pontifical Biblical Institute in Rome, and then École Biblique et Archéologique Française de Jérusalem.

== Career ==
Rosica was appointed by the Canadian Conference of Catholic Bishops as the national director and chief executive officer of the 17th World Youth Day 2002 in Toronto. The theme of the World Youth Day was "You are the salt of the earth... you are the light of the world." Shortly after the World Youth Day, Thomas Rosica was approached by the founder of St. Joseph Communications, Gaetano Gagliano, to run a religious television network. The new television station was named "Salt + Light Television" after the theme of the World Youth Day 2002 and began its broadcast on July 1, 2003 with only two employees.

Rosica served as the Vatican's English language spokesperson for the transition in the papacy during February and March, 2013 and as media advisor at the Vatican for the October 2018 Synod of Bishops.

=== Assumption University ===
Roscia served as President of Assumption University in Windsor, Ontario beginning in 2011.

== Controversies ==
=== Plagiarism and retracted publications ===
Since 2015, Rosica has regularly been accused of plagiarism in his publications, blog postings, and speeches. On February 17, 2015 Rosica issued a cease and desist letter against David Domet, of the Catholic blog Vox Cantoris, accusing the blogger of having made false and defamatory statements.

In February 2019, Rosica stepped down from the governing boards of University of St. Michael's College in Toronto, St. John Fisher College in New York and University of St. Thomas in Houston because of plagiarism accusations. In March 2019, Rosica went on sabbatical from the Salt and Light Catholic Media Foundation; he resigned as CEO in June. That same month, the Canadian Conference of Catholic Bishops announced that it had retracted Rosica's works published by the CCCB because the works "failed to provide all the appropriate citations, as well as bibliographic references, and did not acknowledge a number of original sources". Rosica took full responsibility for the "lack of oversight."

In 2020, Rosica's plagiarism was found to extend to text that he ghostwrote for Cardinal Marc Ouellet.

In 2022, new plagiarism accusations were brought against Rosica concerning two new articles published in Il Sismografo, a Vatican-based news aggregator.

=== Sexual assault allegation ===
A lawsuit filed in Ontario, Canada, in 2024 accused Father Thomas Rosica of sexually abusing a younger priest more than two decades ago.
