= MoneySense =

Canadian finance and lifestyle magazine

- Categories: Business
- Total circulation: 111,811 (December 2011)
- Founded: 1999
- First issue: September 1999
- Final issue: December 2016 (print)
- Company: Ratehub
- Country: Canada
- Based in: Toronto
- Language: English
- Website: www.moneysense.ca
- ISSN: 1488-1349

MoneySense is a Canadian online personal finance and lifestyle magazine published by Ratehub.

== History and profile ==
MoneySense was founded by Rogers Media in 1999 and started publishing in September 1999. It covers articles on personal finance and targets both men and women.

In 2009 MoneySense launched a new website to distinguish its brand within Rogers Publishing and to address navigation challenges their customers were having with the old site. The site launch was sponsored by TD Canada Trust. Prior to this, MoneySense was merged with the Canadian Business and Profit under the CB Online brand banner.

In 2016 Rogers Media announced it was moving four publications, including Moneysense, Flare, Sportsnet and Canadian Business to a digital, online format. A significant cut back to its publishing division. The print edition was terminated in December 2016 and since January 2017, it has been published only online.

In 2018 it was reported that Rogers was looking to sell MoneySense along with Maclean's, Canadian Business, Today's Parent, Hello! Canada, Flare and Chatelaine in a single bundle. This was announced approximately two months after approximately 75 people were laid off.

Rogers sold the publication to Ratehub, a Toronto-based financial technology company, in 2018.
