= Galiano =

Galiano may refer to:

- Galiano Island, an island of British Columbia, Canada
- Galiano (surname)
- HMCS Galiano, a Royal Canadian Navy patrol vessel
- Galiano (Luzon), a former small town at a powerplant between Mount Lomboy and Mount Bilbil, on Luzon island, Philippines, that was site of World War II fighting

== See also ==
- Galliano (disambiguation)
- Gagliano (disambiguation)
- Galeano (disambiguation)
