= Fashion (magazine) =

Canadian fashion magazine

- August 2013 cover featuring Demi Lovato
- Editor: Bernadette Morra
- Former editors: John MacKay
- Categories: Fashion magazine
- Frequency: Monthly (7 per year)
- Total circulation (December 2011): 142,016
- Founded: 1977
- Company: St. Joseph Communications
- Country: Canada
- Based in: Toronto
- Language: English
- Website: www.fashionmagazine.com
- ISSN: 1714-9835

FASHION is a Canadian fashion magazine published by St. Joseph Communications. Established in 1977, it is currently based in Toronto with satellite offices in Vancouver and Montreal. It publishes 7 issues a year, and has a total readership of 800,000 (Vividata Fall 2022).

The magazine covers international, national, local fashion, beauty trends and news. Notable cover subjects have included Lady Gaga, Beyoncé, Rihanna, Zendaya, Hailey Bieber, Sydney Sweeney, Sadie Sink and Olivia Culpo.

In February 2020, FASHION transitioned from a traditional women’s magazine to a brand of all ages, sizes, genders, ethnicities, and orientations.

The magazine's first editor-in-chief was John MacKay, who had previously been responsible for Toronto Life's men's fashion supplements.

The current editor-in-chief is Bernadette Morra. Before joining FASHION, Morra spent 23 years at the Toronto Star, first as a fashion writer, then (since 1993) as fashion editor. She left The Star in 2008 to work as a freelance writer and joined FASHION in 2009.

FASHION's website launched in the summer of 2000. The site currently covers runway news, street style, fashion and beauty trends, Canadian designers and more. FASHION's website also has two sub-brands: The Drop: The Releases You Need To Know; and Texture Talk - which is devoted to hair of all curl types.

In July 2021, content from flare.com, which was a sister site to FASHION, migrated to FASHION's website and became a pillar on the site. In February 2023, the Flare brand dissolved and its content was absorbed into FASHION's website under the Culture section.

In June 2022, FASHION held the first annual Cake Mix, an invitation-only party that is a kick-off event for Pride month in Toronto. This same year FASHION added the tagline #UnapologeticallyOurselves to its mission statement to reflect the supportive and inclusive atmosphere of the brand.

FASHION and sister titles Chatelaine and Châtelaine hold an annual Beauty Awards which is the largest beauty awards competition in Canada.

St. Joseph Communications, the magazine's publisher, also publishes Toronto Life, Maclean's, Chatelaine, Hello! Canada, Quill & Quire, and Today's Parent.
