= IBwave Solutions =

Software company in Canada

iBwave Solutions
- Industry: software
- Services: telecom radio planning
- Parent: Corning Inc.

iBwave Solutions is a telecom radio planning software provider that develops software for the in-building wireless industry. iBwave is best known for its software iBwave Design, mostly used by telecom operators, system integrators and equipment vendors. iBwave is a Canadian-based company that was founded in 2003 and is headquartered in Montreal.

In 2010, iBwave is listed in the 22nd annual Profit 100 ranking of Canada's Fastest-Growing Companies by PROFIT Magazine. iBwave stands on the list in 16th position. iBwave also ranks 2nd in "Le Palmarès des Leaders de la croissance" which lists the fastest growing companies in the province of Quebec. Wind Mobile used iBwave in designing wireless coverage for Toronto PATH, an underground shopping complex. 2010, iBwave ranked the 178th Fastest Growing Company in North America in the Deloitte Technology Fast 500.

In March 2015 at the Mobile World Congress it was revealed Solutelia collaborated with iBwave to integrate iBwave Mobile and the WINd™ platform which are integrated via iBwave’s .ibwc interface.

iBwave was acquired by Corning Incorporated in April 2015.

In February 2020, Infovista and iBwave are partnering together to include a single indoor and outdoor wireless interface solution.
