= Gagliano =

Gagliano may refer to:

- Gagliano (surname)
- Gagliano family of luthiers
- Gagliano (town), an archaic local pronunciation of the town Aliano as referred to in the memoir Christ Stopped at Eboli
- Gagliano (grape), another name for the Italian wine grape Aglianico

== Places ==
- Gagliano Aterno, Abruzzo, Italy
- Gagliano Castelferrato, Sicily, Italy
- Gagliano del Capo, Lecce, Apulia, Italy
- Gagliano, Cividale del Friuli, part of the town of Cividale del Friuli, Italy

== See also ==
- Galliano (disambiguation)
- Galeano (disambiguation)
