= Salt + Light Television =

Catholic television channel in Canada

Salt + Light Media
- Salt + Light Media logo
- Country: Canada
- Broadcast area: Nationally; Worldwide
- Headquarters: Toronto, Ontario

Programming
- Picture format: 1080i (HDTV); 480i (SDTV)

Ownership
- Owner: Salt and Light Catholic Media Foundation
- Key people: Haig Chahinian (CEO)

History
- Launched: July 2003; 22 years ago
- Founder: Gaetano Gagliano

Links
- Website: slmedia.org

Salt + Light Television is a Canadian multi-lingual Category B television channel owned by the not-for-profit Salt and Light Catholic Media Foundation and based in Toronto, Ontario.

== Description ==
Logo used in French programming, Télévision Sel + Lumière.

The channel broadcasts faith-based programming for Catholics, which includes televised daily Mass, documentaries, live event coverage and talk shows. Programs are primarily broadcast in English, along with French (under the brand Sel + Lumière Média), Italian and Chinese languages.

== History ==
In November 2001, Paolo Canciani (later forming Canbo Broadcasting to operate the future channel) was granted approval from the Canadian Radio-television and Telecommunications Commission (CRTC) to launch Inner Peace Television Network. It was described as:

"a national ethnic Category 2 specialty television service devoted to providing religious programming from the single point-of-view of the Catholic faith. The service targeted Italian, Spanish, Portuguese, Polish, Filipino, English, and French-speaking audiences. In addition to religious programming, the service will offer a limited amount of programming dealing with social and humanitarian issues."

The channel launched in July 2003 as Salt + Light Television and was quickly spun-off as a non-profit company under the ownership of Salt and Light Catholic Media Foundation, a newly formed charitable organization ran by a board of directors, two of which were from the Gagliano family, who in turn controlled St. Joseph Printing Limited. Upon launch, the channel initially aired programming in English, French, Italian, Spanish, and Portuguese; which has since changed to its current language list. In addition to television, they offer a streaming service, Salt + Light Plus, offering on-demand access through Android, Apple iOS, Apple TV, Roku, Amazon Fire TV, and Salt + Light Plus.

The current name of the station derives itself from the theme of World Youth Day 2002, "You are the salt of the earth... you are the light of the world," part of the Sermon on the Mount. Prior to the current channel's launch, in 2002, ownership and control of the channel was transferred to a consortium, majority owned by St. Joseph Printing Limited.

On June 1, 2017, the channel announced that it would be launching a high definition (HD) feed on June 4, 2017, initially with Telus Optik TV. Gabriel Chow, the developer of the GCatholic.org, is a contributor (primarily Chinese language) to the channel.

Thomas Rosica, a priest from the United States, was the National Director of WYD 2002, was the chief executive officer of Salt + Light until his resignation under duress in 2019. The Jesuit priest Alan J. Fogarty succeeded him in 2020 and served until 2023. Alexander Du became interim CEO in November 2023. Haig Chahinian, a priest, began his tenure as CEO of Salt + Light Media on December 1, 2024.

== See also ==
- 2003 in Canadian television
- Salt and light metaphor
- CatholicTV
- Padre Pio TV
- Eternal Word Television Network
- H2onews
- Catholic television
- Catholic television channels
- Catholic television networks
- List of Canadian television channels
- Television in Canada
