= Hello! (magazine) =

UK weekly magazine

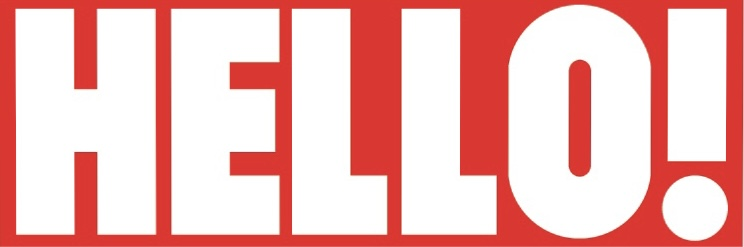

- December 2010 cover
- Editor: Rosie Nixon
- Categories: Celebrity
- Frequency: Weekly
- Total circulation: 72,922 (2025)
- First issue: 21 May 1988 (United Kingdom); 9 September 2006 (Canada)
- Company: Hello Ltd. (Spain)
- Country: United Kingdom
- Website: www.hellomagazine.com
- ISSN: 0214-3887
- OCLC: 0801408664

Hello! (stylized in all caps) is a royalist weekly magazine specializing in celebrity news and human-interest stories, first published in the United Kingdom on May 21, 1988, following the format of ¡Hola!, the Spanish weekly magazine. It often covers aristocrats, celebrities and royalty. Its editorial focus is illustrated by the fact that for 21 consecutive editions, straddling 2022 and 2023, it featured Catherine, Princess of Wales, on its cover; all involved flattering stories.

== Editions ==
Hello! was launched in 1988 by publisher Eduardo Sánchez Junco, owner and chairman of Spain's ¡Hola! magazine. ¡Hola! was created in 1944 by husband and wife Antonio Sánchez Gómez and Mercedes Junco Calderón.

In 2006, Rogers Media launched Hello! Canada. In 2007, the Madrid office reorganized and changed out the management for the Canadian version.

In 2019, St. Joseph Communications took over the publishing for Hello! Canada, together with other Canadian magazines such as Chatelaine, Maclean's, etc.

Hello! Thailand is a bi-weekly Thai lifestyle magazine targeted at women aged 21 and over, launched in March 2006. The magazine focuses on royal news, celebrity and entertainment features. Circulation peaked at 300,000 in 2006 and was at 100,000 copies nationwide in 2017.

Hello! Cyprus is a quarterly magazine based in Cyprus and published by Alpha Cyprus. Re-launched in 2026 under the editorial direction of Irene Christoforou, Hello! Cyprus is focused on lifestyle, global affairs, celebrity news and local news. Hello Cyprus! does not serve as a fast-paced magazine in contrast with other editions.

== Awards ==
- 2005 ACE, UK Magazine distributed Internationally, Winner
- 2004 PPA – Sales Pitch of the Year, Winner
- 2002 PPA – International Magazine of the Year, Winner
- 1999 BSME Awards, Best International Magazine, Winner.
- 1998 Marketing Week 20th Birthday Awards, Best Consumer Magazine, Winner
- 1996 The Press Circulation Awards – Consumer Magazine of the Year, short-listed
- 1995 International Press Directory – International Publishing Award to Eduardo Sánchez Junco
- 1992 The Press Circulation Awards – Circulation Excellence by a Consumer Magazine, Finalist
  - Media Week Press Advertising Awards – Consumer Magazine of the Year, Winner
  - The Publisher – Best Front Cover, Winner
  - PPA – Consumer Magazine of the Year, Highly Commended
- 1991 The Press Circulation Awards – Circulation Excellence by a Consumer Magazine, Winner
  - British Society of Magazine Editors – General Interest Magazine Editors of the Year, Winner
  - The Publisher Magazine Publishing Awards – Magazine of the Year, Runner-up
  - PPA – Consumer Magazine of the Year, Highly Commended
- 1990 PPA – Consumer Magazine of the Year, Winner
  - Media Week Advertising Awards – Consumer Magazine of the Year, Winner
  - The Press Circulation Awards – Greatest Annual Percentage and/or Copy Growth by a Consumer Magazine, Runner-up

== Litigation ==
- 2003: Catherine Zeta-Jones and Michael Douglas sued Hello! for publishing unauthorized photographs of their wedding. Rival magazine OK! had an exclusive contract for pictures of the wedding, and also sued Hello!. In November 2003, OK! was awarded £1,033,156 in damages, and Jones and Douglas received £14,600.
- 2006: Hello!, which secured the British rights to the first images of Brad Pitt and Angelina Jolie's newborn daughter, launched legal action with People against two websites that printed a leaked exclusive shot of the couple with their new baby daughter. The leaked photo, which contains Hello! magazine's logo, shows a headline which reads: "The biggest exclusive of the year. Angelina and Brad with their new Baby Shiloh Nouvel." People magazine reportedly paid more than US$4 million to secure the American rights.

== Website ==
Hellomagazine.com is the official website of the weekly celebrity news magazine Hello!. Started in 2001 to complement the magazine, the site is updated throughout the day, seven days a week.

=== History ===
Launched in April 2001, it is part of the larger Hello! brand, but contains completely separate content to the weekly magazine. It reports celebrity news on an hourly rather than weekly basis. Since it launched with the magazine's trademark color palette it has undergone a redesign of lighter tones. By January 2008 over 1.5 million readers were using hellomagazine.com.

=== Content ===
The site provides readers, about half of whom are women under 34, with photos, news stories and video content divided into the following categories: actors and actresses, musicians, fashion and models, royalty and statesmen, celebrities, health and beauty and travel.

Daily content ranges from coverage of the latest happenings in the lives of Hollywood stars like Brad Pitt and Tom Cruise to English talent such as Hugh Laurie and Keira Knightley. It features picture galleries of all the main fashion shows, special events such as The Oscars and an extensive list of quizzes on famous people.

The horoscope section was provided by British astrologer Jonathan Cainer. There are also visual news updates (News In Pix), profiles on musicians, actors and actresses and statesmen, short interviews and a mini-biography section focusing specifically on UK names.

It is known for its coverage of European royals, including branches of lesser known families.

Hellomagazine.com provides celebrity content to Yahoo!.

Online reader services include a news feed, a tickertape, social bookmarking and online shopping.
