= Châtelaine =

Canadian French-language magazine

- Categories: Women's magazine
- Frequency: Bi-monthly
- Total circulation (June 2013): 172,708
- Founded: 1960
- Company: St. Joseph Communications
- Country: Canada
- Based in: Montreal
- Language: French
- Website: fr.chatelaine.com
- ISSN: 0317-2635

Châtelaine is a French-language magazine of women's lifestyles, published in Quebec by St. Joseph Communications.

== History and profile ==
The magazine was first published in 1960 by Maclean-Hunter Publishing. It covers issues and interests of real concern to women, including food, health, style, home and current affairs. The magazine's headquarters is located in Montreal.

Châtelaine was published monthly until January 2017 when its frequency switched to bimonthly. Its English language version, Chatelaine, is published in Toronto.

Rogers Media announced on 30 September 2016 plans to sell off their French print media, including Châtelaine. On 20 March 2019, Rogers announced a deal to sell the magazine to St. Joseph Communications.
