= Gagliani =

Gagliani is a surname. Notable people with the surname include:

- Matteo Gagliani (1655–1717), Roman Catholic prelate
- Oliver Gagliani (1917–2002), American photographer, and educator

== See also ==
- Gagliano (disambiguation)
- Galliani, surname
