= Tellwell Talent =

Canadian publishing company

- Type: Private
- Industry: publishing
- Founded: 2015; 11 years ago
- Key people: Tim Lindsay
- Number of employees: 22 in 2018
- Website: www.tellwell.ca

Tellwell Talent (also known as "Tellwell Publishing" or simply "Tellwell") is a Canadian-based provider of publishing consulting, project management, editorial, design, illustration, marketing, and distribution services to assist authors in self-publishing.

== Platform ==
Tellwell Talent was founded in 2015. The company is headed by founder and CEO Tim Lindsay.

When authors work with Tellwell they must decide which services to purchase and include within the scope of services. With regards to distribution, authors can choose to either have Tellwell distribute the book for them through their “managed distribution” option or the author may distribute the book independently by working directly with print-on-demand and ebook platforms. Authors can also choose to use an ISBN provided by Tellwell or use their own ISBN. Authors retain copyright to their materials submitted and to the resulting book and grant Tellwell a license to use and, if applicable, distribute the author’s materials and book “solely as necessary in connection with the performance of the services purchased.”

Patricia Westerhof in her book The Canadian Guide to Creative Writing and Publishing lists Tellwell as an example of an “assisted self-publishing company.”

Tellwell Talent ranked in at #48 on the Canadian Business "Startup 50" list in 2019, which is a list of top new growth companies in the country.

In 2022 they were a finalist for the BBB’s Torch awards for ethics in business under the category of professional services.

== Notable publications ==
Notable publications include Baltimore Ravens Quarterback Lamar Jackson’s children’s book I Dream, You Dream, Let us Dream!, Presidential Lifetime Achievement Award winner Rita Kakati-Shah’s The Goddess of Go-Getting: Your Guide to Confidence, Leadership, and Workplace Success, Olympic Gold medalist Kyle Shewfelt’s Make It Happen: My Story of Gymnastics, the Olympics, and the Positive Power of Sport, and the first Prime Minister of St. Kitts and Nevis Sir Kennedy Alphonse Simmonds’ memoirs The Making of a National Hero. Other titles include Chelee Cromwell's Newbia, Jenn Bruer's Helping Effortlessly: A Book of Inspiration and Healing, Dave Carroll's Tom the Tomato Plant, and Gabriella Kikwaki's Between Two Worlds book series.
