= Bow frog =

End part of a stringed instrument's bow

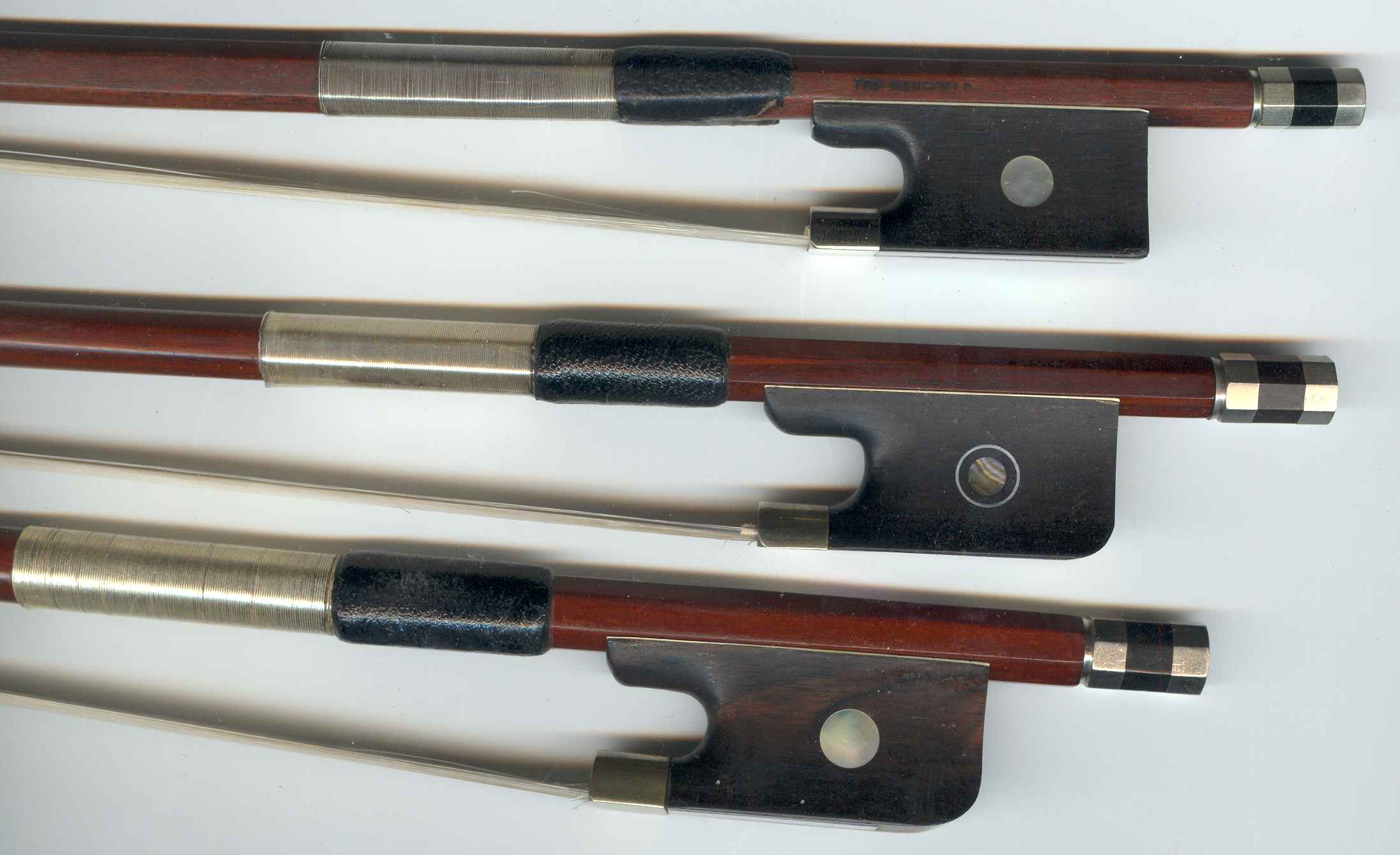
The frogs of a violin bow, viola bow and cello bow

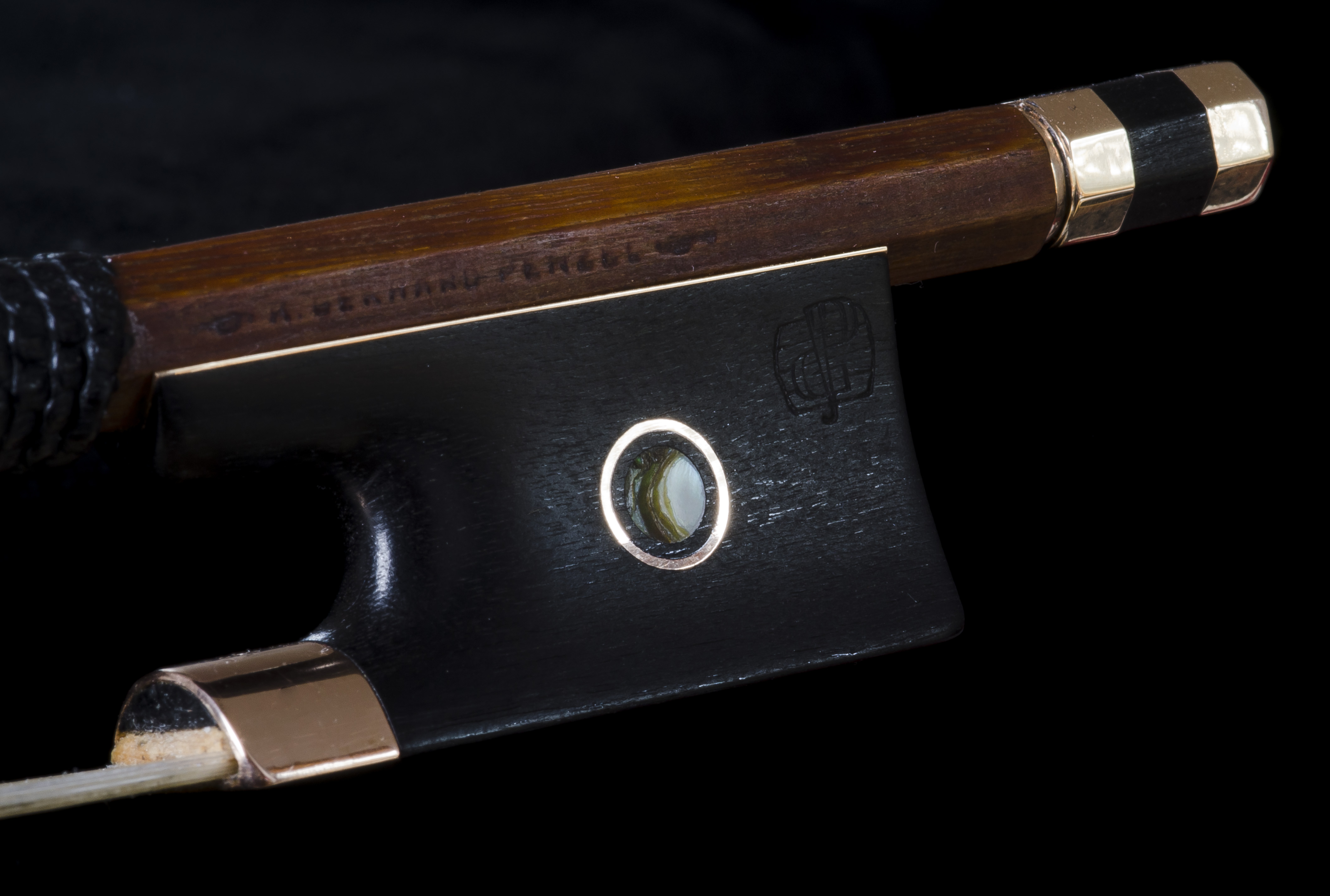
Close-up of frog of a violin bow (K. Gerhard Penzel)

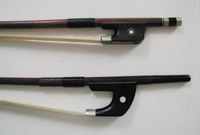
Frogs of the French and German double bass bows

The bow frog is the end part of a stringed musical instrument's bow that encloses the mechanism responsible for tightening and holding the bow hair ribbon. Most of the bow frogs used in today's classical bows are made of ebony; some synthetic bows have frogs made with materials that imitate ebony, while Baroque bows use frogs made with various woods.

== Etymology and names ==
The origin of the name frog is unknown, although it may derive from the use of the frock, the small device that bow makers use to shape it. It is also referred to as the "heel" or "nut" of the bow. It has been proposed that the name in English (and German) is by allusion to the shock-absorbing heel of a horse's hoof with the shock absorbing base of a horsehair bow. The German equivalent Frosch is the literal equivalent of "frog," while in French and Italian the equivalent of "heel" is used (talon and tallone). French also uses hausse. The foreign language terms sometimes appear in musical instructions, such as au talon, indicating to play with the bow near the frog. However, the English term is also used, such as in the Alfred edition of George Gershwin's An American in Paris, in which the violins and violas are instructed to play "near the frog" at bar 32.

== History ==
=== Early bows ===
During the earliest periods of music history, prior the Baroque era, the frog was a curved piece of wood affixed to the bow that served as a sort of rail to guide the hair ribbon and separate it from the stick. The bow hair was attached at both ends of the stick to the head and handle. The musician had to stretch and release the hair ribbon while playing in order to obtain the desired tension.

=== Baroque bows ===
The first attempt to mechanically adjust the hair tension came with the "crémaillère", a notch and hook system that pulled the hair ribbon by cranking the frog back and released it while moving forward. This uneasy device added considerable weight to the bow and was seldom used, but the concept for a new mechanical function of the frog was progressing.

With Baroque bows the frog was made with either the same wood as the stick or ivory. The woods typically used were common exotic woods, such as snakewood (amourette). During this time bow makers began carving the ivory, shifting their focus to the frog's aesthetic beauty.

A major improvement came with the screw and eyelet system, beginning in the 18th century. This was used in the workshop of Antonio Stradivari, and became the standard with the transition bow, exemplified by the Cramer bow.

=== Tourte and the classical bow ===
François Xavier Tourte pioneered the modern classical bow in the second half of the 18th and early 19th centuries. Tourte, with suggestions from the virtuoso violinist G. B. Viotti, improved upon the limitations of the Baroque bow. Previously a clockmaker, Tourte added a great deal of precision to the art of bow making. One example was his perfection of the screw and eyelet system; a ferrule circling the frog tongue and hair ribbon that worked as a guide to flatten and widen the bow hair.

Tourte also viewed the frog as a precious item and worked with ebony, gold, and tortoise shell. He standardized the use of ornamentation, such as the inlay of a pearl eye on each side of the frog, and covered mechanical parts with a pearl slide.

=== After Tourte ===
In the generations that followed Tourte, ebony became the new standard material for frogs, Nicolas Lupot built upon Tourte's model to add the metallic underslide that reinforced the fragile ebony edges.

Jacques LaFleur (1757–1853) devised a method of attaching the hair that suppressed the need for the conventional mortise, plug, and wedge.

In Paris, Jean-Baptiste Vuillaume introduced an oval ferrule that allowed the hair ribbon to widen and flatten as the violinist augmented the pressure.

=== 20th century and beyond ===
The attention given to the beauty of the bow frog continued throughout centuries, particularly with the use of tortoiseshell in the 19th and first part of the 20th century, like famous "tortoiseshell-mounted Hill bow, made by Barnes in the early 1920" (Ariane Todes, The Strad, 2012), until the use of tortoiseshell was regulated by CITES.

Jean-Jacques Millant was the first bow maker to split the frog into two parts: the throat remains permanently attached to the stick, while the body of the frog is detached and moveable, in order to tighten the hair. The purpose of this invention was to always keep the leather grip and the frog at the same distance.

A number of other innovations occurred throughout the 20th century, all attempts to modernize the frog's appearance. Yet the Tourte model of more than three centuries remained the standard, until the introduction of the Galliane frog in 2012 by bow maker Benoît Rolland. While Galliane proposed a new look, its primary purpose was a new functionality for the frog, giving a helicoidal shape to the bow hair that follows the natural movement of the string player's arm.
