= Eduardo Sánchez Junco =

Spanish magazine publisher (1943–2010)

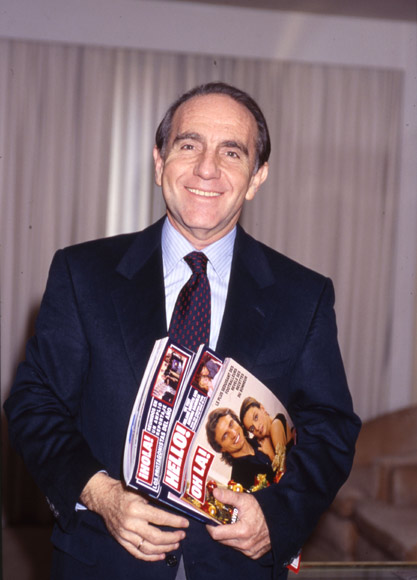
- Born: Eduardo Manuel Sánchez Junco; 26 April 1943; Palencia, Spain
- Died: 14 July 2010 (aged 67); Madrid, Spain
- Occupations: Editor, journalist, businessman
- Spouse: María del Carmen Pérez Villota
- Children: María del Carmen Sánchez Pérez; Mercedes Sánchez Pérez; Eduardo Sánchez Pérez

Eduardo Sánchez Junco (26 April 1943 – 14 July 2010) was a Spanish magazine publisher. He spent his childhood in Barcelona, where his father, Antonio Sánchez Gómez (1911–1984), was the editor of newspaper La Prensa. In their living room at home on 8 September 1944, Junco's father and mother, Mercedes Junco Calderón (1920–2019), came up with the idea for ¡Hola! magazine.

Eduardo, just a year old when the magazine was launched, studied agricultural engineering in school. While he always maintained a strong interest in this subject, he also felt drawn to his parents' profession, and joined his father at work on ¡Hola!, by then already well-known.

Following his father's death in 1984, Junco took over the business. While bringing up their three children – daughters Mamen and Cheleles, and son Eduardo – he and his wife, Mamen Pérez Villota, together studied for degrees in journalism. Junco launched Hello! magazine, a British branch of ¡Hola!.

As a result of Junco's work, fourteen countries have national variants of ¡Hola!, including Russia, Turkey, Thailand, the United Arab Emirates, Greece, Morocco, Canada, India, Malaysia, Mexico, Serbia, and Brazil. Published in ten different languages, the magazine is exported to a total of 70 countries, where it is read by about 12 million people each week, making it one of the most-read publications in the world. There are also online editions, hola.com – the leading women's-interest internet portal, with 60 million page hits per month – and its English-language version, hellomagazine.com.

Junco was recognised with several awards. Among them are the European Forum's Gold Medal, the Gold Medal from the Queen Sofia Spanish Institute in New York, and the Luca de Tena prize, presented to him by the King of Spain, as well as the International Press Directory's International Publishing Award.

All three of his children, as well as his mother and his wife, have played key editorial roles.
