= H2onews =

- Type: Limited
- Founder: Jesus Colina; Silvia Costantini; Miriam Diez Bosch; Andrea Scorzoni
- Headquarters: Rome, Italy
- Area served: Worldwide
- Services: Catholic Multimedia Information, Medias Production
- Number of employees: 40
- Website: h2onews.org

H2onews is a Catholic multimedia production agency established in 2006 with headquarters located in Rome, Italy.

== Description ==
H2onews creates and distributes multimedia news about the life of the Church and social or cultural events that directly pertain to Catholics living in the world. The news is produced in nine languages:

- Italian
- English
- Spanish
- French
- Portuguese
- German
- Hungarian
- Arabic
- Chinese

The agency uses a correspondents network around the world and an assembly/production platform in Rome. After translations and video assembly, the news is uploaded on the internet site or directly sent to the main partners. The videos are also available on the H2onews iPhone application. H2onews is also one of the creators of the Vatican's Channel on YouTube.

== Project Genesis ==
H2onews was born during the First World Congress of Catholic Television in Madrid in October 2006, hosted by the Pontifical Council for Social Communications. H2onews springs from the Pope's request to use modern methods of communication for evangelization and promoting peace and development (cfr. World Social Communications Day, May 8, 2005).

== Name ==
H2O is the chemical formula for water, a vital element. In Christian tradition, water is a symbol of life, purification, salvation and renewal.

== Partners ==
Catholic information producers or Catholic TV are the main partners of H2onews. The most important are:

- Vatican Television Center
- Vatican Radio
- Salt + Light Television
- Popular television
- KTO
- EWTN
- Cançao Nova

== Editorial Philosophy ==
H2onews takes a Catholic point of view based on the official position of the Church's authorities.

== See also ==
- Catholic television
- Catholic television channels
- Catholic television networks
