= Glow (magazine) =

Canadian beauty and health magazine

glow
- Editor: Tania Kwong
- Categories: Beauty, Health
- Frequency: Eight times a year
- Publisher: St. Joseph Communications
- Founded: 2002
- Company: Shoppers Drug Mart
- Country: Canada
- Language: English
- Website: www.glow.ca
- ISSN: 1702-8396

glow is a Canadian beauty and health magazine founded in 2002 and published eight times a year.

glow also has two sister magazines glow health and teen glow as well as a French version pure.

glow was shuttered in March 2017.

== History and profile ==
glow was founded in 2002. The magazine was part of Shoppers Drug Mart. It was published by Rogers Communications in Toronto from its start to 2011. St. Joseph Communications re-launched the magazine as a publisher with the May 2012 issue as "Canada's Beauty Expert". The magazine featured super model Daria Werbowy on the cover and showcased a new design and direction led by creative director Daniel MacKinnon. The magazine was published eight times a year along with a French version Pure. It focused on beauty, fashion and health along with celebrity profiles.

In May 2017, glow shut down its print and digital editions.
