= Castello di Gagliano Aterno =

Coordinates: 42.1270°N 13.6990°E

Castle of Gagliano Aterno
- Castello di Gagliano Aterno
- Gagliano Aterno
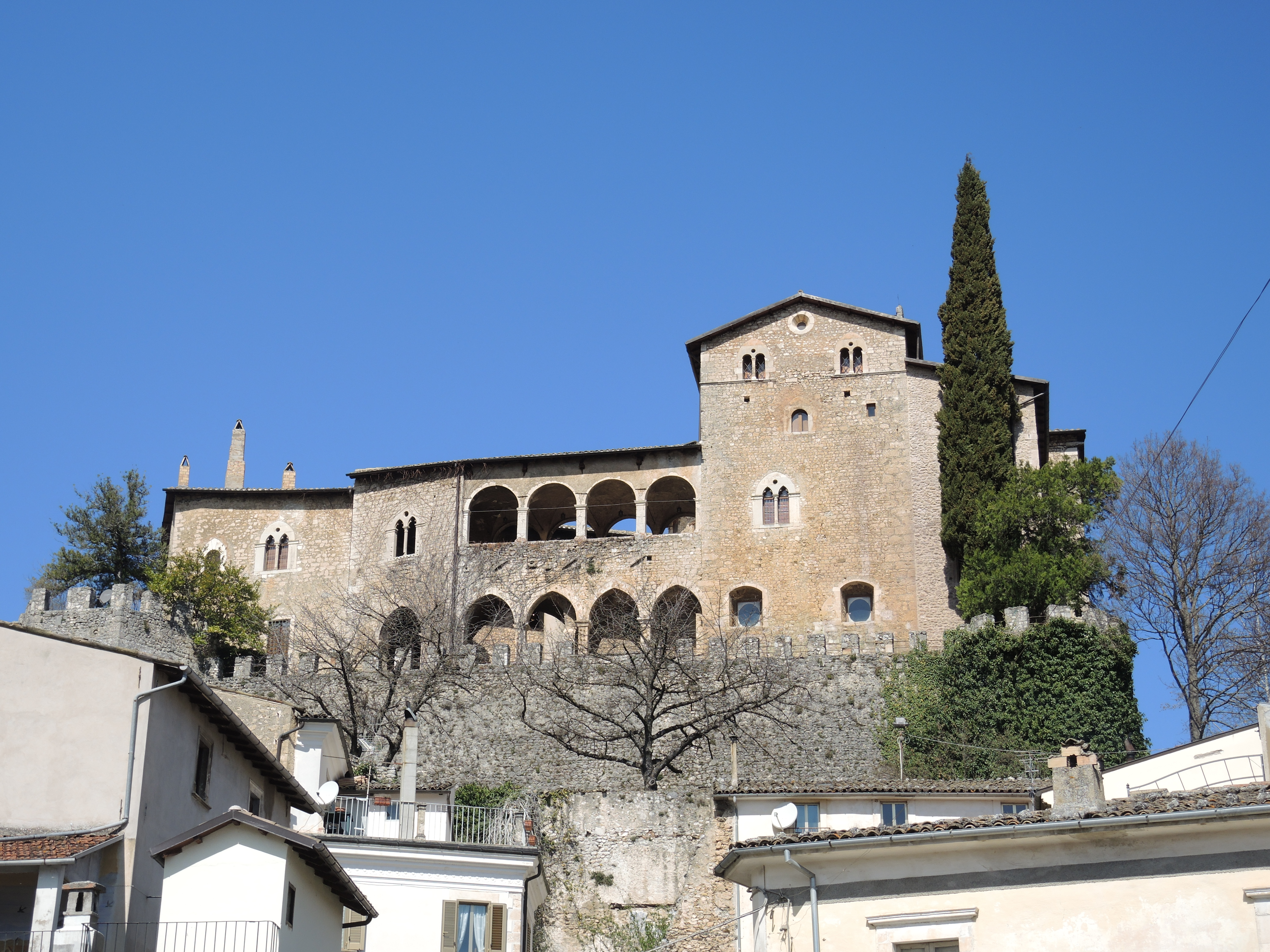
- Castle in Gagliano Aterno

Site information
- Type: Castle

Location

Site history
- Built: 1328

Castello di Gagliano Aterno (Italian for Castle of Gagliano Aterno) is a Middle Ages castle in Gagliano Aterno, Province of L'Aquila (Abruzzo).

== History ==
The castle of Gagliano Aterno was constructed between the late 12th century and early 13th century by the Berardi, known as the Counts of Marsi, once they came into possession of the County of Celano in 1143, to which the fief belonged. It was expanded in 1328 by Countess Isabella d'Aquino. The fief of Gagliano Aterno, along with its castle, followed the fortunes of the county and over time was inherited directly by various members of the Berardi house and then by its derivative families, first the Ocre family and later the Celano family. Specifically, the castle primarily followed the lineage of Odorisio of Ocre, son of Offreduzio, then the succession: Oddone da Celano; Pietro, Riccardo, and Nicolò da Celano; Ruggero da Celano; Tommaso da Celano; Ruggero da Celano; Pietro, Matteo, and Paolo da Celano; Nicolò da Celano, eventually converging in his last daughter Jacovella da Celano. Through her third marriage, she brought the castle as a dowry to her husband Lionello of the Accrocciamuro family and then to their firstborn son Ruggero Accrocciamuro. From November 15 to 17, 1462, the castle was damaged and looted during the siege by Jacopo Piccinino and his army, in collusion with Ruggero Accrocciamuro, who sought to force his mother Jacovella da Celano, who had taken refuge inside, to recognize his feudal succession rights over the County of Celano. The fief of Gagliano Aterno, along with the castle, passed the following year to Antonio Piccolomini d'Aragona, who repaired it and added two defensive walls. Subsequently, it passed to the Barberini and then to the Sciarra-Colonna, who held it until 1806, when it was acquired by the Pietropaoli family, eventually ending up with the Lazzaroni family. The castle is used as a private residence, but parts of the ground floor are open to visitors.

== Architecture ==
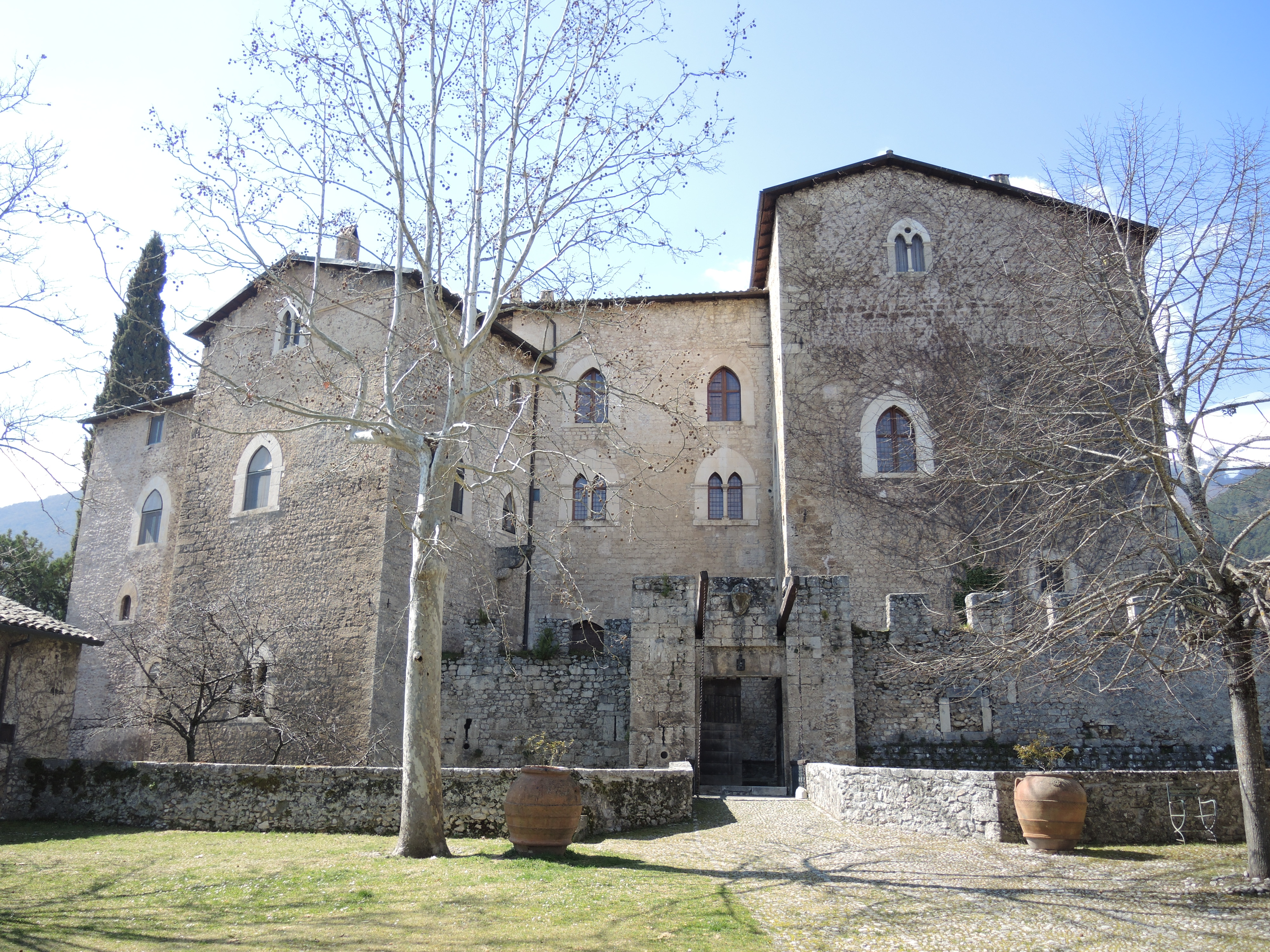
Entrance to the castle via a drawbridge

The castle is characterized by two rings of walls: the inner one is accessible via a drawbridge that crosses a moat. At the corners, there are three cylindrical towers for reinforcement, along with a polygonal tower. Beyond the battlements, the residential palace unfolds, consisting of several buildings arranged around an inner courtyard equipped with a well and surrounded by a portico and a small loggia on the first floor, accessible by an open staircase. During the transformation of the castle into an aristocratic residence, the windows were enlarged, and a two-level loggia overlooking the town below was created, with pointed arches in the inner courtyard and round arches on the first floor.
