= St. Joseph Communications =

Toronto telecommunications company

St. Joseph Communications (SJC) is a Canadian communications company based in Toronto.

== History ==
St. Joseph Communications was founded in 1956 by Gaetano Gagliano as a printing house. Gagliano and his growing family emigrated from Italy shortly after the war. He initially found work laying track for CP Rail, but could not forget about his lifelong dream of becoming a printer. So in 1956, he started a small print business in the basement of his family home. He specialized in letterpress work such as birth announcements, invitations and business cards. He expanded business through new equipment and technology, strategic acquisitions and bigger facilities. By the 1980s, St. Joseph Print was one of the largest privately owned print companies in Canada, and growth continued in the 1990s and early 2000s. In addition to printing, the company expanded into photography, content creation, publishing, and media. In 2022, SJC acquired Assembly, one of Canada's fastest growing startups, to expand their footprint into technology and performance marketing.

== Operations ==
It is one of Canada's largest privately owned communications and media companies. The company currently has three divisions:

- The print business – SJC Print
- The full production agency – SJC Content
- The media business, a portfolio of Canada's most successful brands – SJC Media.

Tony Gagliano is Chairman and CEO of SJC. Other executives at the company include John Gagliano, President of SJC Print and Vice-Chairman; Kin-Man Lee, CFO. The corporation has 1,300 employees.

== Media ==
SJC's Media division was established in 2001 with the acquisition of Multi-Vision Publishing, and expanded further the following year with the acquisition of Key Media.

Its original brands include Fashion Magazine, and Toronto Life, as well as Mariage Québec, Ottawa Magazine, and Wedding Bells.

The company also previously published Saturday Night, Elm Street, Books for Everybody, The Look, and Shift. In March 2011, St. Joseph Media acquired the Toronto blog Torontoist.com, which it resold to Daily Hive in 2019.

On March 20, 2019 SJC Media agreed to acquire Rogers Media's Publishing assets from Rogers Communications. Once the deal was finalized, SJC took ownership of Maclean's, Chatelaine (English), Châtelaine (French), Today's Parent, Hello! Canada, Canadian Business, and Flare.

=== Media brands ===
- L'actualité médicale
- L'actualité pharmaceutique
- Canadian Business
- Châtelaine
- Chatelaine
- The Directory of Restaurant & Fast Food Chains
- The Directory of Retail Chains
- Emballages, Les Nouvelles
- Enfants Quebec
- Flare
- Gestion Santé
- glow
- glow health
- Hello! Canada
- LOU LOU (English)
- LOU LOU (French)
- Maclean's
- Mère Nouvelle
- Mon Enfant
- MoneySense
- The National List of Advertisers
- Profit
- Pure
- Québec Pharmacie
- Quill & Quire
- Shopping Centre News
- Today's Parent

== Awards ==
St. Joseph Communications has been recognized as Canada's 50 best-managed companies, and has won multiple awards for its publishing titles and content creation work. In 2017, the company has won two awards at the first Canadian Magazine Awards, three Vertex Awards for the St. Joseph's packaging work for Metro, and ten PAC Awards.
