= ¡Hola! =

Spanish celebrity magazine

- Front page featuring Ricky Martin on 17 December 2008
- Editor: Eduardo Sánchez Pérez
- Categories: Celebrity
- Frequency: Weekly
- Circulation: 209,428 (weekly)
- Founder: Antonio Sánchez Gómez
- First issue: 2 September 1944; 82 years ago
- Company: Grupo Hola
- Country: Spain
- Based in: Madrid
- Language: Spanish
- Website: hola.com
- ISSN: 0214-3895

¡Hola! (stylised in all caps), is a Spanish weekly celebrity magazine that covers celebrity news, royalty, society, fashion, beauty, and lifestyle. An asset of Grupo Hola, it began publication in 1944 from Barcelona, however, it is now published from Madrid. Eduardo Sánchez Pérez serves as the editor.

As of 2026, there are 12 international editions of the magazine. Operating as Hello! in the United Kingdom, Canada, Greece, India, Serbia, Thailand, Turkey, and as ¡Hola! in Argentina, Mexico, Colombia, the Dominican Republic, and the United States.

== Background ==
¡Hola! is a Spanish celebrity magazine that began publication on 2 September 1944, founded by Antonio Sánchez Gómez. First published in Barcelona, the headquarters have since moved to Madrid.

=== Circulation ===
The combined readership of Grupo ¡Hola! magazines is more than a million a week. In 1944, the first week saw 4,000 copies sold. In 1993, the circulation of the magazine was of 654,836 copies a week, making it the second best-selling magazine in Spain. In 1997, it was the third best selling magazine in the country with a circulation of 627,514 copies a week.

In 2005, the circulation was of 553,042 copies a week, 537,270 in 2008, and 475,049 copies in 2009.

=== Editors ===
Editor	Start year	End year
Antonio Sánchez Gómez	1944	1984
Eduardo Sánchez Junco	1984	2010
Eduardo Sánchez Pérez	2010	present

== History ==
¡Hola! was founded in Barcelona on 2 September 1944 by Antonio Sánchez Gómez, who continued to run the magazine until his death in the 1970s. He employed mainly relatives and to this day ¡Hola! remains a predominantly family run organisation, with Sánchez's wife still stepping in to provide layout for important royal wedding spreads. Later the headquarters of the magazine moved to Madrid.

Initially designed as a family magazine, Sánchez soon realized the potential for profit in the women's industry and initially focused on the doings of royalty, as well as offering a self-help section. Then the magazine became a gossip magazine, although the Spanish version still relies heavily on royalty for their gossip, whilst the English and Latin American versions focus more on Hollywood. The former Spanish Prime Minister Felipe González gave his first interview to the magazine when he was in office.

The magazine continues to grow and its edition in Argentina was launched in 2010.

== Editions ==
=== Operating ===
as ¡Hola!

- ¡Hola! Argentina (operating)
- ¡Hola! Colombia (operating)
- ¡Hola! México (operating)
- ¡Hola! Républica Dominicana (operating)
- ¡Hola! USA (operating)
- Hola! Brasil (defunct)
- ¡Hola! Chile (defunct)
- ¡Hola! Costa Rica (defunct)
- ¡Hola! Honduras (defunct)
- ¡Hola! Panama (defunct)
- ¡Hola! Peru (defunct)
- Hola! Philippines (defunct)
- ¡Hola! Puerto Rico (defunct)
- ¡Hola! Venezuela (defunct)

as Hello!

- Hello! UK (operating)
- Hello! Canada (operating)
- Hello! Greece (operating)
- Hello! India (operating)
- Hello! Srbija (operating)
- Hello! Thailand (operating)
- Hello! Türkiye (operating)
- Hello! Georgia (defunct)
- Hello! Indonesia (defunct)
- Hello! Pakistan (defunct)
- Hello! Russia (defunct)

== See also ==
- List of magazines in Spain
