= Profit (magazine) =

Canadian business magazine

- Categories: Business magazine
- Frequency: Bi-monthly
- Total circulation: 88,982 (December 2011)
- Founded: 1982; 44 years ago
- Company: Rogers Media
- Country: Canada
- Based in: Toronto
- Language: English
- Website: profitmag.org
- ISSN: 1183-1324

Profit, launched in 1982, was a bimonthly Canadian business magazine aimed at entrepreneurs. The headquarters of the magazine was in Toronto, Canada.

== History and profile ==
Profit was launched in 1982. The magazine was published bi-monthly until January 1999 when its frequency was switched to eight times a year. It then published six times per year and, according to its website, it focused on "how to find opportunity and seize it", management practices, case studies and "access to peer groups". The headquarters of the magazine was in Toronto.

Its sister magazines were Canadian Business and MoneySense. In December 2013 Profit merged with Canadian Business, appearing initially as a special section of that magazine.
