= Benoît Rolland =

- Born: 12 September 1954 (age 72); Paris
- Instrument: violin

Benoît Marie Rolland (born 12 September 1954 Paris), is a bow maker and musician, currently established in Boston, Massachusetts. An internationally renowned bow maker, he is a 2012 MacArthur Fellow and a Chevalier des Arts et des Lettres (2017).

== Biography ==
=== Early years ===
Rolland was born into a Parisian family of old descent. He received his early musical training at the age of four from his grandmother Germaine Thyssens-Valentin, a renowned concert pianist. During his childhood he frequented her musical salon, where composers such as Olivier Messiaen and other performers gathered. He began to play the violin at age eight and subsequently entered the Versailles conservatory and the Conservatoire de Paris, graduating at age 16. Among his professors were Alfred Loewenguth and Line Talluel. Aside from violin performance, his perfect pitch led to advancement in his ability to read and write music. He honed his skill for musical composition at the Schola Cantorum de Paris (1980–82) under Pierre Doury. In 1971, foregoing a promising career as a young soloist, he joined the historical bowmaking school of Mirecourt as a student of Bernard Ouchard. During these four years of intense training he developed the skills that were to make him become the youngest ever Meilleur Ouvrier de France "Best Artisan of France", at the age of 25.

=== First studio ===
Rolland established his first studio in Paris, 34 rue de Laborde, in 1976. In 1979, he was awarded the distinction of "Best Artisan of France." In 1983, he subsequently received the rare national title of Maitre Archetier d'Art. International awards followed. With the support of Étienne Vatelot, Rolland spearheaded the refinement of French Traditional Bowmaking. This merging of modernity and tradition elevated his craft to higher recognition, and he was soon commissioned to make bows for Lord Yehudi Menuhin, Arthur Grumiaux, Christian Ferras, Maurice Gendron, Joseph Suk, Leonid Kogan, Henryk Szeryng, Stéphane Grappelli, and other leading musicians. At the time, his bows were already played by concertmasters and musicians in major orchestras throughout Europe, Asia, and the United States.

=== Retreat and new directions ===
Rolland retreated to the Island of Bréhat in 1982. While there he researched new forms of bows and alternative materials, envisioning new advances in his art, as well as environmental awareness. This novel research on alternative materials for bows derived from his compound knowledge of music, bows and naval carbon/Kevlar technology.

During this prominent stage of Rolland's career, a close dialogue with soloists was developing that would nourish his research on the sound qualities of bows in future years. Rolland then imposed his style, which expressed a profound knowledge of music as well as his understanding of the intrinsic qualities that gave fine French bows their world renown.

While he continued creating traditional pernambuco bows, acquiring new clients such as Mstislav Rostropovich and Ivry Gitlis, Rolland broadened his reputation in Japan, where his creations were particularly sought. Since the beginning of his career, Rolland has been devoted to continuing the tradition, yet also committed to opening new avenues for it. Aware that his crafts rested on an endangered wood species, Pernambuco, thus far irreplaceable, between 1981 and 1986 he conceived the later trademarked Spiccato carbon fiber bow.

=== Innovation and entrepreneurship ===
Self-taught in science and new technologies, Rolland rationally combined his artistic knowledge and refined intuition. A visionary, he formulated and designed the first synthetic bow of concert quality, a bow still played today on stage by soloists.

Rolland moved back to the mainland with his completed prototypes in order to launch the Spiccato bows carbon fiber manufacture in Vannes, Brittany. His revolutionary concept of an inner tension mechanism allows the musician to modify the camber of the bow at will and change its playing qualities even on stage. This was noted as one of the main innovative steps in the history of bow making.

Within a few years, with the support of noted soloists (Yehudi Menuhin, Jaime Laredo, Ivry Gitlis, J.-P. Wallez, Heinrich Schiff, Christian Tetzlaff) his company attained international acclaim. In 1994, the bow that Jean-Luc Ponty called "the 21st century bow" was awarded Musicora First International Prize. This contributed to a new dynamic of innovation in musical instrument and bow making far beyond the work of Rolland himself: in less than ten years, hundreds of manufactures of carbon bows were appearing around the world.

In 2012 Rolland introduced a significant innovation in the design of the bow with the Galliane frog. Galliane frogs give a slight helicoidal shape to the bow hair, allowing the performer to play with a fuller hair ribbon from frog to tip.

In 2016 Rolland evolved the orchestra conducting baton, creating a new shape that transformed the conventional bulb of the baton. The ergonomic design, based on a 3-D imprint of the conductor hand, combines physiology and musical purpose.

=== Bow as artwork ===
In 1999–2000 Rolland stepped back from active entrepreneurship in order to create a curriculum for the first bow making school in the United States. Following these intense years, he permanently settled in the United States in 2003, where he made his home and studio, in Boston, Massachusetts.

Rolland now concentrates on making wood bows as individual art pieces, and has been commissioned by artists such as Anne-Sophie Mutter, Yo Yo Ma, Miriam Fried, Christian Tetzlaff, Lynn Harrell, Kim Kashkashian, and Julia Fischer. This new phase of his career reflects an understanding of the bow making process as unifying fine artisanship and musical knowledge. It was noted as a Contemporary Art form by the Isabella Stewart Gardner Museum, Boston and presented in 2005 in a program of its Contemporary Art Department.

Rolland invests much time in historical and scientific research, writes about bow making and gives public lectures. His bows were featured in an exhibition, The Violin in America: Old World Tradition, New World Sound, at the Museum of Making Music, Carlsbad, California, in 2008.

== Reputation ==
Rolland, whom Ron Fletcher (The Boston Globe, 2005) called "one of the world's greatest bow makers" and "The Lord of the Strings", has created with his hands about 1,500 wood bows in the first 35 years of his career. These bows are played today around the world as Rolland continues his work.

Most of the major soloists of the past three decades, at some point in their career, have acquired a bow, sometimes several, made by Rolland. In his 2018 recording of the J. S. Bach Suites for Cello, Yo Yo Ma used a Rolland bow, in his words a "magic bow".

Rolland bows, that Menuhin once deemed "A gift for the violinists", are featured in private collections in Europe, the US and Japan.

Rolland participates in foundational programs helping young musicians (Zino Francescatti competition, the Peabody Institute, Anne-Sophie Mutter Foundation). In 2016 he donated bow #1515 to Community Music Works, a nonprofit that brings string music to young people in disadvantaged communities. Rolland is a long-time contributor to "Music for Food", a Boston initiative to fight hunger in our communities.

He is called on as a judge for international bow making competitions, gives lectures in music schools (Curtis Institute, Longy School of Music, etc.) and he contributes to the magazine The Strad.

Rolland has trained about 20 apprentices so far, and conceived the curriculum for the first bowmaking school in America.

Benoît Rolland is a registered trademark.

== Awards and recognitions ==
- Chevalier des Arts et des Lettres 2017
- MacArthur Fellow 2012-2017 (John D. and Catherine T. MacArthur Foundation)
- First Prize Patrimonialis, 1996 (Foundation for French Patrimony)
- First International Prize Musicora, 1994
- Award ANVAR, 1991 (National Agency for Research)
- Master of Art in Bow Making, 1983 (Maitre Archetier d'Art)
- Gold medal Best Artisan of France, 1979 (Un des Meilleurs Ouvriers de France)
