= Investigation Discovery (disambiguation) =

Investigation Discovery is a television channel in the United States.

Investigation Discovery may also refer to:

- Investigation Discovery (Canadian TV channel)
- Investigation Discovery (European TV channel)
- Investigation Discovery (Indian TV channel)
- Investigation Discovery (Latin American TV channel)
- Investigation Discovery (Swedish TV channel)
