= Lou Lou =

Canadian women's magazine

LOU LOU
- Categories: women's magazine
- Frequency: 8 per year
- Total circulation: 146,001 (English); 73,883 (French) (December 2011)
- Founded: 2004; 22 years ago
- Final issue: 2016
- Company: Rogers Media
- Country: Canada
- Based in: Toronto
- Language: English, French
- Website: www.louloumagazine.com
- ISSN: 1710-2987

LOU LOU was a Canadian women's magazine launched in 2004. The magazine was headquartered in Toronto. It was printed by Rogers Media on a monthly basis, in English and French editions. The magazine closed in 2016.
