= Tony Gagliano =

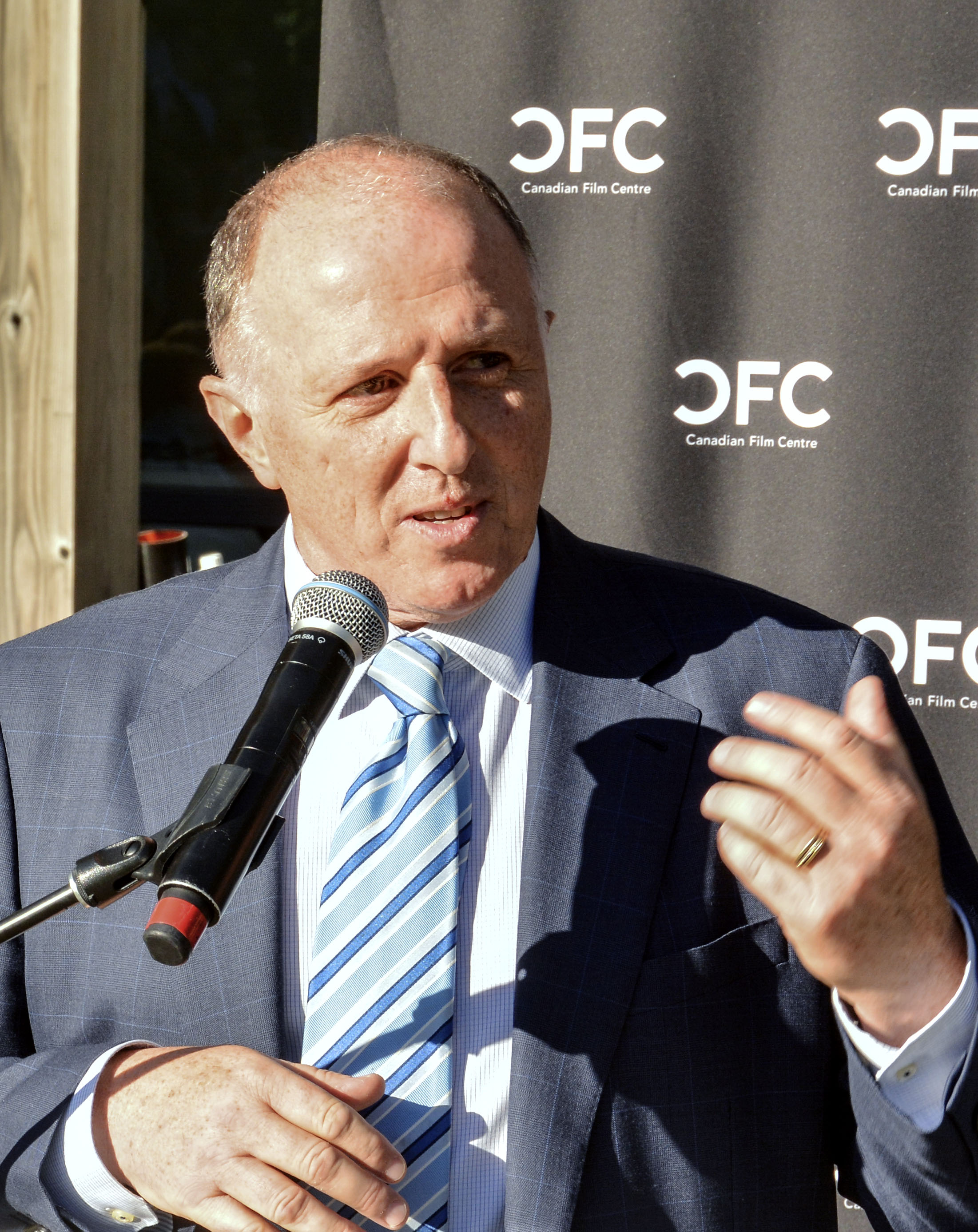
- Gagliano in 2017
- Born: June 13, 1958 (age 67); Toronto, Ontario, Canada
- Children: 3
- Parent(s): Gaetano Gagliano; Giuseppina Gagliano

Tony Gagliano LL.D. (Italian: [gaʎˈʎaːno]; born June 13, 1958) is a Canadian businessman, entrepreneur and philanthropist. He is the executive chairman and CEO of St. Joseph Communications, Canada's largest private communications company. St. Joseph is the publisher of many of Canada's magazines including Maclean's, Toronto Life and Fashion. Gagliano is President of the Art Gallery of Ontario and is co-founder and chair of Toronto's Festival of Creativity & Arts, Luminato. In 2009 he was appointed onto the board of the 2015 Toronto Pan American Games.

== Background ==
Tony Gagliano was born to Italian immigrants Gaetano Gagliano and Giussepina Gagliano in 1958 in Toronto, Ontario. He was their seventh child, He has four brothers and five sisters. Gaetano started a small print shop in his basement and encouraged his children to come work for him to help grow the business. Gagliano has a Bachelor of Business Management from Ryerson Polytechnical Institute (1980).

He is married with three children and currently resides in Toronto.

== Business ==
In 1979, he began his rise in the print industry with his first of many positions with St. Joseph Communications. He became general manager in 1987 and, shortly thereafter, at 29 years of age, was named president. After several years with the organization, he became chief executive officer in 1995. As of 2019, he served as executive chairman and chief executive officer of St. Joseph Communications.

== Arts ==
After serving on the board of the Art Gallery of Ontario for several years, in 2009 Gagliano was appointed president of the board as the successor to Charles Baillie.

Gagliano also led a huge initiative for the AGO which was called Galleria Italia. This was a $13 million plan to create a space at the Art Gallery during its renovation by Canadian born architect Frank Gehry. The special aspect of this was that it was a gift from all Italian families to the city of Toronto and to Canada, which some have seen as highly welcoming to the Italians.

In 2009, along with the support and funding of the Canadian Federal Government, Gagliano and Pecaut announced the "Canadian Prize". A new Canada Prize for the Arts and Creativity could be in place by 2010, with large cash prizes for emerging artists in dance, music, theatre and visual arts. The federal budget allocated $25 million toward an endowment to support the awards, which would be open to artists around the world. It has never materialized.

== Luminato ==
Gagliano is co-founder and chair of Luminato, Toronto's Annual Festival of Arts & Creativity which opened in 2007. For the years leading up to its first festival year, Gagliano and David Pecaut thought of the idea to create what would be an arts and creativity festival. Events included performances from The Guess Who's Randy Bachman, K'naan, Rufus Wainwright, Bruce Cockburn, John Malkovich, art installations, theater productions, and operas. Millions of people attended the festival in its first four years.

== Honours ==
Tony Gagliano is the former president of the Art Gallery of Ontario.

On June 18, 2010, he received an honorary Doctor of Laws degree from Ryerson.

Gagliano is a member of the Young Presidents' Organization as well as a board member of the St. Michael's Hospital Board and the St. Michael's Hospital Foundation Board. In addition, he is a cabinet member of Toronto Metropolitan University as Ryerson is known today and an honorary board member of Scouts Canada.

His personal contributions center on education and the environment, supporting "Partners in Growth" with Scouts Canada, which since its inception has planted over 1,750,000 trees across Canada. St. Joseph was also the first Corporation in Canada to receive the Financial Post award for environmental excellence.

Tony played a role in initiating the St. Joseph Foundation, which today provides consistent long-term direction to the charitable activities of St. Joseph Communications and allocates funds to the relief of poverty and the advancement of education. In October 2003, Tony Gagliano received the Ernst and Young Entrepreneur of the Year Award for "Business to Business, Products and Services" for the Province of Ontario.

In 2008, Gagliano was recognized by the Jewish-Toronto community as the recipient of the Words and Deeds Leadership Award. Tony Gagliano was also awarded with Canadian of the year along with David Pecaut in 2008 by the Canadian Club for his efforts on Luminato.

He was named one of Canada's Top 40 under 40 in 1995, Ernst and Young’s Ontario Entrepreneur of the Year for “Business to Business, Products and Services” in 2003, and he received an Alumni Achievement Award from Ryerson University in 2007.

In 2011, Gagliano was named Canadian Printer of the Year and was the co-chair of the Venetian Ball in Toronto for Villa Colombo.
