= Galiano (surname) =

Galiano is a surname. Notable people with the surname include:

- Dionisio Alcalá Galiano (1760–1805), Spanish naval officer, cartographer and explorer
- María Elena Galiano (1928–2000), Argentine arachnologist
- Mateus Galiano da Costa (born 1984), Angolan footballer
- Phil Galiano (born 1977), American football coach
