= Galliane =

A Galliane is a bow frog for stringed instrument bows that sets the hair ribbon at an angle. This kind of frog was first described in Scientific American in October 2012. It was invented by bow maker Benoît Rolland for violin, viola, cello, and double bass bows.

== The frog ==
The frog is the part at the end of the bow that encloses the mechanism responsible for tightening and holding the bow hair ribbon. The name ‘frog’ may derive from the use of the frock, the small device that bow makers use to shape it. It is also referred to as the heel of the bow.

== The evolution of the bow ==
The classical bow was pioneered by François Xavier Tourte, a French master bowmaker from the late 18th and early 19th century. With the help of virtuoso violinist G.B. Viotti he sought to improve upon the limitations of the Baroque bow by lengthening it, strengthening its tip, and introducing a curvature that allowed for greater flexibility and improved the springing action of the bow. Tourte’s craftsmanship led to the development of the modern bow, with a design that has remained fundamentally unchanged.

With Tourte’s design the bow hair is set parallel to the longitudinal axis of the bow stick, requiring players to adapt the natural movement of their arm to the constraint of the shape. Benoît Rolland introduced a significant innovation in the history of bow making with a new frog design in which the underside is angled. This frog was named "Galliane", and is a trademark with patent. Throughout history, bow makers have crafted frogs that were visually appealing. Galliane follows this tradition by presenting a different original outline. One of these designs includes a geometrical ferrule for the first time in history. While Galliane has been noted for its design, the technical elements outweigh the aesthetics.

== Technical elements ==
According to The Strad, with Galliane the hair ribbon has more contact with the strings, producing increased traction. These frogs give a slight helicoidal twist to the bow hair; this allows the performer to play with a fuller hair ribbon from frog to tip.“To achieve this, the frog (the usually ebony, block-shaped part of the bow, where it is held) is offset by 15 degrees.”

== Musical functionality ==
Galliane facilitates stability and ease, allowing more natural bowing on the part of the player. This allows the player’s hand to relax, preserving ligaments and joints, thus helping to prevent performance-related injuries.

Since its introduction, many renowned string players have played with the Galliane Frog, including Anne-Sophie Mutter, Kim Kashkashian, Miriam Fried, Julian Rachlin, Lynn Harrell, Aleksey Igudesman, Malcom Lowe, and Jean-Luc Ponty.

== See also ==
- Bow Frog
- Bow (music)
