= Gagliano Aterno =

- Comune
- Comune di Gagliano Aterno
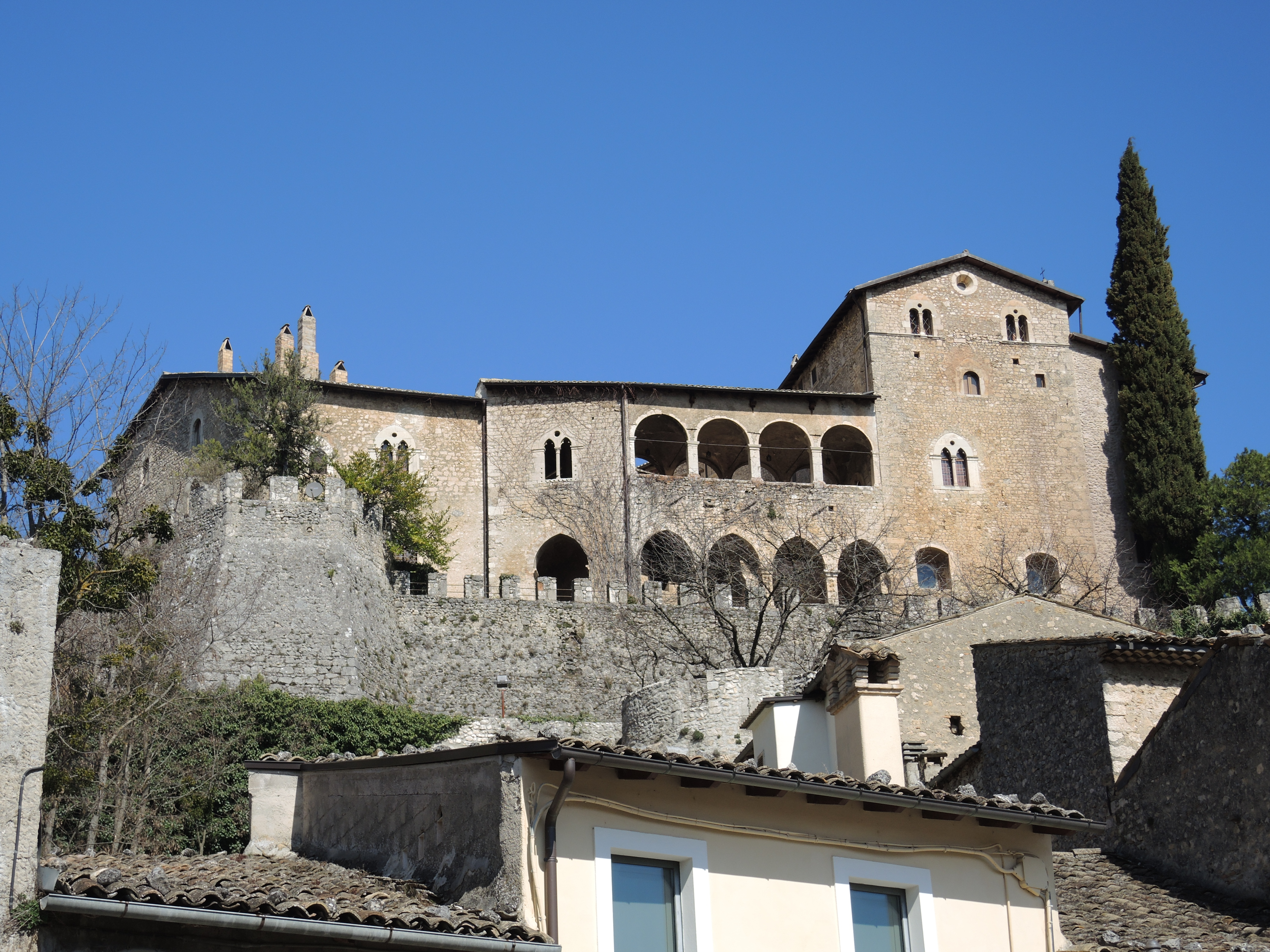

- Location within Italy Location within Abruzzo
- Coordinates: 42°7′39″N 13°42′3″E
- Country: Italy
- Region: Abruzzo
- Province: L'Aquila (AQ)

Area
  - Total: 33.30 km^{2} (12.86 sq mi)
- Elevation: 650 m (2,130 ft)

Population (31 December 2013)
  - Total: 253
  - Density: 7.60/km^{2} (19.7/sq mi)
- Demonym: Gaglianesi
- Time zone: UTC+1 (CET)
  - Summer (DST): UTC+2 (CEST)
- Postal code: 67020
- Dialing code: 0864
- Patron saint: San Martino
- Saint day: 11 November

Gagliano Aterno is a town and comune approximately 45 kilometres (28 mi) from Aquila in the Abruzzo region of Italy. It is located in the vicinity of an ancient pre-Roman settlement, although most of the buildings in the village are from the medieval period.

== Sights ==
- Castello di Gagliano Aterno, constructed in the 14th century.
- Church of Saint Martin
- Church of Santa Chiara, which has noteworthy stucco decorations from the Baroque period.
