= Juan Benítez (footballer, born 1953) =

Paraguayan footballer

Personal information
- Full name: Juan Benítez Galeano
- Date of birth: 3 June 1953 (age 73)
- Place of birth: Itacurubí del Rosario, Paraguay
- Position: Defender

Senior career*
Years	Team	Apps	(Gls)
1972–1973	Fernando de la Mora		
1974–1975	Sol de América		
1976–1977	Atlético Tembetary		
1977	Elche		
1978–1982	Guaraní		
1981	→ Atlético Colegiales (loan)		
1983–1985	San Lorenzo		
1984	→ C.D. Antofagasta (loan)		
1985	Guaraní		
1986	Presidente Hayes		
1987	General Caballero		
1987	Esmeraldas Petrolero		
1988	Rubio Ñu		
1989	Deportivo Recoleta		
1990	Oriental		
1991	General Caballero		
1992	Deportivo Humaitá		
1993	Silvio Pettirossi		
- * Club domestic league appearances and goals

Juan Benítez Galeano (born 23 June 1953 in Itacurubí) is a Paraguayan former footballer who played as a defender for clubs from Paraguay, Chile, Ecuador and Spain.

== Honours ==
Atlético Tembetary

- Second Division Championship: 1976

San Lorenzo

- Second Division Championship: 1984
