= Andrea Galliani =

Italian volleyball player (born 1988)

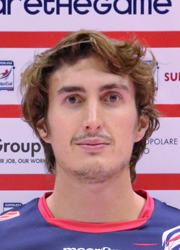

Personal information
- Nationality: Italian
- Born: 6 January 1988 (age 38)
- Height: 204 cm (6 ft 8 in)
- Weight: 93 kg (205 lb)
- Spike: 360 cm (142 in)
- Block: 335 cm (132 in)

Volleyball information
- Number: 21 (national team)

Career
Years	Teams
2015	Vero Volley

National team
2015	Italy

Andrea Galliani (born 6 January 1988) is an Italian male volleyball player. He is part of the Italy men's national volleyball team. On club level he plays for Vero Volley.
