= Gagliano Neto =

Leonardo Gagliano Neto was a Brazilian radio announcer and sports commentator. In 1938 he made history in Brazilian communications, at that year's Football World Cup in France as Brazil's Radio Club sports commentator. Through radio sets as well as loudspeakers installed in parks and public thoroughfares throughout the country, he thrilled the Brazilian population with their first nationwide transatlantic live radio broadcast.

- http://terceirotempo.bol.uol.com.br/que-fim-levou/gagliano-neto-4179
- http://guiadoscuriosos.com.br/blog/2014/02/11/a-historia-de-gagliano-neto-o-primeiro-speaker-brasileiro-em-copas-do-mundo/
