= Chatelaine (magazine) =

Canadian English-language magazine

- Editor: Maureen Halushak (January 2019 - August 5, 2026)
- Former editors: Anne Elizabeth Wilson, Byrne Hope Sanders, John Clare, Doris Anderson, Mildred Istona, Rona Maynard, Jane Francisco, Lianne George
- Categories: Women's magazine
- Frequency: 6 times a year
- Total circulation: 257,000 according to AAM June 2017 (June 2017)
- Founded: March, 1928
- First issue: March 1928
- Company: St. Joseph Communications
- Country: Canada
- Based in: Toronto
- Language: English
- Website: www.chatelaine.com
- ISSN: 0009-1995

Chatelaine is an English-language Canadian women's magazine which covers topics from food, style and home décor to politics, health and relationships. Chatelaine and its French-language version, Châtelaine, are published by St. Joseph Communications (SJC).

Chatelaine was first published in March 1928 by Maclean Publishing. From 1957 to 1977, Chatelaine's editor was Doris Anderson, under whose tenure the magazine covered women's issues, including the rise of feminism as a social phenomenon. Other recent editors include Mildred Istona, Rona Maynard and Lianne George. As of October 2026, the most recent editor-in-chief of Chatelaine was Maureen Halushak, who stepped down from her role in early August. The magazine's parent company, SJC, announced in July 2026 that it was searching for her replacement.

In 2014, Chatelaine ranked first in Canada as the largest magazine with a total circulation of 534,294 copies. By June 2017, however, Chatelaine ranked fourth among Canadian magazines, with a circulation of 257,000 copies. Due to falling print ad revenues and a declining circulation, Chatelaine reduced its publication frequency from 12 to 6 times a year in 2017. Other Rogers Media publications, which held an interest in Chatelaine at the time, also reduced their publication frequency or became digital-only publications.

== Founding ==
First published in March 1928, Chatelaine was created by the Maclean Hunter Publishing Company as a means to reach a different demographic than its other publications, Maclean's and the Financial Post. Maclean Hunter Publishing Company solicited ideas from Canadian women to choose a name for the magazine, offering a $1000 prize for the winning entry. The contest drew 75,000 entries. A rancher's wife from Eburne, British Columbia won with her suggestion of "The Chatelaine." The title refers to the ring of keys which housewives long ago would use to get into every part of the house. The cover of the first Chatelaine issue reflected the publisher's intended audience of affluent and middle-class Canadian women, featuring an illustration of an elegantly dressed mother reading to her two daughters. Anne Elizabeth Wilson was appointed as the first editor of the magazine as well and would ultimately quit in 1929 when she married her fiancee, Victor Paulovich Blochin.

== 1920s and 1930s ==
The first issue of Chatelaine was published the same month that Emily Murphy presented the Persons Case to the Supreme Court, a major turning point in Canadian women's history. In December 1929, Murphy wrote an article for Chatelaine titled "Now That Women Are Persons, What's Ahead?" Along with providing advice on style, cooking, homemaking, and child-rearing, Chatelaine published editorials from influential female thinkers. In 1928 and 1929, article topics included panic over the rising divorce rate, "Wages and Wives" (April 1929), and the high maternal mortality rate in rural Canada (July 1928).

The economic hardships of the Great Depression changed the tone of Chatelaine. During the 1930s, the magazine became less political. Popular parts of the magazine included monthly budget meal plans and fictional stories. Like those published in other Canadian magazines of the period, these stories often focused on romantic relationships and family life. Beyond entertainment, such fiction could reinforce traditional expectations about women's roles by presenting a comfortable home and family stability as important sources of happiness. Moreover, Canadian women contributed to the magazine as writers. Madge Macbeth, for instance, published short stories in Chatelaine and used her writing to support herself and her two sons after being widowed. Her experience reveals how writing provided women with opportunities to earn an income and support their families at a time when marriage and motherhood were often emphasized as women's primary responsibilities.

There was also a rise in male-authored articles, including "Men Don't Want Clever Wives," and "What Did Your Husband Give Up For Marriage?" (August 1938). The magazine encouraged participation from readers, offering a prize of $25 to the best letter written in response to one of their articles. In October 1938, Edith Hunter of Calgary won the $25 for her letter in response to "What Did Your Husband Give Up For Marriage?" contesting the article. Chatelaine tried to maintain its position as a voice for Canadian women, and included a few political articles with a feminist edge such as "When Women Enter Public Life?" (September 1938), and "Why I Had a Civil Marriage" (March 1935).

== World War II ==
The editor of the magazine from 1929 to 1952 was Byrne Hope Sanders. Sanders took some time off from the magazine during World War II after being seconded to Ottawa. She was made a Companion of the Order of Canada for her work as head of the Wartime Prices and Trade Board, where she implemented food rationing and set up a consumer council of women.

During the Second World War, Chatelaine published cover images of young women in uniform, working on farms, and contributing to the war effort. After the war, as husbands returned home from overseas, the magazine immediately switched to images of ultra-femininity and articles on being a wife. There was a sharp increase in articles about motherhood and family life. Editorials such as "Don't Delay Parenthood" (May 1946) were suitable companions to the "Baby Boom" period.

== Postwar Years (1945–1957) ==
Despite women taking on greater responsibilities during the Second World War, Chatelaine increasingly presented marriage, motherhood, and homemaking as central to women's lives in the years that followed. Even articles in Chatelaine that questioned domestic expectations for women appeared alongside numerous advertisements and advice columns promoting an idealized image of the happy housewife. At the same time, the magazine provided a forum for Canadian women to respond to views they disagreed with through letters to the editor.

In March 1950, the magazine published a provocative article by journalist Beverley Grey titled "Housewives Are a Sorry Lot," which accused married women of giving up intellectual interests and becoming complacent about domestic life. The article drew strong reactions from readers, with more than 500 housewives writing to criticize its portrayal of married women as lazy, unintelligent, and unhappy in marriage. In response, Chatelaine published a follow-up article in June 1950 drawing on letters from women defending their family responsibilities, intellectual interests, and involvement in community affairs and politics.

Recipes were another way the magazine communicated expectations surrounding women's domestic responsibilities. Its annual "50 Favorite Family Recipes" feature began in 1951 and became a contest open to readers across Canada in 1954. Entries included affordable family dishes, such as casseroles using canned ingredients, reflecting both the popularity of convenient processed foods and expectations that housewives prepare nutritious meals efficiently. By submitting family recipes, women further shared practical knowledge and contributed to the magazine's portrayal of Canadian food culture.

Additionally, Chatelaine magazine addressed sensitive topics through a series of eight articles by Toronto physician Dr. Marion Hilliard, published between 1954 and 1956. Hilliard discussed women's health and sexuality openly in these articles, covering subjects such as menstruation, menopause, childbirth, and fatigue that were rarely discussed so directly in mainstream publications. Some readers welcomed this information, describing her advice as helping women better understand their bodies. Similarly, Hilliard encouraged women to pursue education, meaningful work, and interests beyond the home. Although Hilliard encouraged this greater independence, her advice still reflected traditional expectations of women, emphasizing wives' responsibilities for maintaining happy marriages and presenting women's sexuality primarily within the context of heterosexual marriage. Her advice therefore both challenged and reinforced traditional ideas about women's roles.

== 1957–1977 ==
After five years under editor John Clare (editor 1952–1957), feminist Doris Anderson took over the position in 1957 and held the position until 1977. Under Anderson, Chatelaine began publishing controversial content about subjects including sex and women's rights.

Her early tenure at the magazine saw it transformed from a traditional women's publication into one that addressed challenging issues, including legal abortion in specific circumstances (1959), an exposé on child abuse (1960), a critique of Canadian divorce laws (1961) and a call for equal pay for women (1962). The writers she employed included June Callwood, Barbara Frum, Adrienne Clarkson, and Michele Landsberg.

While Chatelaine increasingly addressed women's rights and social issues, its emphasis on ideal homemaking continued into the 1960s. Its "Mrs. Chatelaine" contest highlighted married women judged on qualities such as household management, family responsibilities, and community activities. As a result, the contest produced criticism. In 1961, reader Beatrice Maitland mocked the standards promoted by the competition through the figure of "Mrs. Slob," prompting other women to question whether the contest represented their own lives. Some criticism even concerned class differences. Readers argued that the winning homemakers appeared better off than many ordinary Canadian families and that the contest's standards required money and free time not available to everyone. Their responses challenged the assumption that a single model of domestic life could represent the experiences of all Canadian women.

The magazine's coverage of lesbian women developed more cautiously during this period as well. In 1966, Chatelaine published Renate Wilson's "What Turns Women to Lesbianism?", which introduced readers to lesbian women's experiences but largely presented them as people deserving sympathy rather than challenging prevailing discrimination. A 1977 article, "Gay Women: A Minority Report," addressed prejudice and the desire for equal treatment more directly, although its discussion still emphasized women whose lives appeared similar to those of heterosexual readers.

Another significant change was Chatelaine's increasing attention to women's health. A study of the magazine's health articles from 1928 to 2010 found comparatively little discussion of reproductive health before 1960, followed by a substantial expansion of coverage during the following decades. This change included greater attention to women's sexuality, reproductive decisions, and health information.

Furthermore, an example of Doris Anderson's editorial approach to women's issues at Chatelaine can be seen in 1963, when she considered publishing an excerpt of Betty Friedan's The Feminine Mystique. Anderson turned down the excerpt, claiming that the magazine had already covered the material Friedan wrote about. This anecdote is often used to distinguish Anderson and her publication as ahead of its time. Anderson later said that she regretted missing out on what she called "the scoop of the century."

Anderson pursued and was passed over for the position of editor in chief of Maclean's magazine three times in just over two years: first for Peter Gzowski, then for former managing editor Phil Sykes and finally for Peter C. Newman. It would not be until 2016, more than 45 years later, that a female editor would be appointed to helm Maclean's, the country's oldest active magazine (launched in 1905).

Promoting the role of women in politics under her direction, Chatelaine identified 50 women who had potential as parliamentarians and put 12 of them – including Member of Parliament Flora MacDonald who referred to it in an interview at Anderson's passing^{[4]} – on the cover. For much of her life, she supported greater representation of women in Parliament. In 1974, she was made an Officer of the Order of Canada for her contributions to publishing and to public affairs. She left the magazine in 1977.

== 1977–2004 ==
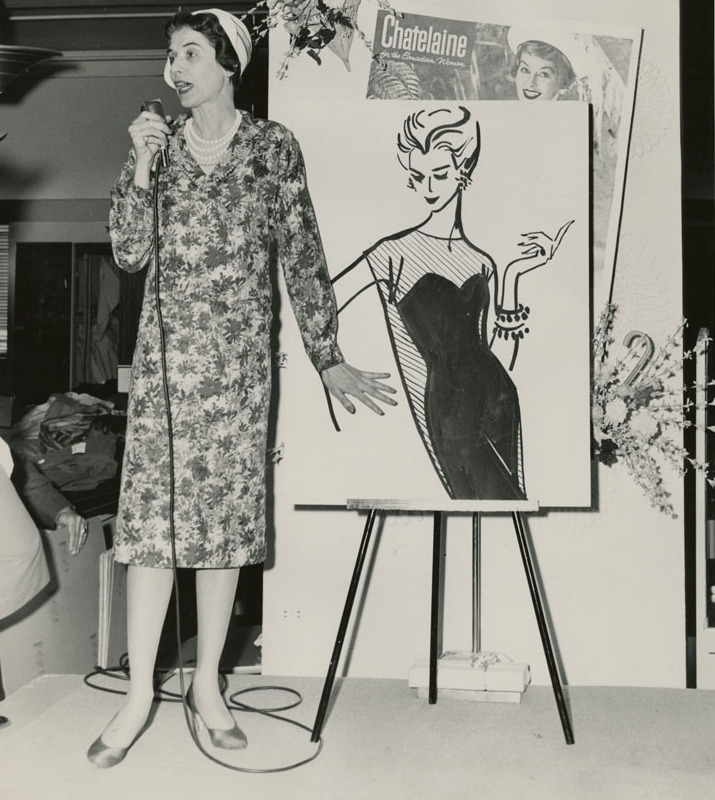
Vivian Wilcox, fashion editor for the magazine, circa 1955.

Mildred Istona was editor in chief from 1977 until 1994. Under Istona, Chatelaine placed greater emphasis on fashion and entertainment and reduced some of its earlier feminist focus.

Rona Maynard was editor in chief from 1994 until 2004. Under Maynard, the magazine became more personal, often dealing with the struggles, stories and needs of everyday women. The magazine also addressed discrimination against lesbian women, including a 1995 article about the difficulties of being open about one's sexuality at work. By the late 1990s, however, Chatelaine increasingly presented same-sex attraction in terms of sexual experimentation and fluidity, with less attention to lesbian identity and political struggles for equality.

Lee Simpson was the first female publisher of Chatelaine in 1988. Donna Clark was publisher from 1998 until 2004. Clark led a re-launch of Chatelaine that cost more than $2 million in March 1999.

== 2004–2008 ==
Kim Pittaway succeeded Maynard in 2004 as Chatelaine's editor in chief. Maynard chose Pittaway to replace her with help from publisher Donna Clark. Pittaway joined Chatelaine in 1997 as a freelance editor, and in 1999 started writing her monthly column "Broadside". In 2001, she joined the magazine full-time as managing editor. Pittaway departed the magazine after 15 months as editor in chief due to conflicts with the Publisher. Kerry Mitchell was publisher of Chatelaine at that time. Mitchell was publisher of Chatelaine and vice-president of Rogers Consumer Publishing from 2004 until 2009.

Beth Hitchcock was named interim editor of Chatelaine for 5 months in 2005–2006.

Sara Angel spent 14 months in the position of editor in chief of Chatelaine from May 2006 – July 2007. Angel looked to infuse "more opinion, more entertainment and more ideas" into Chatelaine to bring back previous editor Doris Anderson's feminist voice. The publication had 4.5 million readers at the time, according to the Print Measurement Bureau.

Maryam Sanati was named editor in chief of Chatelaine February 2008. Sanati had been deputy editor of Chatelaine for more than 18 months. Her role as editor in chief was announced on the eve of the media brand's 80th anniversary celebration. The magazine unveiled a new look with its May 2018 issue.

In 2008, the magazine would be recognized as the second-most influential magazine in Canada – just ahead of Maclean's.

== 2009–2014 ==
Ken Whyte assumed the role of publisher of Chatelaine October 2009 until 2011 when he was named President of Rogers Publishing.

Jane Francisco was named editor in chief November 2009, making her the magazine's fifth editor in less than six years. Between 2004 and 2010, Chatelaine had lost nearly 850,000 readers from total yearly readership. Under Francisco's tenure, Chatelaine celebrated its 85 anniversary in 2013 with a special June double issue with four flip covers.

Tara Tucker was named Publisher in January 2012. Chatelaine released a new logo and a new brand campaign.

In the second half of 2012, Chatelaine was No. 1 for the first time in the magazine's history in paid circulation, and single copy sales were up 8%.

In the past, the magazine has named a Woman of the Year, honouring a Canadian woman for her achievements in the previous year. Honorees have included Prime Minister Kim Campbell, athlete Chantal Petitclerc, pop singer k.d. lang, and "Jane Doe", a Toronto woman who waged a successful court battle against the Toronto Police Service after alleging that in 1986 the police force had failed to issue warnings about Paul Callow, who subsequently raped her.

In 2013, Francisco and Tucker launched several multichannel initiatives including a two-hour weekly radio program, television edition and various licensing agreements – even a highly successful fitness app which reached #1 in 18 countries in health & fitness category. Chatelaine launched the Chatelaine Show 14 August 2012 on CityLine on CityTV. The Chatelaine Edition became a regular feature on CityTV in 2013.

In July 2013, Rogers Media launched Chatelaine Radio, a two-hour weekly lifestyle radio program. The program, hosted by a local personality in each market but with common health, food and fashion features contributed by the magazine's editors, initially premiered on four Rogers Radio stations, CHFI-FM in Toronto, CHFM-FM in Calgary and CHYM-FM and CIKZ-FM in Kitchener-Waterloo.

Francisco left to run Good Housekeeping in the US in 2013. Karine Ewart was named editor in chief January 2014.

== 2015–2018 ==
Lianne George was named editor in chief in June 2015. George had been the magazine's editorial director since 2014. By 2017 circulation had fallen from the largest in Canada the fourth largest. In 2017, Rogers Media reduced the number of print editions from twelve times a year to six.

== 2019-present ==
Maureen Halushak was named editor in January 2019.

On 20 March 2019, Rogers announced a deal to sell the magazine to St. Joseph Communications.

== See also ==
- Media in Canada
- Miss Chatelaine
