= Elida Galeano =

Nicaraguan politician

Member of the Nicaraguan National Assembly
- Incumbent
- Assumed office 10 January 2007

Personal details
- Born: Elida María Galeano Cornejo; 18 February 1965 (age 61) Jinotega Department, Nicaragua
- Party: Sandinista National Liberation Front
- Occupation: Politician

Elida María Galeano Cornejo (born 18 February 1965) is a Nicaraguan politician. She was an activist of the Contra movement and a participant in the civil war against the Sandinista regime of the 1980s. She is the sister of the field commander of the Nicaraguan Democratic Force, chief of staff of the Nicaraguan Resistance, Israel Galeano. After the end of the civil war, she reconciled with the Sandinistas. Since 2007, she is a deputy of the National Assembly representing the Sandinista National Liberation Front.

== Political career ==
In the 2006 elections, which resulted in Daniel Ortega again becoming president, Galeano was elected to the National Assembly from the FSLN. She received a second mandate in the 2011 elections. She became a member of the parliamentary committees on defence, security, human rights and foreign affairs. It deals with issues of social policy, assistance to civil war veterans, public safety, transport, and labor migration.

On 13 June 2012, the National Assembly, on the initiative of Galeano, established a national holiday on 27 June, entitled the Day of Nicaraguan Resistance, Peace, Freedom, Unity and National Reconciliation. In 2015, Galeano introduced a bill on the social reintegration of resistance veterans into the armed forces and the Ministry of Internal Affairs. She also initiated the creation of the Nicaraguan Resistance Alliance Party (Partido Alianza Resistencia Nicaragüense, PARN). Commenters noted that PARN does not differ in any way from PRN other than the word "alliance" in its name. Even before the official registration of PARN, Galeano announced that the party would act in alliance with the FSLN.

In the 2016 elections, Galeano was again elected to the National Assembly as a representative of the FSLN. She is also a member of the Central American Parliament.

== Personal life ==
Galeano is married and has four children. Her cousin Lucila Galeano (known as Irma) was a paramedic and radio operator of the Contras during the war. After the war, she worked in the OAS health care system.
