= Hello! Canada =

- Cover of the June 16, 2025, issue
- Categories: Celebrity
- Frequency: Weekly
- Publisher: St. Joseph Communications
- First issue: September 24, 2006
- Company: Hello! Canada
- Country: Canada
- Based in: Toronto
- Language: English
- Website: hellomagazine.com/ca
- ISSN: 1911-3110

Hello! Canada is a Canadian entertainment magazine. Launched in 2006 by Rogers Media, the magazine was licensed as a local edition of the Spanish ¡Hola! brand of entertainment magazines. Prior to its launch, the British edition Hello! was directly distributed in Canada; although this was discontinued when the Canadian edition was launched, the Canadian edition continued to run selected content from the British version. The first issue featured a cover story on Margaret Trudeau, Justin Trudeau and Alexandre Trudeau.

Its announcement influenced Torstar to offer a promotion for its competing magazine Weekly Scoop, temporarily dropping that magazine's cover price to just 25 cents the week after Hello! Canada's launch was announced.

On March 20, 2019, Rogers announced a deal to sell the magazine to St. Joseph Communications.
