= Galliano =

Galliano may refer to:

- Galliano (liqueur), a liqueur
- Galliano (surname)
- Galliano (band), 1980s–1990s UK acid jazz/jazz funk/dance band (reformed in 2023)
- Galliano, a subdivision of Cantù, Italy
- Galliano, Louisiana, United States
- Banco Galliano, also Galliano's Bank, a bank that operated in Gibraltar from 1855 to 1987

== See also ==
- Galiano (disambiguation)
- Gagliano (disambiguation)
- Galeano (disambiguation)
