= Rogers Sports & Media =

Subsidiary of Rogers Communications

Rogers Media Inc.
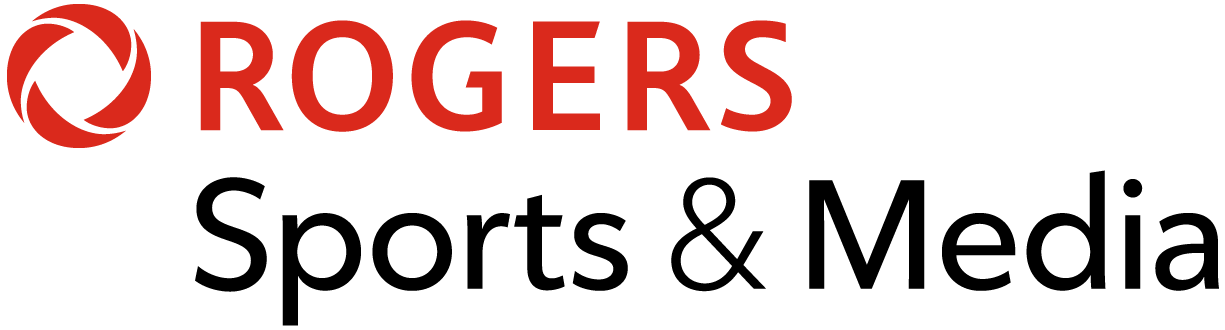
- Trade name: Rogers Sports & Media
- Type: Subsidiary
- Industry: Mass media
- Predecessor: Maclean-Hunter
- Founded: 1960; 66 years ago (original); 1994; 32 years ago (current)
- Headquarters: 1 Mount Pleasant Road, Toronto, Ontario, Canada
- Products: Entertainment, News, and Sports
- Parent: Rogers Communications
- Divisions: Rogers Radio
- Website: rogerssportsandmedia.com

Rogers Media Inc., operating as Rogers Sports & Media, is the mass media and sports media division of Canadian media conglomerate Rogers Communications.

== Operations ==
Current television brands owned by Rogers include two television systems: the English-language Citytv, and the multicultural-oriented Omni Television. Other television brands owned by Rogers include CityNews 24/7 and TSC, as well as Canadian versions of FX, FXX, Bravo, Discovery Channel, Food Network, HGTV, Investigation Discovery and Magnolia Network.

The Sportsnet family of channels, which began as a group of regional sport channels, now serves as the de facto sports programming brand and division for Rogers.

In addition to television, the Rogers Radio division owns 44 stations across Canada.

== History ==
=== Background, formation, and early expansion ===
Rogers Media was established in 1960 when Ted Rogers and Joel Aldred acquired CHFI. The origins of Rogers can be traced to 1927 when Edward S. Rogers Sr. launched a radio station that would eventually become CFRB.

In August 1925, the name Rogers came into view on the Canadian broadcasting scene with the introduction of the Rogers Batteryless Radio at the Canadian National Exhibition in Toronto. This invention was made with new tubes by Edward S. (Ted) Rogers, who invented them. Rogers Sr founded the holding company Standard Radio Manufacturing Corporation Ltd. During the year 1927, the first ever seen radio broadcasting transmitter was built by Edward Rogers. This was seen as a significant advancement because it operated from power lines without the assistance of batteries or converters. Rogers Batteryless was born from this invention.

In 1939, Edward Rogers died, and his son was only six years old. The Rogers family had involvement in Canada's broadcasting until about the mid-1940s; Velma, Edwards's wife, sold her shares away in Standard Radio Limited. Sixteen years later, the business would resurface again due to the son of Edward Rogers, Ted.

Rogers Media business began in 1960, when Ted borrowed $85,000 to buy Canada's first FM radio station, CHFI. That year, Rogers and Aldred formed Baton Aldred Rogers Broadcasting (a forerunner to present-day competitor Bell Media) when it acquired the license for CFTO-DT, which launched the following year. In 1962, Rogers bought Aldred's shares of CHFI, which changed its name to CHFI-FM Limited, then Rogers Broadcasting Ltd. By 1964, CHFI-AM, which would eventually become CFTR went on air.

In 1986, Rogers acquired CFMT, Canada's first multicultural station. It also received many stations from Selkirk Communications in 1989.

In the most significant acquisition to date, Rogers Media acquired the assets of Maclean Hunter broadcasting properties in 1994. It later resold various properties to Western International Communications and sold CFCN-TV to Baton Broadcasting Inc in 1996.

In 2000, Bell GlobeMedia acquired NetStar, the parent company of TSN, and ultimately divested their stake in Sportsnet, making it a sister channel to CFMT and giving them full ownership.

=== 2007–2013: Acquisition of Citytv and The Score ===
In June 2007, as part of CTVglobemedia's acquisition of CHUM Limited, Rogers announced its intent to acquire its Citytv stations. CTV had originally intended initially intended to sell CHUM's A-Channel stations and several other specialty channels to Rogers. Still, the CRTC required the Citytv stations to be divested to comply with major-market ownership restrictions. CTV maintained ownership of flagship Toronto station CITY-TV's local news channel CP24, prompting Rogers to establish its own short-lived CityNews Channel in 2011 as a substitute, in cooperation with CITY-TV and sister news radio station 680 CFTR. The network folded in 2013.

On January 16, 2008, the CRTC rejected an application by Rogers to establish a new rock radio station in Parry Sound, citing that it would have a disproportionately negative impact on its North Bay stations and local competitor CKLP-FM/.

Rogers acquired a minority interest in the web-based video production firm Vuguru in 2009. In 2010, Rogers received CHST-FM in London, Ontario, from CTVglobemedia.

In 2011, Rogers announced a partnership with FX Networks to launch a Canadian version of FX. The channel was launched as FX Canada on October 31, 2011, with FX Networks acquiring a minority stake later that year.

On August 25, 2012, Rogers Media acquired Score Media's broadcast business, including The Score Television Network, for $167 million, including a 10% stake in its digital business. The network has since been rebranded as Sportsnet 360.

=== 2013–2017: NHL, WWE, and Vice deals ===
On November 26, 2013, Rogers announced that it would become the exclusive national media rightsholder for the National Hockey League (NHL) beginning in the 2014–15 season under a 12-year contract valued at $5.2 billion. This gave Rogers rights to broadcast national telecasts on the Sportsnet networks and CBC Television (the latter as part of a sub-licensing agreement to maintain Hockey Night in Canada) and handle distribution for the NHL's out-of-market packages.

On April 1, 2014, a Canadian version of FX's younger-skewing sibling network, FXX, and the "FXNOW Canada" app were launched.

On August 1, 2014, Rogers reached a deal with American professional wrestling promotion WWE. An expansion of Sportsnet 360's existing deal with the promotion as The Score, the network would continue to be the exclusive broadcaster of WWE's weekly television programming, while Rogers would distribute the linear feed of the WWE Network.

In October 2014, Rogers announced a $100 million joint venture with Vice Media to establish a production studio in Toronto and launch Vice-branded television and digital properties in 2015. The following year, on November 5, 2015, Rogers and Vice announced that it would launch a Canadian version of Vice's specialty cable channel, Viceland, in Canada on February 29, 2016. The new channel would replace the Canadian version of The Biography Channel; a brand which was also owned by Vice Media investor A+E Networks.

In September 2016, Rogers acquired Tillsonburg Broadcasting Company's CJDL-FM and CKOT-FM in Tillsonburg. In January 2018, Rogers announced its acquisition of CJCY-FM in Medicine Hat, Alberta, from Clear Sky Radio.

In December 2016, the Canadian Cosmetic, Toiletry and Fragrance Association, the lead Canadian trade association for the personal care products industry, acquired the magazine Cosmetics and its two flagship events: the Cosmetics Outstanding Service Awards (COSAs) and the Canadian Fragrance Awards.

=== 2017–2023: Sale and shuttering of assets ===
Following an announcement on July 5, 2017, and over two years after the shuttering of its U.S. namesake, the Canadian version of G4 shut down on August 31, 2017.

After Rogers pulled out of its venture with Vice, Viceland shut down on March 31, 2018.

In March 2019, Rogers announced that it would sell its remaining print publications, including Maclean's, Chatelaine, and Hello! Canada, Today's Parent, and the digital operations of former magazines Canadian Business and Flare to St. Joseph Communications.

Rogers Sports & Media logo from 2020 to 2024

In February 2020, Rogers Media was rebranded as Rogers Sports & Media to "more accurately [reflect] our mix of assets." However, the subsidiary's legal name did not change.

In November 2023, Rogers reached an agreement with Disney Streaming to handle advertising sales for the ad-supported version of Disney+ in Canada.

=== 2024–present: New licensing agreements ===
On June 10, 2024, Rogers Sports & Media announced a licensing agreement with Warner Bros. Discovery (WBD) beginning in 2025. Under the agreement Rogers will hold the Canadian rights to WBD's factual brands, including Animal Planet, Discovery Channel, Food Network, HGTV, Investigation Discovery (ID), Magnolia Network, Motor Trend, the Oprah Winfrey Network (OWN) and Science Channel. Content will be distributed via new and existing Rogers platforms, including its television networks and Citytv+. Rogers also announced an agreement with NBCUniversal to relaunch Bravo in Canada (Note: The original Canadian incarnation of Bravo was launched by CHUM Limited in 1995. It would later by acquired by Bell Media's predecessor, CTVglobemedia, and eventually relaunched as CTV Drama Channel following a format change in the late 2000s) in September 2024. Rogers' agreement with WBD succeeds long-time partnerships the latter company had with Bell Media (Note: At the time of the announcement, Bell Media managed the Canadian versions of the factual properties, other than OWN, inherited by WBD from the pre-2018 Discovery Communications (including Discovery Channel and its branded siblings) through CTV Specialty Television Inc., a partnership with ESPN Inc. dating back to the launch of NetStar Communications formed after Interbrew's acquisition of Labatt in 1995.) and Corus Entertainment, (Note: At the time of the announcement, Corus Entertainment managed the Canadian versions of WBD properties that were inherited from Scripps Networks Interactive (such as Food Network and HGTV) and OWN. The majority ownership of some of these networks date back to the days of Alliance Atlantis. Corus was also a marketing partner for the Canadian launch of Discovery+.) while the Bravo relaunch would be Rogers' third collaboration on a Canadian TV channel with Comcast after the launches of OLN and G4. (Note: Rogers Cable also has a technology partnership with Comcast, including use of the X1 IPTV platform for its Ignite TV service.)

In a statement to The Gazette media writer Steve Faguy, a Bell Media spokesperson stated that their agreements with Discovery "includes protections against the launch of competing services", and that they "fully intend to assert our rights with a view to protecting our business." Bell subsequently filed for a court injunction to prevent Rogers from operating channels under the relevant brands for at least two years after the Rogers deal takes effect, citing non-compete clauses in its outgoing agreement, along with monetary damages from both Rogers and WBD. Bell further alleged that Rogers induced WBD to break the non-complete clauses in question. Subsequently, Rogers filed documents asserting that WBD had failed to disclose the non-compete clauses to Rogers. On August 30, Bell said that in light of that revelation, it was no longer seeking monetary damages from Rogers, but would proceed with claims against WBD; including injunctive relief.

Corus also retaliated by filing a complaint with the CRTC in August 2024, accusing Rogers Communications as a whole of abusing a dominant position due to Rogers Cable offering the ad-supported version of Disney+ to Ignite TV subscribers, and promoting the service adjacent to Corus' Disney-licensed specialty services in the Ignite TV program guide. Rogers countered that Corus "has not kept up with the demands of Canadians and is now looking for the regulator to protect their broken business model" and accused Corus of forcing service providers to carry channels that consumers "no longer want to watch."

On August 28, Rogers announced that it would launch new specialty channels for the Discovery, Food Network, HGTV, ID and Magnolia Network brands on January 1, 2025, while content from Animal Planet, Cooking Channel, Motor Trend, OWN and Science Channel would stream on Citytv+. Rogers would also confirm that OLN would be rebranded as Bravo on September 1.

On September 10, 2024, Rogers launched a new internet radio and podcast app known as Seekr, which carries radio stations and podcasts from across the Rogers Sports & Media division. The company will continue its existing partnership with Radioplayer Canada. On September 18, 2024, Rogers announced that it would acquire Bell's 37.5% stake in Maple Leaf Sports & Entertainment (MLSE) for CA$4.7 billion, expanding its stake to 75%. The stake was consolidated into the Rogers Sports & Media division.

On October 8, 2024, Bell announced that it had settled with WBD, agreeing to a renewal of its licensing agreements for HBO and Warner Bros. content on its streaming service Crave, as well as co-production and distribution pacts.

On July 6, 2026, Rogers announced that it would exercise its option to acquire the remaining stake in MLSE it does not already own from Larry Tanenbaum, which will make it sole owner. The next day, Rogers announced that it would close six radio stations effective immediately, including CFAC Calgary, CJNI-FM Halifax, CKGL Kitchener, and CISL and CKWX Vancouver. The company cited "declining audience and revenue trends". On October 1, Rogers completed the purchase of remaining 25% of MLSE. They intend to create a new business unit called Rogers Sports which will include MLSE and Rogers' other sports assets including the Toronto Blue Jays.
