= Nicolò Gagliano =

18th-century Italian luthier

Nicolò Gagliano (active. c. 1730s – 1787 in Naples, although there is some discussion about the exact dates) (also known as Nicolo, Nicola or Nicolaus Gagliano - also sometimes known as Nicolò I, to differentiate him from Nicolò II, his grandson), was an Italian violin-maker, the eldest son of Alessandro Gagliano. He made many admirable instruments, often imitated. Some have been mistaken for those of Stradivari. Nicolò was a more prolific maker than his brother Gennaro (Januarius). Nicolò and Gennaro are considered the greatest luthiers in the Gagliano family and the pinnacle of Neapolitan violin-making. Although Nicolò's work is not always entirely consistent in quality, it often shows great distinction. His instruments have bold and well-proportioned archings, with the instrument scrolls having a distinctive elongated pegbox and small tight spiral. He often placed a small label with a religious dedication inside his instruments.

Nicolò Gagliano had four sons, all makers — Ferdinando, Giuseppe (Joseph), Antonio, and Giovanni. Giuseppe's three sons Raffaele, Antonio and Nicolò (II) were also violin makers and carried the family's violin-making tradition into the middle of the 19th century.

Typical labels:

Nicolaii Gagliano fecit
in Napoli 1711

Nicolaus Gagliano filius
Alexandri fecit Neap. 1732

== See also ==
- Gagliano family
