= Gagliano family =

Family of Italian luthiers

Gagliano is the name of a famous family of Italian luthiers from Naples, dating back to the early 18th century. The Gagliano dynasty – particularly Alessandro, Nicolò I and Gennaro – are considered the high point of Neapolitan violin making. There are as many as eighteen Gagliano violin makers known worldwide today. Below is a family tree of a few of its most recognizable luthiers.

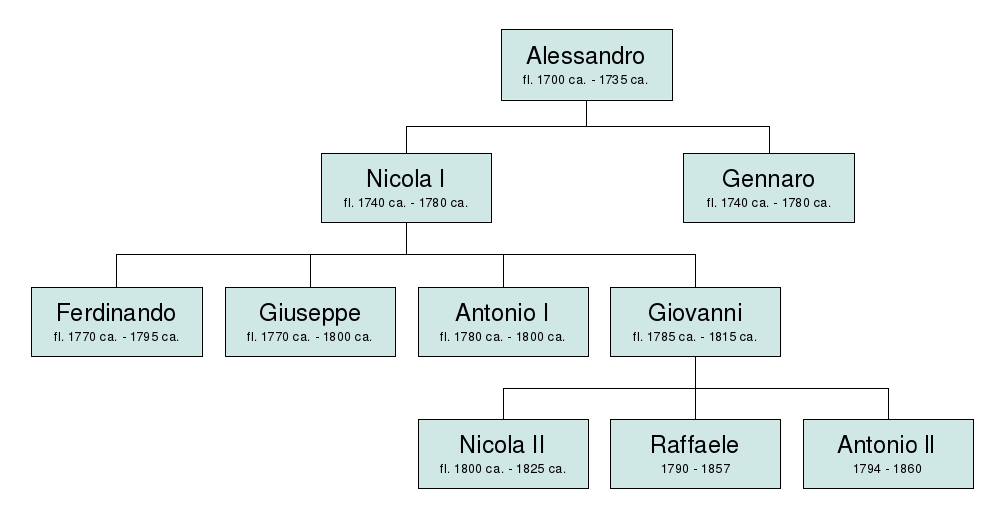
Main exponents of Gagliano family.

== Alessandro Gagliano ==
(c. 1700 – c. 1735) Naples, Italy. As a youth, Alessandro worked in the shops of famed luthiers Nicolo Amati and Antonio Stradivari. After returning to Naples from Cremona, he became the founder of the Neapolitan school. Authentic examples of his instruments in good condition are scarce. A few violas, cellos, one double bass, and several violins have survived.

- Typical label:

Alexandri [or Alessandro] Gagliano
Alumnus Antonio Stradivarius
fecit Anno 1722

== Nicolò Gagliano I ==
(active c. 1730 – 27 August 1787) Naples, Italy. Nicolò Gagliano (also known as Nicolo, Nicola or the Latinised Nicolaus) was the eldest son of Alessandro and is generally considered the most famous luthier of the Gagliano family (he is known as Nicolò I to differentiate him from his grandson Nicolò II). He made many admirable instruments in his long life. His instruments have often been copied or imitated, and were occasionally even mistaken for those of Antonio Stradivari.

- Typical labels:

Nicolaii Gagliano fecit
in Napoli 1711
or
Nicolaus Gagliano filius
Alexandri fecit Neap. 1752

== Gennaro Gagliano ==
(active c. 1740 – c. 1780) Naples, Italy. The second son of Alessandro, Gennaro (also known by his Latinised name Januarius) created some well-made instruments and had a prominent position in the family.

== Ferdinando Gagliano ==
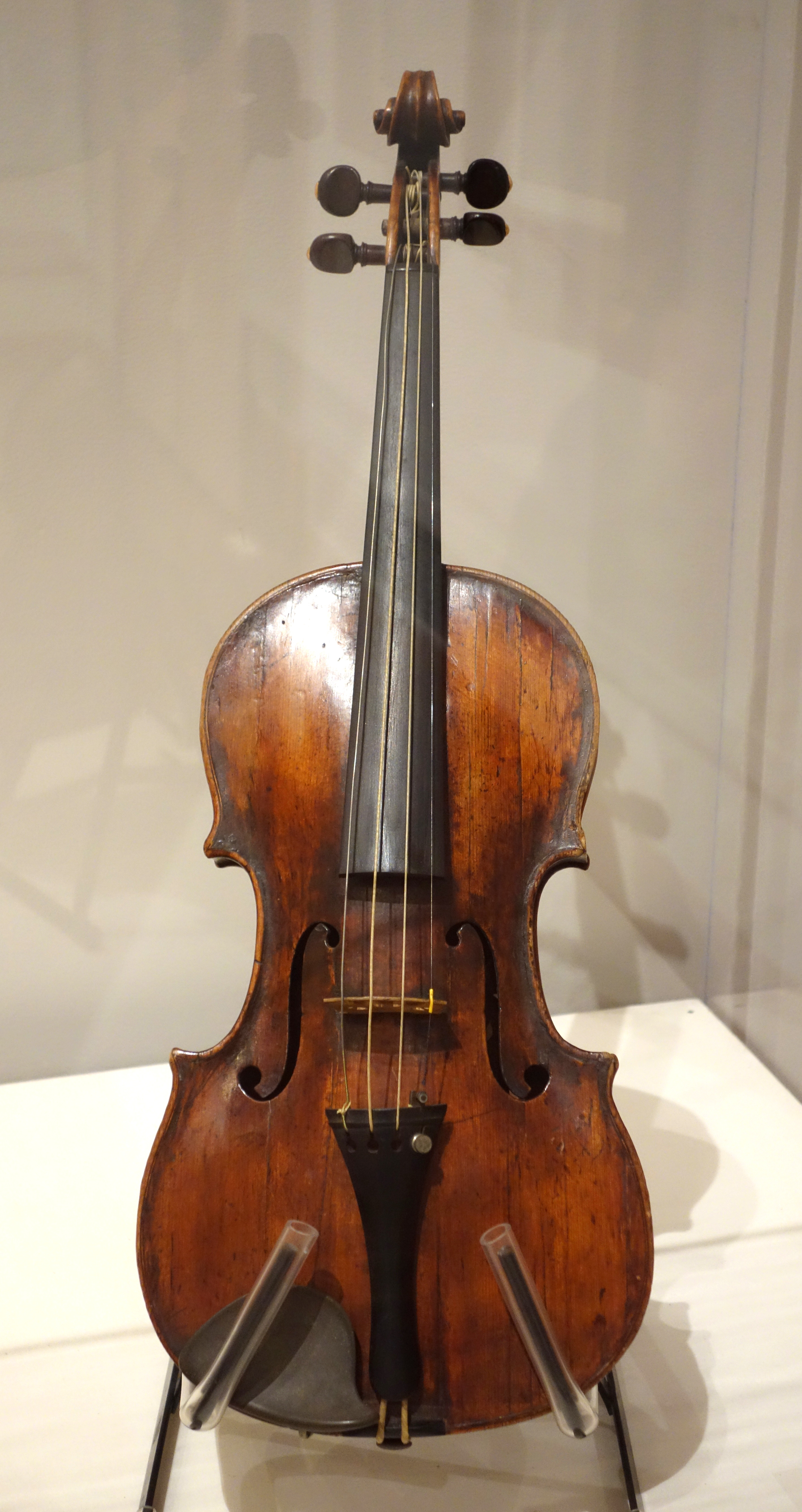
Violin by Ferdinando Gagliano, c. 1760

(born 1724, active c. 1770 – c. 1795) Naples, Italy. Ferdinando was the eldest son of Nicolò I, although probably taught by his uncle Gennaro. He made some magnificent as well as undistinguished instruments. However, he had a prodigious output of instruments. Occasionally, instruments with his label were actually made by his father or his brother.

Labels: Ferdinandus Gagliano Filius / Nicolai, Fecit Neap. 17..

Ferdinando Gagliano, me fecit / Neapoli, anno 17..
