= Gaetano Gagliano =

Gaetano Gagliano CM
- Born: August 24, 1917; Cattolica Eraclea, Sicily, Italy
- Died: April 14, 2016 (aged 98); Woodbridge, Ontario, Canada
- Citizenship: Canadian
- Known for: Founder of St. Joseph Communications
- Spouse: Giuseppina Gagliano
- Children: 10, including Tony Gagliano

Gaetano Gagliano CM (Italian: [ɡaeˈtaːno gaʎˈʎaːno]; August 24, 1917 – April 14, 2016) was an Italian-born Canadian entrepreneur who founded St. Joseph Communications and Salt + Light Television.

== Career and family ==
Gagliano was born in Cattolica Eraclea, Sicily, on August 24, 1917, and immigrated to Toronto, Ontario, Canada in 1956. He first worked for the Canadian Pacific Railway before launching St. Joseph Communications which eventually became the largest private communications company in Canada. He and his wife, Giuseppina, had 10 children, including Tony. Gagliano died on April 14, 2016, at his home in Woodbridge, Ontario, at the age of 98.

== Honours ==
He was named a Knight of the Order of St. Sylvester in 1992, and a Member of the Order of Canada in 1998. He has received honorary doctorates from Canadian Universities. In 2007, he was made a Commander (or Commendatore in Italian) of the Order of the Star of Solidarity from the Government of Italy.
