= Flare (magazine) =

Canadian fashion magazine

- October 2010 cover
- Categories: Fashion magazine
- Frequency: Monthly
- Total circulation: 124,646 (December 2011)
- Founded: 1979
- Final issue: December 2016 (print)
- Company: St. Joseph Communications
- Country: Canada
- Based in: Toronto
- Language: English
- Website: fashionmagazine.com/flare
- ISSN: 0708-4927

Flare was a Canadian online fashion magazine in print until 2016. Owned by St. Joseph Communications, it was an online brand until 2021 and was folded into Fashion magazine in early 2023.

== History ==
Flare was created by Maclean-Hunter publishing in 1979, as a rebranding of Miss Chatelaine magazine. Flare promoted itself as "Canada's Fashion magazine". While cover stories often featured American or international stars, Flare otherwise focused largely on Canadian content and its role in international art, fashion, and media. In addition to runway and street fashion from Canada and abroad, the magazine covered music and entertainment, health and beauty, and feature stories relevant to young Canadian women. Flare celebrated its 30th anniversary on November 5, 2009, with a reception and party at the Royal Ontario Museum.

Flare was the brainchild of Donna Scott, who was assigned by Maclean-Hunter management to two of its magazines, Teen Generation and Miss Chatelaine. Scott concluded the run of both magazines and created Flare, aimed at young career women who, until that time, only had access to American fashion magazines. Under the direction of its first editor, Keitha Maclean, Flare became Canada's first successful fashion magazine. Donna Scott retired from Flare and went on to chair the Canada Council for the Arts. She was named an Officer of the Order of Canada in 1994. Subsequent editors included Shelley Black, Bonnie Fuller, and Suzanne Boyd, and Lisa Tant. By 2011, Flare was the top selling fashion magazine in Canada. The position was last held by Charlotte Herrold.

The print edition of Flare terminated at the end of 2016. Beginning in January 2017, the magazine was to publish online only.

On March 20, 2019, Rogers announced a deal to sell the magazine to St. Joseph Communications.

In 2021, Flare became a sub-brand of FASHION magazine and Flare.com content became a pillar on FASHION's website. In February 2023, the Flare brand was dissolved and content was absorbed into the Culture section of FASHION's website and the Flare.com website was removed.
