= Canadian Business =

Canadian magazine

- 18 June 2007 cover of Canadian Business
- Categories: Business
- Frequency: Biweekly
- Total circulation (December 2011): 80,064
- Founded: 1927
- First issue: February 1928
- Final issue: December 2016
- Company: St. Joseph Communications
- Country: Canada
- Based in: Toronto
- Language: English
- Website: www.canadianbusiness.com
- ISSN: 0008-3100

Canadian Business is the longest-publishing business magazine based in Toronto, Ontario, Canada, and founded in 1927. The print edition terminated in the end of 2016. Beginning in January 2017, the magazine was published online only.

In October 2021, Canadian Business relaunched its print edition as a quarterly magazine.

== History and profile ==
The magazine was founded in 1927. The first issue appeared in February 1928 as The Commerce of the Nation, the organ of the Canadian Chamber of Commerce. The magazine was renamed Canadian Business in 1933. Canadian Business official association with the Chamber of Commerce ended in 1977, the position of official media partner is currently held by George Media's The Canadian Business Journal. It is owned by Rogers Communications. The company acquired the magazine in 1994. The former owner was Maclean Hunter.

Canadian Business is published every second week, monthly in January, July and August. Its special annual issues include: the Rich 100 (highlighting the wealthiest Canadians), the Investor 500 (comparing the largest 500 publicly listed Canadian companies), All-Star Execs (about the best corporate executives), the MBA Report, and the Best and Worst Boards.

Its main direct competition comes from Report on Business Magazine, published by and inserted in The Globe and Mail newspaper, Financial Post Magazine, formerly National Post Business, published by and inserted in the National Post newspaper and The Canadian Business Journal business magazine published by George Media.

Profit, targeting small and mid-sized businesses, is a sister title under the same ownership.

On March 20, 2019, Rogers announced a deal to sell the magazine to St. Joseph Communications.

== Annual report on wealthiest Canadians ==
For nearly 20 years, Canadian Business published an annual list of the "100 Richest Canadians." The list was last published in 2017.

See List of Canadians by net worth

=== 2008 ===
In 2008 the Canadian Business magazine's annual report on the wealthiest Canadians calculated that the Irving family combined wealth rose 34 percent from 2007 to $US 7.11 billion. Only the Thompson family, with a net worth is $US 18.45 billion, are wealthier

=== 2012 ===
In their annual report on Canada's wealthiest, Canadian Business magazine described Ultra High Net Worth (UHNW) Canadians as having a very profitable year. The wealthiest are now among the 0.00028%, not just the 1%. Frank Stronach's net was $US 2.72 Billion in 2011-2012. The Chan family's net worth was $US 1.03 billion. JR Shaw's net worth was $US 1.5 billion up 4.41 percent from last year.
