= Today's Parent =

- Editor-in-chief: Vanessa Grant, (acting), Megan Sweeney
- Former editors: Kim Shiffman (2018-2023), Sasha Emmons (2013-2018), Karine Ewart (2011-2013), Caroline Connell (2006-2011), Linda Lewis (1997-2006), Fran Fearnley (1987-1997), Beverly L. Topping (1984-1987)
- Categories: Consumer magazine
- Frequency: Bi-monthly
- Total circulation: 165,056
- Founder: Beverly L. Topping
- First issue: December 1984
- Company: St. Joseph Communications
- Country: Canada
- Based in: Toronto, Ontario
- Language: English
- Website: www.todaysparent.com
- ISSN: 0823-9258

Today's Parent is a Canadian bi-monthly magazine for parents of children from birth to age 14. Topics like health, education, behaviour, and nutrition are covered each month. Due to falling print ad revenues, Today's Parent was published on a monthly basis and reduced its publication frequency to six times a year effective January 2017.

== History ==
Before launching Today's Parent, founder Beverly Topping acquired the pregnancy publication Great Expectations in 1983, hoping to use the mailing list to promote a parenting magazine.

Today's Parent was first published in December 1984 as a 48-page saddle-stitched book. The magazine was originally published bimonthly and distributed through doctor offices. It did not reach newsstands until Rogers Publishing Ltd purchased the magazine.

In 2003, Today's Parent won the gold award in the parenting magazine category from Folio Magazine, the trade publication for the US magazine industry.

In the Canadian National Magazine Awards, the magazine has been repeatedly recognized, having won 4 gold medals (in 1992, 2003, 2011, and 2012) and a silver medal (2004). In 2012, Today's Parent won the Magazine of the Year — Digital award for its website.

Karine Ewart became editor-in-chief in June 2011, after Caroline Connell left the position in February 2011. After spending three years as executive editor, Connell was promoted to editor-in-chief in September 2006 when Linda Lewis resigned to launch More magazine at Transcontinental Media.

Under Ewart's editorial direction, the magazine emphasized a variety of real-life stories from parents while balancing expert testimonials from pediatricians and psychologists. Ewart's parenting motto was, "Whatever works for your family is the right answer".

Since its March 2012 issue, Today's Parent has undergone a redesign to foster a sense of community between its readers/parents. The magazine introduced more lifestyle content (topics like fashion, beauty, travel and finance) in shorter pieces. The food section was also revamped, focusing more on images and simple recipes with accompanying grocery lists.

In January 2014, Sasha Emmons was named editor-in-chief. In 2017, the print magazine became bi-monthly. In June 2017, Rogers Media launched the Today's Parent Mealtime app.

In August 2018, Kim Shiffman became editor-in-chief of the magazine. Former editor-in-chief Sasha Emmons was promoted to director of lifestyle content.

On March 20, 2019, Rogers announced a deal to sell the magazine to St. Joseph Communications.

== Circulation ==
Today's Parent has a circulation of between 73,000 and 90,000 and claims an audience of 1.3 million readers.
