= Edward Rogers =

Edward or Ted Rogers may refer to:

- Edward Rogers (MP), English member of parliament for Kingston upon Hull, 1545
- Edward Rogers (died 1627), English MP for Minehead, 1584
- Sir Edward Rogers (comptroller) (c. 1498–1568), Comptroller and Vice-Chamberlain of the Household to Elizabeth I of England
- Edward Rogers (composer), American musician and composer for film, television and videogames
- Edward S. Rogers Sr. (1900–1939), Canadian radio pioneer and businessman
  - Edward S. Rogers Jr. (1933–2008), Canadian business magnate, founder of Rogers Communications, son of Edward S. Rogers Sr.
    - Edward S. Rogers III (born 1969), Canadian businessman, chairman of Rogers Communications, son of Edward S. Rogers Jr.
- Edward Rogers (Methodist) (1909–1997), president of the Methodist Church of Great Britain in 1960
- Edward Rogers (American politician) (1787–1857), American politician, U.S. representative from New York
- Ed Rogers (born 1978), Dominican baseball player in Major League Baseball
- Eddie Rogers (1876–1971), American football player
- Ted Rogers (comedian) (1933–2001), English comedian and host of 3-2-1
- Ted Rogers (Doctor Who), character in the Doctor Who series The Tomb of the Cybermen played by Alan Johns
