= Ted Rogers School of Management =

Business school of Toronto Metropolitan University

- The school's facility at Dundas and Bay Street
- Former name: Faculty of Business (1948–2007)
- Type: Public business school
- Established: 1948; 78 years ago
- Parent institution: Toronto Metropolitan University
- Accreditation: AACSB International
- Faculty: 300+
- Students: 13,000+
- Location: Toronto, Ontario, Canada; 43°39′19″N 79°22′59″W
- Named for: Edward S. Rogers Jr.
- Website: torontomu.ca/tedrogersschool

The Ted Rogers School of Management (TRSM) is the business school of Toronto Metropolitan University (TMU) in Toronto, Ontario, Canada. Established during the university's founding in 1948, it adopted its present name in 2007 following a donation from Rogers Communications president Edward S. "Ted" Jr. and Loretta Rogers. With more than 13,000 students, it is the largest business school in Canada by enrolment.

The school's main building is located at 55 Dundas Street West in downtown Yonge.

== History ==
The school was founded as the Faculty of Business in 1948 upon the establishment of the Ryerson Institute of Technology, known today as Toronto Metropolitan University.

In May 2007, TMU received a $15-million donation from Ted and Loretta Rogers, and the faculty was renamed as the Ted Rogers School of Management in their honour. In 2011, the school earned accreditation from the Association to Advance Collegiate Schools of Business (AACSB). In 2024, the TRSM renamed its main auditorium as The Steve & Rashmi Gupta Lecture Theatre following a $1-million donation from Steve and Rashmi Gupta.

== Academics ==
The Ted Rogers School of Management hosts 14 undergraduate programs, graduate programs including a Master of Business Administration (MBA), and a Doctor of Philosophy (PhD) in management. The Ted Rogers MBA program offers a sport business focus.

=== Rankings and reputation ===
In the 2027 QS World University Rankings for full-time MBAs, the Ted Rogers School of Management ranked in the top 301+ globally and tied with several institutions for 18th in Canada. In Times Higher Education's Business and Economics World University Rankings 2026, TMU was ranked in the top 401–500 globally.

== Notable people ==
Notable alumni of the Ted Rogers School of Management include Tony Gagliano, executive chairman and CEO of St. Joseph Communications, and Patrick Dovigi, founder and CEO of GFL Environmental.

== See also ==
- List of business schools in Canada
