= Elias Rogers =

19th-century Canadian businessman

Elias Rogers (June 23, 1850 – April 11, 1920) was a Canadian business magnate, banker, and politician. He was a major coal dealer in Canada and founder, with his brother Samuel, of the Elias Rogers Company in Toronto.

His great-grandfather was Timothy Rogers (1756–1834), a Canadian pioneer and Quaker leader who founded settlements in what became Newmarket and Pickering.

== Biography ==
Rogers was born in Whitchurch, near Newmarket, to a Quaker family. He began in the lumber business before switching to coal, purchasing the first coal mines in Jefferson County, Pennsylvania.

Rogers was elected to Toronto City Council in 1887 as alderman for St. Lawrence Ward. He ran for mayor of Toronto the next year on a temperance platform but was defeated by Edward Frederick Clarke, after one of Clarke's supporters, Member of Parliament Nathaniel Clarke Wallace, accused Rogers of being involved in a coal price fixing ring.

He was president of National Life Assurance Company and vice-president of the Imperial Bank of Canada. He died in 1920 and is buried in Mount Pleasant Cemetery, Toronto.

Rogers' nephew, Albert Stephen Rogers, was the father of Edward S. Rogers Sr., founder of the Rogers Vacuum Tube Company, whose son Ted Rogers, founded Rogers Communications.
