= Anik (satellite) =

Series of Canadian satellites by Telesat

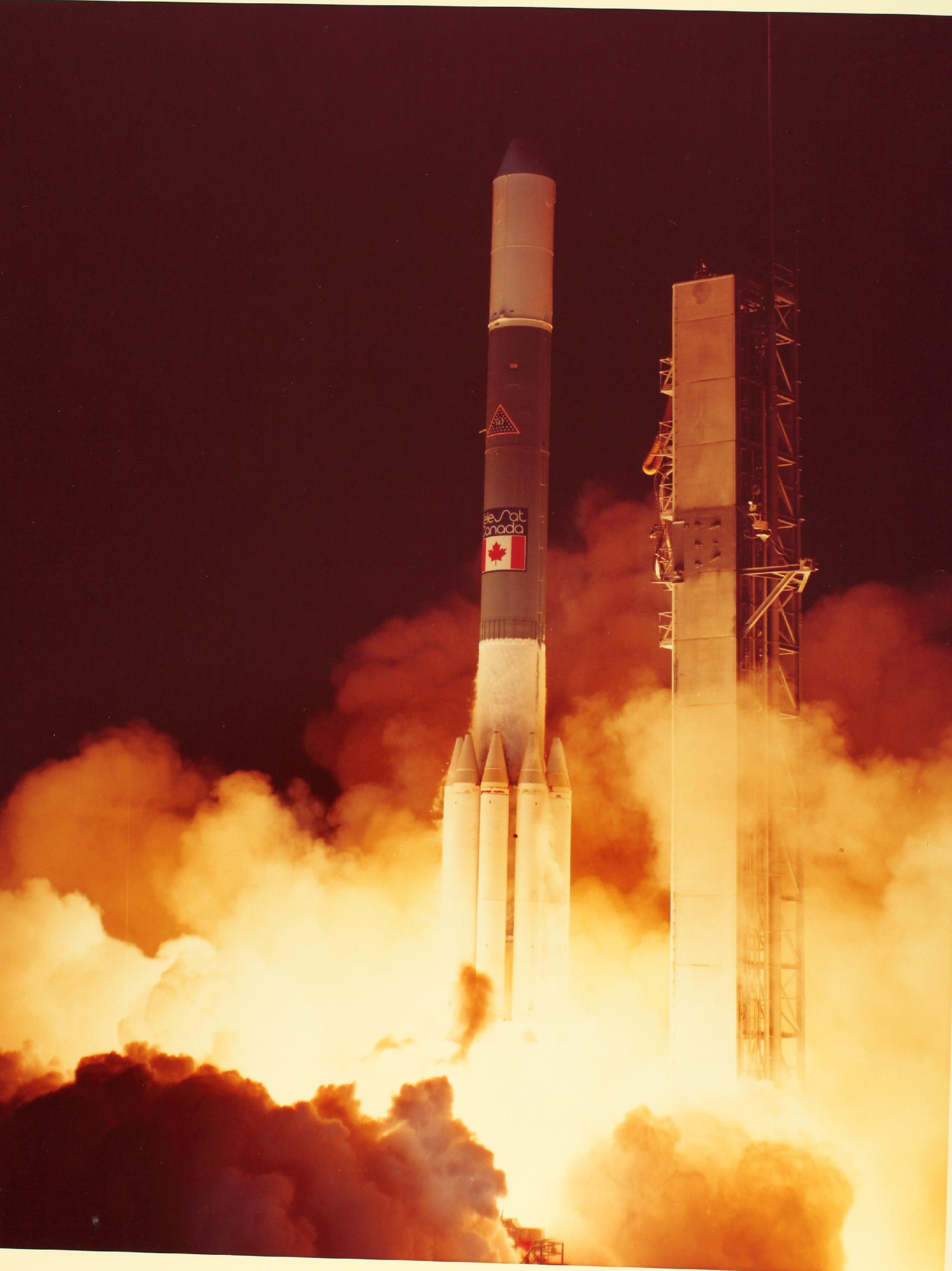
Launch of Anik B1 in December 1978

The Anik satellites are a series of geostationary communications satellites launched for Telesat Canada for television, voice and data in Canada and other parts of the world, from 1972 through 2013. Some of the later satellites in the series remain operational in orbit, while others have been retired to a graveyard orbit. The naming of the satellite was determined by a national contest, and was won by Julie-Frances Czapla of Saint-Léonard, Québec. In Inuktitut, Anik means "brother".

== Satellites ==
Name	Satellite type	Launched	Retired	Launch vehicle
Anik A1	Hughes Aircraft HS-333	November 9, 1972	July 15, 1982	Delta 1914
Anik A2	Hughes Aircraft HS-333	April 20, 1973	October 6, 1982	Delta 1914
Anik A3	Hughes Aircraft HS-333	May 7, 1975	November 21, 1984	Delta 2914
Anik B1	RCA Astro Satcom	December 15, 1978	December 1, 1986	Delta 3914
Anik C1	Hughes Aircraft HS-376	April 12, 1985	May 5, 2003	Space Shuttle Discovery
Anik C2	Hughes Aircraft HS-376	June 18, 1983	January 7, 1998	Space Shuttle Challenger
Anik C3	Hughes Aircraft HS-376	November 11, 1982	June 18, 1997	Space Shuttle Columbia
Anik D1	Hughes Aircraft HS-376	August 26, 1982	December 16, 1991	Delta 3920
Anik D2	Hughes Aircraft HS-376	November 8, 1984	January 31, 1995	Space Shuttle Discovery
Anik E1	GE Astro 5000	September 26, 1991	January 18, 2005	Ariane 44P
Anik E2	GE Astro 5000	April 4, 1991	November 23, 2005	Ariane 44P
Anik F1	HS 702	November 21, 2000	November 2024	Ariane 44L
Anik F2	Boeing 702	July 17, 2004	Still in use	Ariane 5 G
Anik F1R	Eurostar E3000	September 9, 2005	Still in use	Proton M / Briz-M
Anik F3	Eurostar E3000	April 10, 2007	Still in use	Proton M / Briz-M
Anik G1	SSL 1300	April 16, 2013	Still in use	Proton M / Briz-M

=== Anik A ===
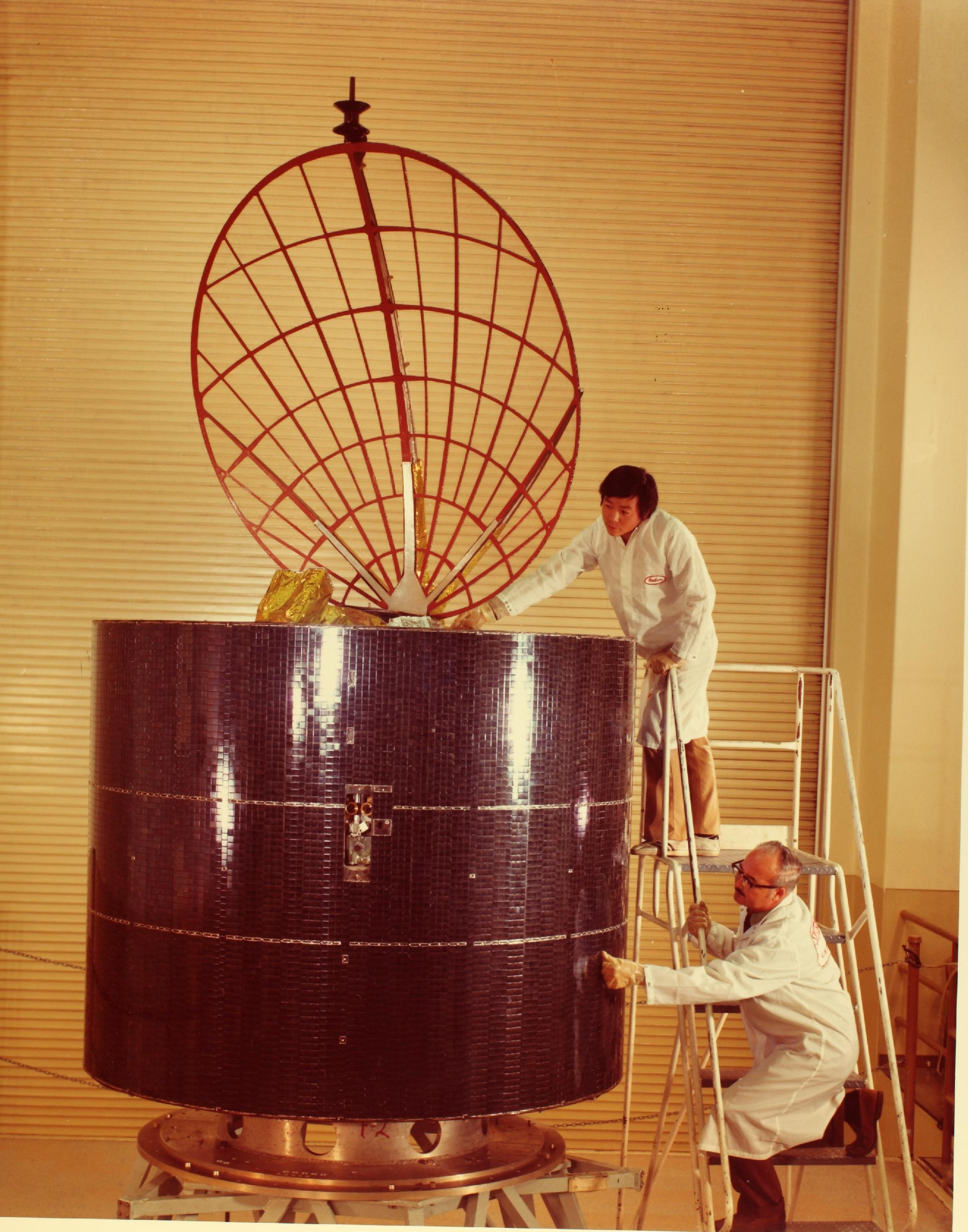
Inspection of an Anik A in the early 1970s

The Anik A satellites were the world's first national domestic satellites. (Prior to Anik A1's launch, all geosynchronous communications satellites were transcontinental, i.e. Intelsat I and others.) The Anik A fleet of three satellites gave CBC the ability to reach the Canadian North for the first time. Each of the satellites was equipped with 12 C-band transponders that were capable of one broadcast-quality television signal, or 960 telephone calls., and thus had the capacity for a total of 12 colour television channels or 11,520 telephone calls. Three channels were allocated for CBC, two to TCTS and CNCP Telecommunications, two to Bell Canada, one for Canadian Overseas Telecommunications. Two channels were put in reserve and the remaining two were unallocated (future use).

=== Anik B ===
It was launched on December 15, 1978, and was the successor to the Anik A series and Hermes (aka Communications Technology Satellite, or CTS) experimental satellite. Most of the transponders were devoted to CBC Television — East and West feeds of CBC North, CBC Parliamentary Television Network, CITV-TV Edmonton, CHCH Hamilton, and TVOntario.

CNCP Telecommunications also used Anik B as a relay for its services. The Globe and Mail used Anik B to transmit copy to printing plants across Canada.

=== Anik C ===
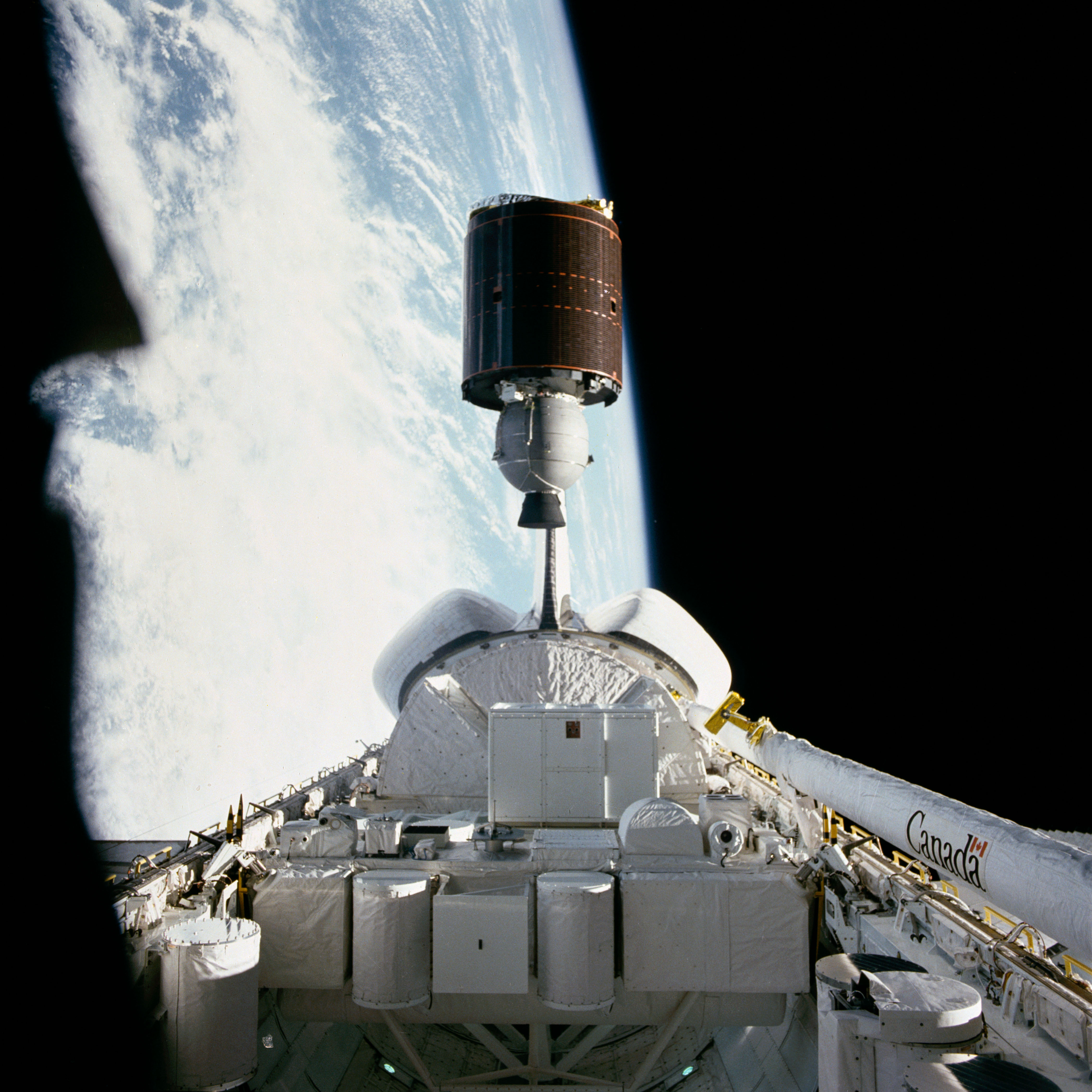
The Canadian Telesat-F (Anik C2) communications satellite in June 1983 is deployed by the shuttle Challenger to begin its way to its earth-orbital destination.

The Anik C satellite series tripled the power output of the Anik A series. Anik C also allowed a significant increase in telecommunications capacity over Anik A. Each Anik C satellite had sixteen Ku-band transponders.

Anik C3 was used to distribute most of Canada's first pay television networks – First Choice, Superchannel, C-Channel, and Star Channel – which launched on February 1, 1983. (World View, an ethnic service in British Columbia, was not distributed via Anik or any other satellite system.)

Anik C3 transponder lineup (1983):

- 02 - Atlantic Satellite Network
- 03 - Assiniboia Downs Racing Network
- 06 - Super Écran TV payante
- 10 - Radio-Québec
- 14 - La Sette 2
- 15 - Knowledge
- 16 - La Sette 1
- 17 - Access Alberta
- 18 - TFO
- 19 - Premier Choix/TVEC TV payante
- 20 - TVOntario
- 23 - Superchannel
- 24 - TVOntario-Legislature Channel
- 25 - CHSC Canadian Home Shopping Club (West feed)
- 27 - Knowledge Network
- 30 - First Choice
- 32 - CHSC Canadian Home Shopping Club (East feed)

=== Anik D ===
Anik D1 and Anik D2 series C-Band satellites were launched in 1982 and 1984. They were based on the HS-376 of Hughes design.

=== Anik E ===
Anik E1 and Anik E2 were launched in the early 1990s to replace Anik D1 and Anik D2. Unlike the cylinder-shaped spin-stabilised satellites of the D-series, these were cubical, 3-axis satellites using momentum wheels for attitude stabilisation.

Anik E2 experienced an anomaly during deployment of its C-band antenna, which was successfully deployed after several corrective maneuvers.

On Thursday, January 20, 1994, Anik E1 and Anik E2 suffered problems due to solar activity. Anik E1 failed first at 17:50 UTC, knocking out satellite-delivered television signals in Canada. After a few hours, Telesat managed to restore normal functions on Anik E1 at 00:15 UTC, on 21 January 1994. At 01:00 UTC, both the primary and redundant Anik E2 momentum wheels failed, thus eliminating the gyroscope effect that helps keep the satellite pointed correctly towards Earth. The exact problem lay with the circuitry having to do with the stabilizing momentum wheel. Anik E2 was not restored to service for five months; users had to relocate services to Anik E1 and reposition satellite dishes; for some users, such as Northwestel in northern Canada, it meant days of flying technicians from one community to another to reposition the dishes.

Telesat ultimately restored Anik E2 by constructing special earth stations at each end of the country to monitor the satellite's position, and designed specialised software to use a combination of its control jets and magnetic torquing coils to finely position the satellite. Even though a small amount of extra stationkeeping fuel was needed for pitch control, the efficiencies from using the magnetic coils for roll-yaw adjustment compensated for fuel usage that would have been used in those axes, so there was an insignificant overall effect on fuel use throughout the life of the satellite. The Anik E2 satellite continued to provide full service for 14 years; two years longer than its design life of 12 years.

On March 26, 1996, another catastrophic failure occurred. A critical diode on Anik E1's solar panel shorted out, causing a permanent loss of half the satellite's power.

=== Anik F1 and F1R ===
Animation of Anik-F1R trajectory around Earth showing the Geostationary transfer orbit.

Anik F1 is a Canadian geosynchronous communications satellite that was launched on November 21, 2000, by an Ariane 4 rocket from the European Space Agency Centre Spatial Guyanais at Kourou. At the moment of its launch it was the most powerful communications satellite ever built. It has an advanced xenon ion thruster propulsion system and its communication "footprint" covers Central America as well as North America.

It was launched for Telesat Canada, a Canadian communications company. The primary customers are the Canadian Broadcasting Corporation, Shaw Direct, CHUM Limited and Canadian Satellite Communications Inc., and Bell Canada Enterprise Inc.

- Operator: Telesat Canada
- Manufacturer: Boeing Satellite Systems (formerly Hughes Aircraft Company) bus model Boeing 702
- Mass: 4710 kg (10,384 lb) at launch and 3015 kg (6647 lb) in orbit
- Dimensions: 40.4 m (132.5 feet) long and 9.0 m (29.5 feet) wide with the solar panels and antennas deployed
- DC power: 17.5 kW
- Expected lifetime: 15 years
- Transponders: 84 C-band and Ku-band
- Launch vehicle: Ariane 4

The solar panels of Anik F1 degraded more rapidly than expected, and a replacement Anik F1R was launched in 2005, with Anik F1 switching to serving only South America . Anik F1R also carries a GPS/WAAS payload in addition to the C-band and Ku-band transponders. The GPS /WAAS Payload was disabled on May 15, 2022, in concert with the activation of Galaxy XV.

=== Anik F2 ===
At 5,900 kilograms (13,000 lb), it is more than ten times the size of Anik A2 and is one of the largest, most powerful communications satellites ever built. Anik F2 is a Boeing 702-series satellite, designed to support and enhance current North American voice, data, and broadcast services with its C-Band and Ku-band technologies. It is the fifteenth satellite to be launched by Telesat Canada.

With its use of Ka band technology, low-cost two-way satellite delivery will be available for wireless Internet access connections, telehealth, distance education, remote work applications, and e-commerce in the most remote regions of Canada.

On October 6, 2011, starting around 06:30 EST a "technical" anomaly caused the satellite to point away from the Earth causing an outage in Internet, telephone and bank machine connectivity throughout much of Canada's northern areas. The outage also affected flights in the region. Some hospitals in Québec reported an outage in their communications systems as a result of the satellite outage. The anomaly was caused when the satellite did not respond well to a software update. As it failed, it turned away from the Earth and positioned itself towards the Sun in order to keep critical systems running. This was Anik F2's first outage. The event caused the Canadian military's research arm, Defence Research and Development Canada, to start considering satellites as critical infrastructure systems and to invest in research to develop innovations that will help protect Canadian satellites from failures.

On October 2, 2016, at approximately 17:00 EDT, another malfunction with Anik F2 resulted in a loss of Northwestel's long distance and cellular service, Xplornet and some of SSI Micro Internet, and some TV signals for Shaw Direct Satellite TV.

Anik F2 has lost two of its four thrusters. As a result, continued operation uses significantly more fuel. Telesat has announced that it is acquiring an in-orbit satellite to replace Anik F2. An FCC filing by Telesat has since revealed that the company is buying AMC-11 from SES. Once the FCC has issued its permit, Telesat can take over AMC-11 and move it to 111.1° West. It will be renamed Anik F4.

=== Anik F3 ===
According to SatNews Publishers, Anik F3 is a 4,634 kilograms (10,216 lb) broadcasting and telecommunications satellite which will provide direct-to-home television in the United States, broadband Internet and telecommunications for Bell Canada, and broadcast TV in northern and other remote areas of Canada. It was built by EADS Astrium and launched on a Proton-M rocket. It was successfully placed into orbit by International Launch Services, who also launched Anik F1R, Nimiq 1 and Nimiq 2.

However, previous to launch, it was announced that Dish would be leasing the entire capacity of Anik F3 for its entire estimated life of approximately 15 years. Today, Anik F3 is used by Dish to beam its "international" foreign language channel offerings. A slightly larger reflector provided by Dish to its customers is required to receive the weaker (as compared to the stronger Ku DBS band used by Dish and DirecTV as their primary satellites) Ku FSS band reliably. Also, Dish uses a specially designed "combo" LNB that houses both elements necessary to receive Dish services from both 118 and 119 taking the space of only a single LNB. The combo LNB is also available part of a single LNBF unit that can also receive additional Dish programming at 110 and 129 satellite locations for reception of Dish's entire Western Arc constellation of satellites providing both SD and HD content. Dish does not produce any 118 only LNBF's for its systems, only the combo 118/119 by itself or as part of a single unit that also receives other Dish satellites.

=== Anik G1 ===
Anik G1 was launched on April 16, 2013, by a Proton-M from Baikonur Cosmodrome for Telesat.

Anik G1 is a multi-mission satellite manufactured by Space Systems/Loral on its LS1300E platform. It has three payloads that provide direct-to-home (DTH) television service in Canada, as well as broadband, voice, data, and video services in South America where economic growth has driven high demand for satellite services. It is also the first commercial satellite with a substantial X-band payload, for government communications from 178˚W to 35˚W covering the Americas and the Pacific Ocean, including Hawaii. The satellite is positioned at 107.3° West longitude where it is co-located with Telesat's Anik F1 satellite, doubling both the C-band and Ku-band transponders serving South America.

The Anik G1 X-band capacity was leased to the operators of the United Kingdom Ministry of Defence Skynet system, helping Skynet expand to near global coverage.
