= Roland Robinson, 1st Baron Martonmere =

British Conservative politician (1907–1989)

The Right Honourable The Lord Martonmere GBE KCMG PC

Governor of Bermuda
- In office 1964–1972
- Monarch: Elizabeth II
- Preceded by: Sir Julian Gascoigne
- Succeeded by: Sir Richard Sharples

Member of Parliament for Blackpool South
- In office 5 July 1945 – 25 September 1964
- Preceded by: New constituency
- Succeeded by: Peter Blaker

Member of Parliament for Blackpool
- In office 14 November 1935 – 15 June 1945
- Preceded by: Clifford Erskine-Bolst
- Succeeded by: Constituency abolished

Member of Parliament for Widnes
- In office 27 October 1931 – 25 October 1935
- Preceded by: Alexander Gordon Cameron
- Succeeded by: Richard Pilkington

Personal details
- Born: John Roland Robinson; 22 February 1907
- Died: 3 May 1989 (aged 82) Lyford Cay, Nassau, Bahamas
- Party: Conservative
- Spouse: Maysie Gasque (after 1930)
- Relations: Edward S. Rogers III (grandson); John Stephen Robinson, 2nd Baron Martonmere (grandson)
- Children: 2, including Loretta Robinson
- Education: Trinity Hall, Cambridge

John Roland Robinson, 1st Baron Martonmere, GBE, KCMG, PC (22 February 1907 – 3 May 1989) was a British Conservative Party politician who was a Member of Parliament from 1931 to 1964. Subsequently, he served as Governor of Bermuda from 1964 to 1972.

== Early life ==
Robinson was born on 22 February 1907. He was the son of solicitor Roland Walkden Robinson of Blackpool and the former Mary Collier Pritchard, a daughter of Joseph Pritchard, also of Blackpool.

He was educated at Trinity Hall, Cambridge, and was called to the Bar at Lincoln's Inn in 1929.

== Career ==
Robinson was elected at the 1931 general election as Member of Parliament (MP) for Widnes, a seat he held until 1935, when he was elected for Blackpool. He held that seat until the constituency was divided at the 1945 election, when he was elected for Blackpool South, holding that seat until he retired from the House of Commons at the 1964 general election.

Robinson never held ministerial office, but he was Chairman of the Conservative Commonwealth Affairs Committee in the House of Commons from 1954 to 1964. He was knighted in 1954, and admitted in 1962 to the Privy Council.

In 1964, he was raised to the peerage as Baron Martonmere, of Blackpool in the County Palatine of Lancaster. During the latter year, he was also appointed as Governor of Bermuda, a post he held until 1972. He was further honoured when he was awarded a KCMG in 1966 and a GBE in 1973.

== Personal life ==
In 1930, Robinson was married to Maysie Gasque, daughter of Clarence Warren Gasque. After moving to Bermuda, they spent summers at Romay House in Tucker's Town and winters at Lyford Cay in Nassau, Bahamas. They had one son and one daughter:

- Richard Robinson (1935–1979), who married Wendy Patricia Blagden, a daughter of James Cecil Blagden of Bapchild Court, in 1959.
- Loretta Robinson (1939–2022), who married Edward S. Rogers Jr., a Canadian businessman who founded Rogers Communications, in 1963.

Robinson died at his home in Lyford Cay (Nassau, Bahamas) in May 1989, at the age of 82. He was succeeded in the Barony of Martonmere by his grandson, John Stephen Robinson (b. 1963).

=== Descendants ===
Through his daughter Loretta, he was a grandfather of Lisa Anne Rogers (adopted), Edward S. Rogers III, Melinda Mary Rogers, and Martha Loretta Rogers.

== Arms ==
Coat of arms of Roland Robinson, 1st Baron Martonmere
Crest A lion's head erased Or in the mouth a crescent Gules. Escutcheon Argent a three masted merchant ship of early eighteenth century date the mainsails furled Proper on a chief Azure a portcullis chained between two roses Or. Supporters Dexter a lion Or collared flory counterflory Gules sinister a stag Gules attired and unguled collared flory counterflory Or. Motto Integrity and understanding.

Parliament of the United Kingdom
Preceded by Alexander Gordon Cameron	Member of Parliament for Widnes; 1931–1935	Succeeded by Richard Pilkington
Preceded by Clifford Erskine-Bolst	Member of Parliament for Blackpool; 1935–1945	Constituency abolished
New constituency	Member of Parliament for Blackpool South; 1945–1964	Succeeded by Peter Blaker
Political offices
Preceded by Sir Julian Gascoigne	Governor of Bermuda; 1964–1972	Succeeded by Sir Richard Sharples
Peerage of the United Kingdom
New creation	Baron Martonmere; 1964–1989	Succeeded by John Stephen Robinson
