= Loretta Rogers =

Canadian philanthropist (1939–2022)

The Honourable Loretta Rogers
- Born: Loretta Anne Robinson; April 13, 1939; London, England
- Died: June 11, 2022 (aged 83); Toronto, Ontario, Canada
- Education: University of Miami (BFA)
- Occupation: Director of Rogers Communications
- Spouse: Ted Rogers (m. 1963; died 2008)
- Children: 4, including Edward Rogers III
- Parents: Roland Robinson, 1st Baron Martonmere (father); Maysie Gasque (mother)

Loretta Anne Rogers (née Robinson; April 13, 1939 – June 11, 2022) was an English-born Canadian businesswoman and philanthropist who was a director of Rogers Communications. She was the wife of Ted Rogers, the company's founding president and CEO. In 2015, Forbes estimated her net worth at US$5.5 billion.

== Early life and education ==
Rogers was born on April 13, 1939, in London, England. She was the younger child and only daughter of Roland Robinson, 1st Baron Martonmere, and wife Maysie Gasque (died 1989). Her father was a British Conservative Party politician who was granted the hereditary title of Baron Martonmere in 1964. He served as Governor of Bermuda from 1964 to 1972. Her mother, Maysie Gasque, was an American with ties to F. W. Woolworth Company through her uncle-in-law Hubert T. Parson, who served as Woolworth's president; thus making Gasque an heiress to the Woolworth fortune.

Rogers held a Bachelor of Fine Arts degree from the University of Miami. She has received honorary doctorates from the University of Western Ontario, Ryerson University, and the University of Toronto.

== Career ==
Rogers had served as a non-independent director of Rogers Communications Inc. since December 1979. She was also a director of Rogers Media Inc., Rogers Telecommunications Inc., Rogers Cable Inc., and Rogers Wireless Communications Inc.

=== Philanthropy ===
With her husband, Ted Rogers, she established the Loretta A. Rogers Chair in Eating Disorders at Toronto General & Western Hospital, part of the University Health Network, where she served on the foundation board from 2005, and where the Ted Rogers and Family Chair in Heart Function was established in 2009. This was complemented by the Ted Rogers Centre of Excellence in Heart Function in 2012.

== Personal life ==
She married Ted Rogers on September 25, 1963. Together, they had four children: Lisa, Edward, Melinda and Martha.

Rogers' only son, Edward Rogers III, is the chairman of Rogers Communications and the Rogers Control Trust, which controls the majority of the voting shares of Rogers Communications.

Her daughter Melinda Rogers-Hixson founded Rogers Venture Partners, the technology investment arm headquartered in San Francisco. She is the vice-chair of the Rogers Control Trust.

== Death ==
Rogers died at her home in Toronto on June 11, 2022, at the age of 83.
