= 1888 Toronto municipal election =

Municipal elections were held in Toronto, Canada, on January 2, 1888. Edward Frederick Clarke, a Member of the Legislative Assembly of Ontario, defeated Alderman Elias Rogers, owner of a prominent coal and home heating company, and Daniel Defoe, a barrister and former alderman.

Rogers, a Quaker, was viewed as the "temperance candidate for mayor" while Clarke was favoured by tavern and liquor store owners and anti-temperance voters. Clarke's victory, along with the defeat of two liquor bylaws being proposed by referendum, being seen as a victory for anti-temperance sentiment.

== Toronto mayor ==
Results
Edward Frederick Clarke - 7,951
Elias Rogers - 7,050
Daniel Defoe - 2,019

== Referendum ==
Referendums were held on three proposed by-laws, one to approve financing for a "trunk sewer", a second by-law to reduce the number of taverns licensed to serve liquor from 150 to 100, and a third to reduce the number of shops licensed to sell liquor from 50 to 20. All three by-laws were defeated.

Trunk sewer by-law
For - 2,825
Against - 3,737

Tavern licence by-law
For - 7,371
Against - 8,187

Shop licence by-law
For - 7,743
Against - 8,146

== Aldermen elected to city council ==
St. Andrew's Ward
E. King Dodds (incumbent) - 837
William Carlyle (incumbent) - 822
Thomas Pells - 769
William Burns - 699
J. D. Henderson - 633
James Bond - 519

St. David's Ward
John C. Swait (incumbent) - 1,255
William H. Gibbs - 1,179
Robert J. Fleming (incumbent) - 1,019
J. G. Gibson - 940
Wickett (incumbent) - 770

St. George's Ward
George E. Gillespie (incumbent) - acclaimed
John Maugham (incumbent) - acclaimed
George Verral (incumbent) - acclaimed

St. James' Ward
Alfred McDougall - 1,165
James B. Boustead (incumbent) - 1,017
John McMillan (incumbent) - 1,053
Wallace Millichamp (incumbent) - 774

St. John's Ward
H. L. Piper (incumbent) - 1,025
Irwin (incumbent) - 814
A. H. Gilbert - 679
Frank Moses - 642
R. J. Score - 622
James Thomson - 572

St. Lawrence Ward
Garrett F. Frankland (incumbent) - 733
John Hallam - 634
Morrison (incumbent) - 616
Charles Small - 561
Thomas Thompson - 399

St. Mark's Ward
John Ritchie (incumbent) - 456
Michael J. Woods (incumbent) - 401
Charles Frederick Denison (incumbent) - 410
David D. Christie - 286
James Roney - 245
Robert Brown - 95

St. Matthew's Ward
Jones (incumbent) - 371
Francis E. Galbraith - 308
Peter Macdonald - 295
Ernest A. Macdonald (incumbent) - 247
Ingham (incumbent) - 182
Thomas Foster - 29

St. Patrick's Ward
John Baxter (incumbent) - 1,966
Harvie (incumbent) - 1,467
George J. St. Leger (incumbent) - 1,214
Isaac Wardell - 1,187

St. Paul's Ward
W. J. Hill (incumbent) - acclamation
William Roaf - (incumbent) acclamation
John Shaw (incumbent) - acclamation

St. Stephen's Ward
Johnston (incumbent) - 1,178
William Bell - 1,079
Barton (incumbent) - 1,001
Robert H. Graham (incumbent) - 926
R. W. Prittie - 477

St. Thomas' Ward
William Carlyle (incumbent) - 892
Edward Hewitt - 691
Drayton (incumbent) - 655
Galley (incumbent) - 632
William Park - 375
