= Ian Angus (activist) =

Canadian socialist activist (born 1945)

Ian Angus (born 1945) is a Canadian ecosocialist activist, blues music radio host, and telecommunications analyst.

Angus is editor of the journal Climate & Capitalism, a frequent contributor to Monthly Review, and a founding executive member of the Global Ecosocialist Network.

From 1994 to 2007, he hosted blues music programs on CKLN-FM and CIUT-FM in Toronto. From 1997 to 2007 he was chair of the Nominating Panel for the Maple Blues Awards, Canada’s national blues awards program.

From 1980 until 2007, he was president of Angus TeleManagement Group, a consulting and education company specializing in telecommunications. He and his partner Lis Angus co-edited the monthly journal Telemanagement and the weekly newsletter Telecom Update. In 2005 they were inducted into Canada's Telecommunications Hall of Fame in the Advocates and Academics category.

== Publications ==
- Author of Metabolic Rifts: Capitalism's Assault on the Earth System (Monthly Review Press, 2026)
- Author of The War Against the Commons: Dispossession and Resistance in the Making of Capitalism (Monthly Review Press, 2023)
- Author of A Redder Shade of Green: Intersections of Science and Socialism (Monthly Review Press, 2017)
- Author of Facing the Anthropocene: Fossil Capitalism and the Crisis of the Earth System (Monthly Review Press, 2016)
- Co-author, with Simon Butler, Too Many People? Population, Immigration, and the Environmental Crisis (Haymarket Books, 2011)
- Editor of The Global Fight for Climate Justice: Anticapitalist Responses to Global Warming and Environmental Destruction (Resistance Books, 2009)
- Author of Canadian Bolsheviks: The Early Years of the Communist Party of Canada (Vanguard Publications 1981; Second edition Trafford Publishing, 2004)
