= Communications Technology Satellite =

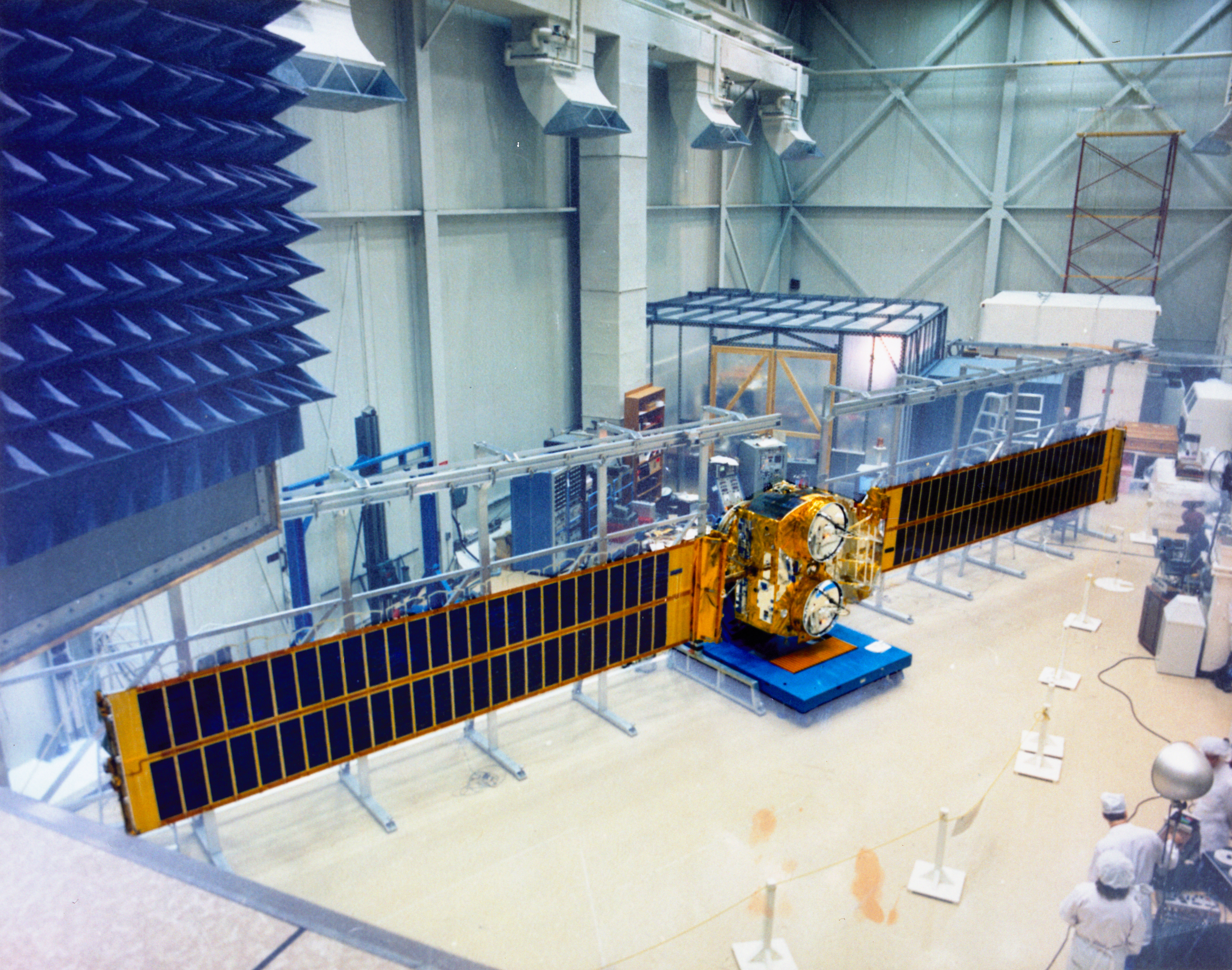
- Names: CTS; Hermes
- Mission type: Communications
- Operator: NASA
- COSPAR ID: 1976-004A
- SATCAT no.: 08585
- Mission duration: 2 years (planned); 3 years, 9 months (achieved)

Spacecraft properties
- Manufacturer: Communications Research Centre Canada
- Launch mass: 680 kg
- Power: 1200 watts

Start of mission
- Launch date: 17 January 1976, 23:28:00 UTC
- Rocket: Delta-2914 (D-119)
- Launch site: Cape Canaveral, LC-17B
- Contractor: McDonnell Douglas
- Entered service: 21 May 1976

End of mission
- Last contact: October 1979

Orbital parameters
- Reference system: Geocentric orbit
- Regime: Geosynchronous orbit
- Longitude: 116.0° West
- Epoch: 17 January 1976

Transponders
- Band: K_{u} band

The Communications Technology Satellite (CTS), known as Hermes, was an experimental high-power direct broadcast communications satellite. It was a joint effort of Canadian Department of Communications, who designed and built the satellite, NASA who tested, launched and operated the satellite, and European Space Agency (ESA) who provided the 1200 watts solar panels and other devices. The three agencies shared the satellite and the data from the experiments.

Although the launch of the ATS-6 spacecraft in 1974 marked the end of NASA's program of experimental communications satellites. NASA participated in a Canadian satellite venture known initially as "Cooperative Applications Satellite-C" and renamed Hermes. This joint effort involved NASA and the Canadian Department of Communications. NASA's Lewis Research Center provided the satellite's high-power communications payload. Canada designed and built the spacecraft; NASA tested, launched, and operated it. Also, the European Space Agency provided one of the low-power traveling-wave tubes and other equipment. Hermes was launched 17 January 1976 and operated until October 1979.

== Launch ==
It was launched on 17 January 1976, from Cape Canaveral in Florida by a Delta 2914 rocket. Designed for a two-year mission it was the basis of experiments past its intended lifetime until October 1979 when a system failure broke all contacts with it. Unlike most communications satellites of the period, which had spin-stabilized bodies covered with solar cells, the Hermes CTS was three-axis stabilized and had its solar panels spread out on two huge "wings".

== Satellite ==
The satellite was meant to test the practical aspects of a high powered satellite using large antennas beaming television signals directly to homes equipped with small antennas, and two-way communications with mobile stations. When it was launched it was the most powerful communications satellite in existence.

This three-axis stabilized satellite was designed as a test vehicle to carry communications-related equipment. The purpose of its launch into an equatorial, Earth-synchronous orbit was:

- to demonstrate new technology,
- to conduct communications technological experiments,
- to develop new communications methodology in conjunction with ground-based components.

The spacecraft was a short (1.17-m) right cylinder (1.8-m diameter) with two parallel (1.72-m apart) plane surfaces symmetrically truncating the curved surface. These plane surfaces were also parallel to the cylinder axis. Relatively long, narrow (1.3- by 6.5-m) solar arrays were extendable from mechanisms mounted on the parallel plane sides.

== Communications Experiments ==
- Super high frequency (12 and 14 GHz) - Transmitter Experiment Package (TEP): this communications experiment consisted of a 20-W low-power super high frequency (SHF) communications transponder, a 200-W high-power SHF transmitter package, an SHF beacon, and antenna subsystems. The purpose of this experiment was: 1) to evaluate technical performance of the components and 2) to evaluate overall technical operation of the system. Both types of tests were done over a 2-year period. Reference was sometimes made to the two different types of evaluation as two different experiments. Evaluation of the overall operation was then referred to as a "communication system" experiment.
- Solar Array Technology Experiment (SATE): this experiment was to study the mechanical, dynamic, and electrical properties of a new type of extendable solar array over an extended time period. The two 1.3- x 6.5-m arrays were unfolded from their packs by unfurling a supporting tube that was attached to the extremity of the array.
- Attitude Control System Experiment: this was a technology experiment to evaluate the dynamics of spacecraft mechanical flexibility on ACS (attitude control system) operation and to demonstrate that attitude control flight performance was in accordance with stability and control theory.
- Canadian Communications Experiments: this experiment involved investigation of practical techniques for use of the satellite communications systems being tested. It included communication techniques for use in medicine, education, community development and interaction, and data transmission. It also included development of compatible ground facilities. About 30 different experiments by over 20 different organizations have been approved by a joint working group, which approved and coordinated Canadian and American experiments for this satellite equipment.
- United States User Experiments: this experiment involved explanation of future possible uses of high-powered communications satellites. Experimentation by 13 different experimenters involved medicine, education, community services, special services, and communications technology.

The CTS satellite also made history as being the first communications satellite used for video art, by artist Keith Sonnier in 1977 for his 2-part piece titled "Send/Receive Satellite Network", in which video and character generator text and graphics were fed over the satellite between the East and West Coasts of the United States. This marked the first time that satellite communication technology was used for video art. NASA cooperated with Sonnier's project and provided a satellite uplink truck for access to the CTS satellite. The piece was produced in two parts, "Phase I", which was a critique of satellite technology and whether it would become accessible to the public rather than the commercial and military purposes for the technology at that time, using feeds sent over the satellite by the artist and other participants, and "Phase II", which featured excerpts of the feeds sent.

Several communities in the Canadian wilderness participated in a series of realistic tests of its capacities. Experiments in telemedicine for Emergency medical services, teleconferencing and community TV were conducted. The satellite was also used in May 1978 to televise Stanley Cup hockey playoffs to Canadian diplomats in Peru to demonstrate its international capacity. This was the first direct-to-home satellite television broadcast in the world. It covered about 40% of the Earth's surface, from its geostationary orbit. In Canada alone, 37 tests were done using a family of 27 ground terminals. The experiments led to the creation of the hybrid Anik B satellite which was both a standard Anik model and a platform for pilot projects of direct broadcast TV.

In 1987, Canada's Department of Communications and NASA received an Emmy Award for developing direct broadcast TV satellite technology with the Hermes CTS program.

== See also ==
- Timeline of artificial satellites and space probes
- Canadian Satellite Communications
