= Stationary High Altitude Relay Platform =

1980s beamed-power aircraft

SHARP, short for Stationary High Altitude Relay Platform, was an experimental aircraft using beam-powered propulsion designed by the Communications Research Centre Canada (CRC) and built by the University of Toronto Institute for Aerospace Studies (UTIAS) during the 1980s. SHARP used microwaves to provide energy from a ground station that powered electric motors spinning propellers to keep the aircraft aloft. The power was also used for the onboard electronics. SHARP could remain aloft indefinitely, and was intended to be used as a sort of low-altitude communications satellite for smaller geographical areas.

== History ==
=== Background ===
The concept of using beamed power for aircraft propulsion was invented almost single-handedly by William C. Brown. After joining Raytheon in the 1940s, Brown started work on improving their magnetron products. This led to the development of the crossed-field amplifier, a simple, reliable and highly efficient microwave amplifier. He later worked with colleagues to develop the rectenna, which receives microwaves (the (an)"tenna") and converts them directly to DC power (the "rect"ifier).

Brown now had a system that could convert input power to microwaves with up to 70% efficiency and convert it back to electric power with 70% efficiency, resulting in an overall efficiency of about 50%. Brown looked for applications of the technology, working on both solar power satellites (SPS) and the High Altitude Powered Platform (HAPP) concept. This research went as far as flying a model helicopter using beamed power in 1965.

NASA also invested in the rectenna concept as part of their SPS work. This was tested in a ground-to-ground experiment in 1975, and as part of this they developed lightweight versions of the rectenna. In 1982, Brown and James Trimer (of NASA) announced a new version of the rectenna using printed circuit techniques that reduced the weight by ten times. This made aircraft applications much more attractive.

=== Relay platform ===
In the era before narrow-angle broadcasting from communications satellites was possible, television broadcasters faced the problem of only having technology that was suitable for greater metropolitan areas on the order of 100 km using conventional ground-mounted antennas, or large portions of the continent using satellites. Addressing the range between these two extremes normally required a network of repeater antennas, which were expensive given the smaller populations they normally served.

Since a satellite was too high, and a terrestrial antenna too low, what was needed was a platform between the two, covering an area of a few hundred kilometers in radius – about the size of a Canadian province. To do this the platform would have to fly at about 70,000 feet (21 km) altitude. Aircraft and helicopters could do this, but only with short endurances. Super-high-altitude aerostats were another possibility. Of the available technologies, helicopters appeared to be too heavy, and aerostats, jokingly referred to as the "Gossamer Hindenberg", were not well understood. An electrically powered ultralight aircraft appeared to be the best solution. At the time, a system using solar cells and batteries was considered too heavy.

The economics of the system were attractive as a replacement for conventional satellites even in some large-area deployments. The CRC estimated the aircraft would cost about $100,000 each, and operate for $2 to $3 million a year. In contrast, just launching a satellite cost about $150 million. Additionally, whereas a satellite of the era might have a lifetime of about 10 years, the aircraft could be periodically returned to the ground for servicing and upgrades, allowing it to operate indefinitely. They felt this would be attractive to third world markets.

=== SHARP ===
Following the work of HAPP, the CRC started work on their own version with the specific intent of making a communications platform. SHARP would use an 80 m diameter array of small parabolic dishes beaming 500 kW of power to the aircraft at 5.8 GHz frequency. At altitude, the beam was focussed down to an area just larger than the aircraft. The aircraft normally flew in a circle about 2 km across, so the beam only needed to steer a few degrees.

In 1981 SED Systems was awarded a contract to study the power requirements of a communications platform, while John F. Martin of Martin Communications and James DeLaurier at UTIAS studied aircraft configurations. In September 1982 the Department of Communications gave the go-ahead to form a formal study group within the CRC, which studied rectenna design, leading to several patents on thin-film versions.

In 1982 UTIAS built a prototype of the aircraft with a 1.3 meter high aspect-ratio wing mounted just above the fuselage, and a conventional t-tail at the rear. This model was powered by a small gasoline engine and did not support a rectenna. The prototype demonstrated several aerodynamic problems, leading to an improved design that moved the horizontal stabilizer to the front of the aircraft into a canard configuration. This underwent wind tunnel testing at UTIAS during 1985 and 86.

All of these studies culminated in the go-ahead to build an eighth-scale model of the proposed production SHARP vehicle that would be powered by two small electric motors. Power for takeoff would be provided by batteries, until it gained enough altitude that it could acquire the microwave beam and self-power from that point on. The model, with a 4.5 meter wingspan, was built during 1987.

Its maiden flight at the CRC took place on 17 September 1987. The system worked as expected, allowing launch by the batteries and capture by the 1 kW broadcaster shortly after takeoff. The initial 20-minute flight time was extended to over an hour by 5 October, and on the 6th a public demonstration was made for the Minister of Communications, Flora MacDonald. Their work won the "Diplôme d'Honneur" from the Fédération Aéronautique Internationale in 1988.

=== After SHARP ===
In spite of its success, SHARP research ended as part of a larger draw-down of the Canadian research budgets. Ready for testing long-duration flights, field mice attacked the SHARP aircraft while it was in storage, and the flights never took place.

The work was picked up in Japan at the Radio Atmospheric Science Centre at Kyoto University. Starting immediately after the SHARP successes, Professor Hiroshi Matsumoto developed a similar vehicle, which flew on 29 August 1992.

Compared to SHARP, their MILAX (Microwave Lifted Airplane Experiment) vehicle had two new design features. The rectenna on the aircraft was embedded in the wings and tail surfaces, eliminating the need for the separate antenna body. The broadcast antenna was based on an active phased array, allowing it to steer without physical movement. The system was tested by mounting the broadcast antenna on the back of a light truck, and driving it around while MILAX followed.

Another beamed-power experiment in Japan was the ETHER project, which beamed 5.8 kW of power to a helium-inflated airship.

In the years since the system was first proposed, advances in solar cells and battery technology have upset the initial calculations. The NASA Pathfinder demonstrated long-duration solar powered flight in a role essentially identical to SHARP. In the 2000s, Titan Aerospace began development of such a vehicle specifically for the communications role, in this case as an internet relay.
