= John Robinson, 2nd Baron Martonmere =

British peer (born 1963)

The Right Honourable The Lord Martonmere

Member of the House of Lords
- Lord Temporal
- as a hereditary peer 3 May 1989 – 11 November 1999
- Preceded by: The 1st Baron Martonmere
- Succeeded by: Seat abolished (Note: Pursuant to the House of Lords Act 1999.)

Personal details
- Born: John Stephen Robinson; 12 July 1963 (age 62)
- Political party: Crossbench

John Stephen Robinson, 2nd Baron Martonmere (born 12 July 1963), is the current holder of the British peerage title of Baron Martonmere. This hereditary title was created in 1964 for his grandfather, the British Conservative Party politician Roland Robinson, who had served as a Member of Parliament and subsequently became Governor of Bermuda.

== Early life ==
He is the elder son of the Hon. Richard Anthony Gasque Robinson (1935–1979) and his wife, Wendy Patricia Blagden (1939–2023). He has two siblings, David Alan Robinson and Carolyn Elizabeth Robinson.

His paternal grandparents were Roland Robinson, 1st Baron Martonmere, and Maysie Gasque. His maternal grandfather was James Cecil Blagden of Bapchild Court in Sittingbourne, Kent.

He was educated at Lakefield College School near Lakefield, Ontario (which was also attended by the future King Felipe VI of Spain and Prince Andrew, Duke of York), and he subsequently studied at Seneca College in Toronto.

== Career ==
When his paternal grandfather died in 1989, he succeeded to the title as the 2nd Baron Martonmere, of Blackpool in the County Palatine of Lancaster. This is due to the fact that his father had died in 1979.

He was a member of the House of Lords until 1999, when all but 92 hereditary peers were expelled under the House of Lords Act 1999.

== Personal life ==
On 15 December 2001, Lord Martonmere married Marion Elizabeth Wills, daughter of Ian Malcolm Wills. Together, they are the parents of two sons:

- The Hon. James Ian Robinson (b. 2003)
- The Hon. Andrew Roland Robinson (b. 2005)

== Arms ==
Coat of arms of John Robinson, 2nd Baron Martonmere
Crest A lion's head erased Or in the mouth a crescent Gules. Escutcheon Argent a three masted merchant ship of early eighteenth century date the mainsails furled Proper on a chief Azure a portcullis chained between two roses Or. Supporters Dexter a lion Or collared flory counterflory Gules sinister a stag Gules attired and unguled collared flory counterflory Or. Motto Integrity and understanding.

== Notes ==
Peerage of the United Kingdom
Preceded by Roland Robinson	Baron Martonmere; 1989–present Member of the House of Lords (1989–1999)	Incumbent; Heir apparent: Hon. James Robinson
