= Donald Hings =

Canadian inventor

Donald Lewes Hings
- Born: November 6, 1907; Leicester, England
- Died: February 25, 2004 (aged 96); Burnaby, British Columbia
- Occupations: P.Eng. (Professional Engineer BC), MBE, Order of Canada
- Known for: Inventor of the "Walkie-Talkie", Klystron Magnetron sensor, Linear induction motor controller; Kaymir pulp digester refinements.

Donald Lewes Hings, CM MBE (November 6, 1907 – February 25, 2004) was a British-Canadian inventor, born in Leicester, England. In 1937 he created a portable radio signaling system for his employer CM&S, which he called a "packset", and was the first aircraft communications radio, but which later became known as the "Walkie-Talkie" for use on the ground.

While Hings was filing a U.S. patent for the aircraft packset in Spokane, Washington in 1939, Canada declared war on Germany. CM&S sent Hings to Ottawa to redevelop his new invention for military use, and he worked there from 1940 to 1945. During these years, he developed a number of models, including the successful C-58 Walkie-Talkie which eventually sold eighteen thousand units produced for infantry use, and for which he received the MBE in 1946 and the Order Of Canada in 2001.

Following the war, he moved to Burnaby, British Columbia, where he established an electronics R&D company, Electronic Labs of Canada. He continued researching and creating in the fields of communications and geophysics until his retirement. He held more than 55 patents in Canada and the United States, and was the inventor of the klystron magnetometer geological survey system. Hings' geophysical patents were issued for his invention and development of a practical technology for locating and plotting geophysical faults likely to host large deep pools of abiogenic hydrocarbons. Seventeen of his patents were issued on the basis of his geophysical methods. In 2006, Hings was inducted into the Telecommunications Hall of Fame.

Born in Leicester, England, he moved to Canada with his mother when he was three. Married with four children. He died on Capitol Hill, Burnaby, in 2004.
