= Communications Research Centre Canada =

Government wireless technologies laboratory

Coordinates: 45.3463°N 75.8841°W

- Centre de recherches sur les communications Canada

Agency overview
- Formed: 1969
- Jurisdiction: Government of Canada
- Headquarters: Ottawa, Ontario
- Minister responsible: Melanie Joly, Minister of Industry
- Agency executive: Marc Levesque, President
- Website: www.crc.gc.ca

The Communications Research Centre Canada (CRC; French: Centre de recherches sur les communications Canada) is a Canadian government scientific laboratory for research and development in wireless technologies, with a particular focus on the efficient use of radio frequency spectrum. Its mission is as follows:

- To perform wireless telecommunications research and development (R&D) that advances the efficient use of the radio spectrum, and serves as the government's leading source of scientific knowledge and technical advice for spectrum management, regulation and policy purposes;
- To support critical wireless telecommunications operational requirements of Government of Canada departments and agencies, such as National Defence and Public Safety;
- To take part in strategic R&D collaborations that leverage CRC's activities, resulting in knowledge and technology transfer that benefit Canadian industry, the economy and Canadians.

== History ==
Officially established in 1969, the CRC's roots can be traced back to the late 1940s and the Canadian Defence Research Board (DRB). The Defence Research Telecommunications Establishment (DRTE) existed from 1951 to 1969 within the DRB. In 1969, the federal government established a Department of Communications. The DRTE in its entirety was transferred to the new department's research branch, and renamed the Communications Research Centre. The CRC came under Industry Canada's wing in 1994. Throughout its history, the CRC has made significant contributions to the information and communications technology sector in Canada and abroad.

== Achievements ==
The CRC contributed to many "firsts" in Canadian communications, a number of which involved satellite communications. In 1962 the then-DRTE launched Alouette 1, Canada's first satellite. This led to the development of Canada's own communications satellite program. In 1976 the HERMES satellite was launched. It was the first high-powered satellite and the first to operate at the higher frequency Ku-band. In 1978, CRC offered the world's first direct-to-home satellite television broadcast via Hermes - a Stanley Cup hockey game. Later that year, the CRC gave a public demonstration of Telidon, the Canadian videotex/teletext system that contributed to the development of international standards for the Web. In 1983, CRC set up the first permanent Canadian governmental connection to the Internet, via an ARPANET connection (the first full international connection to the USENET portion of the then-Internet being the set up in 1981 by Henry Spencer at the University of Toronto). In the 1980s, the CRC funded and led the development of SHARP, which in 1987 became the world's first microwave-powered aircraft to fly. The CRC is responsible for many other firsts that have impacted Canadian telecommunications: in wireless systems; radio fundamentals, e.g., Software Defined Radio; communication networks; photonics and interactive multimedia.

Recognition of the CRC's contributions include the 1993 designation of the Alouette-ISIS Program as one of the 10 most outstanding achievements in the first 100 years of engineering in Canada. In 2007, the Alouette 1 Satellite Program was designated a National Historic Event. In 1995, the Canadian Aeronautics and Space Institute awarded CRC's SARSAT team, headed by Dr. A. Winter, Mr. H. Werstiuk and Dr. B. Blevis, the first ever Alouette Award for contributions in advancing search and rescue technology. The CRC has won three Emmy Awards: one in 1987 for its role in developing the Ku-band technology of the HERMES satellite; another awarded in 2009 for its contribution to standardizing the ATSC Digital Television System; and a third presented in 2012 for its role in standardizing loudness metering for use in broadcast audio. CRC's research and development in telecommunications also earned it the 2007 Special Recognition Award from Canada's Telecommunication Hall of Fame.
