= Telecommunications Hall of Fame =

Canada's Telecommunications Hall of Fame was a Canadian not-for-profit foundation that sought to foster a greater awareness of Canada's role in developing and innovating telecommunications. The foundation began operating in 2005 and had two main programs - an education and outreach program, and a laureate program, which honours historically important figures in the field.

Their stated mission was "To celebrate and honour the career achievements of those who have contributed significantly to the proud legacy of Canadian Telecommunications through our Telecom Laureates Program, and to advance education and public awareness of Canada's telecommunications history and heritage through our Education and Outreach program."

Laureates were inducted annually at the Telecom Laureate Awards ceremonies and Gala Dinners. The operation and funding of the Hall of Fame was the work of two non-profit corporations, including a federally-registered charitable foundation. The federal foundation was dissolved in 2016, although a non-profit corporation registered in the province of Ontario remains active. The last Gala Awards event was held in 2011.

Canada's Telecommunications Hall of Fame Laureates include:

- Alexander Graham Bell
- Reginald Aubrey Fessenden
- John H. Chapman
- David Colville
- Charles Fleetford Sise
- Sir Terence Matthews
- Professor Hudson Janisch
- Lis and Ian Angus
- Donald Hings
- Edward S. Rogers Sr.
- Francis Dagger
- Leila Wightman
- Edward Samuel Rogers (Ted Rogers)
- Ernest E. "Ernie" Saunders
- Nortel,
- Communications Research Centre,
- Robert W. (Bob) Jones
- Michael Kedar
- Don Chisholm
- Colin Franklin
