= Edward S. Rogers III =

Canadian businessman (born 1969)

- Born: Edward Samuel Rogers III; June 22, 1969 (age 57); Toronto, Ontario, Canada
- Education: University of Western Ontario (BA)
- Occupation: Businessman
- Board member of: Rogers Communications; Maple Leaf Sports & Entertainment; CableLabs; Economic Council of Canada
- Spouse: Suzanne Kolev (m. 2006)
- Children: 3
- Parents: Ted Rogers (father); Loretta Robinson (mother)
- Relatives: Edward Rogers Sr. (grandfather)

Edward Samuel Rogers III (born June 22, 1969) is a Canadian businessman who serves as the Executive Chair of Rogers Communications. He is also the Chair of the Rogers Control Trust, and in that capacity, he controls the 97.52% of voting shares of Rogers Communications the trust owns.

== Early life and family ==
Like his father and grandfather, Rogers attended Upper Canada College in Toronto. He subsequently attended the University of Western Ontario and graduated with a Bachelor of Arts degree. Rogers then worked for Comcast Corporation in the Philadelphia area from 1992 to 1994 before returning to Canada to work at his family's company.

Rogers and his wife Suzanne have three children – Chloé, Edward IV and Jack – and they live in Toronto. He is a descendant of Timothy Rogers (1756–1834), a Quaker leader who founded Newmarket and Pickering in what is now Ontario.

== Career ==
Rogers is the Executive Chair of the board of directors of Rogers Communications Inc. and also Chair of its Finance Committee, Nominating Committee, and Executive Committee. He is also Chair of the Rogers Bank, Toronto Blue Jays baseball club, Maple Leaf Sports & Entertainment and Constantine Enterprises. Rogers is a past director of the Hospital for Sick Children Foundation and since 2019, has been an active member of the Scarborough Health Network (SHN), serving as the Honorary Co-Chair of its fundraising campaign, “Love, Scarborough."

From March 1996 until November 1998, Rogers was vice president and general manager of paging, data and emerging technologies for Rogers Wireless. His accomplishments at Rogers Wireless included increasing the profitability of the paging division and the launch of wireless data. Prior to that, he served as Director of Sales for Rogers Cable Inc., where he was responsible for retail, audit sales and sales administration.

From November 1998 until September 2000, he was the vice president and general manager of the Toronto region, representing 850,000 customers for Rogers Cable Inc. In this capacity, he was responsible for financial performance, sales performance and customer satisfaction. His responsibilities included sales, marketing, customer communications, call centre operations and technical operations.

From October 2000 until December 2002, he was Senior Vice President, Planning and Strategy, for Rogers Communications Inc. In this capacity, he was responsible for directing and co-ordinating strategic planning and budgeting.

From January 2003 to September 2009, he was President and Chief Executive Officer of Rogers Cable Inc., which consists of three business units. Rogers Cable is Canada's largest cable company offering cable television, high-speed Internet access and residential telephony services. Rogers Business Solutions division is a national provider of voice communications services, data networking and broadband Internet connectivity to small, medium and large businesses across the country. Rogers Retail is one of the largest retail chains in Canada with more than 475 stores. In 2009, Rogers Cable generated over $3.8 billion in revenue, over $1.3 billion in EBITDA and had over 14,000 employees.

Under his leadership, Rogers Cable's EBITDA more than doubled. Free cash flow saw an over $800M improvement and in 2009 the company produced nearly $500M in free cash flow. At the end of his tenure, Rogers Cable led the Canadian cable industry in RGU penetration and ARPU per customer.

On October 21, 2021, Rogers was removed as chairman of Rogers Communications Inc in response to news of his intention to replace five RCI directors. On October 22, Rogers announced the replacement of the five directors by way of written resolution. The newly reconstituted Rogers Communications board met on October 24, 2021 and reinstated Rogers as chairman.

On October 26, 2021 Rogers filed a petition with the British Columbia Supreme Court to confirm the legality of reconstituting the board through a written resolution. On November 5, 2021, Justice Shelley Fitzpatrick ruled Rogers actions "valid and enforceable".

In August 2024, Rogers was named executive chair of Rogers Communications following a unanimous vote by the board.

In 2023, Rogers oversaw the closing of Rogers Communications’ $20-billion acquisition of Shaw Communications, which to date is the largest telecommunications merger in Canadian history.

In July, 2025 it was announced that Rogers Communications, under Rogers' leadership, had doubled their stake in Maple Leaf Sports and Entertainment (MLSE) bringing it to 75% ownership and creating the world's fifth largest professional sports ownership group in doing so.

== Recognition ==
On October 15, 2026, Rogers received Toronto Metropolitan University's highest honour, an honorary Doctor of Laws degree (honoris causa), recognizing his contributions to the university as well as his philanthropic and business leadership.

On February 17, 2026, Ontario's Lieutenant Governor, the Honourable Edith Dumont, announced Edward Rogers' appointment to the Order of Ontario. Rogers was recognized as, "a prominent corporate strategist", "with bold vision" and having "expanded nationwide connectivity, championed digital inclusion and advanced major innovations." It was also noted that "his philanthropic leadership in healthcare underscores a profound commitment to equity, opportunity and enduring social impact". The Order of Ontario is the province’s highest civilian honour. It is awarded to Ontarians who have shown the highest level of excellence and achievement in their field, and whose impact has left a legacy.

Edward Rogers was named the Canadian Chamber of Commerce's 2025 Business Leader of the Year. The award recognizes his "vision, strategic leadership, and resilience" in ensuring Canada remains a top destination for business, according to the Canadian Chamber of Commerce.

On June 20, 2025, Rogers was awarded with the King Charles III Coronation Medal in recognition of his philanthropic and community contributions to Canada.

Rogers served on the Economic Council of Canada from 2010 to 2013, providing insight into the federal budget and the state of the economy.

He received the Queen Elizabeth II Diamond Jubilee Medal, in 2012, in recognition of contributions made to Canada.
