= Star Channel (Canada) =

Canadian premium TV channel

- Country: Canada
- Broadcast area: Atlantic Canada
- Headquarters: Halifax, Nova Scotia

Programming
- Language: English
- Picture format: 480i

Ownership
- Owner: Star Channel Services Ltd.

History
- Launched: February 1, 1983
- Closed: November 27, 1983

Star Channel was a premium pay television specialty channel available in four provinces in Atlantic Canada between February 1 and November 27, 1983. It was one of several regional pay-TV services authorized by the Canadian Radio-television and Telecommunications Commission to co-exist with the national service First Choice. While Star Channel was competitive with First Choice in obtaining subscribers for most of its life, the nascent industry struggled financially, and high installation costs stunted subscriber growth in the company's home city of Halifax, Nova Scotia.

== History ==
Star Channel Services Ltd. of Halifax, Nova Scotia, a company consisting of seven shareholders from four Atlantic Canadian provinces, applied to the Canadian Radio-television and Telecommunications Commission (CRTC) in 1981 seeking a licence to broadcast pay television programs to New Brunswick, Newfoundland and Labrador, Nova Scotia, and Prince Edward Island. It was one of 15 such applicants across the country. Star Channel was granted its licence on March 18, 1982, and would co-exist with First Choice, the national pay-TV licensee. It committed $1 million to spending on regional productions so as to have locally produced programs on its lineup, though most of its programs were to consist of Hollywood feature films.

Star Channel began broadcasting at 12:01 a.m. Atlantic Time on February 1, 1983, and was thus the first pay-TV channel in Canada. Alongside Star Channel, First Choice and the other regional pay-TV services launched on the same date. These included Superchannel, which held separate licences to operate in Ontario and Alberta. The regionals were more successful than First Choice at signing up customers. By August, Star Channel had applied to offer its service in Quebec, which was unserved by any English-language regional pay TV outlet. First Choice strenuously objected to Star Channel's efforts, accusing the channel and the other regionals of being "disguised national" services and hoping to avoid a repeat of the CRTC's authorization to let Superchannel broadcast into Manitoba and Saskatchewan.

Though Star Channel had been slightly outpacing First Choice in subscriptions, with some 14,500 by October, it had comparatively high fixed costs. The channel spent $5 per subscriber on satellite time compared with 68 cents for Superchannel Ontario. It also underperformed in the largest city in its service area, with only 1,000 subscribers in Halifax. This was because Halifax Cablevision charged as much as $200 to connect subscribers to pay services, much higher than the $35 charged by cable providers in most of the rest of the country.

The brawling and financial problems in the industry led the CRTC, in October, to designate a November 29 public hearing on pay TV. Days later, Star Channel filed for approval to either temporarily simulcast Superchannel's programming until it could improve its financial position or serve as a sales agent for Superchannel, which broadcast on the same spot beam to eastern Canada as Star Channel. To calm nervous subscribers, Star Channel president Finlay Macdonald turned a weekly viewer feedback show he hosted into an hour-long update on the firm's attempts to remain on the air. Unable to simulcast Superchannel, Star Channel ceased showing new movies and discontinued its program guide. The decision to not air new films caused subscriptions to start to decline. Days before the hearing, at 7 p.m. on November 27, Star Channel ceased broadcasting. Cable operators had three hours' warning of the channel's decision to stop providing programs. Macdonald told viewers, "In order to preserve our capital and not erode the subscriber base, we decided the best thing we could do was go off the air for a while to regroup." First Choice was offered to viewers in St. John's, Newfoundland, as a replacement. Cable operators in New Brunswick, Nova Scotia, and Prince Edward Island immediately began providing Superchannel Ontario to their subscribers, even though they technically were not authorized to do so, some defending the move as necessary in order to comply with conditions of their own licences requiring them to broadcast multiple pay-TV services. The CRTC urged the systems to stop pirating Superchannel. Star Channel was placed into receivership by Superchannel, news that was talked about at the opening day of the previously scheduled CRTC hearings. The CRTC held off on ruling on the channel's future until it could determine who owned Star Channel Services Ltd., with two receivers fighting for control of the firm—one backed by Superchannel and the other by TD Bank.

In May 1984, a new Star Channel firm was set up to hold the licence and compete with other parties that were expected to seek it in a CRTC call for applications. The new Star engaged in joint research with First Choice as to possible ways to differentiate the programming of the two services. Star Channel proposed an 8-hour broadcast day and expansion into Quebec. Superchannel, which at this point was providing pay-TV programs in Ontario and all provinces to the west, also bid on the licence. First Choice objected to Superchannel becoming a de facto national competitor without the burdensome obligation of maintaining a French-language service. Star Channel reformulated its application to specify a family-oriented service, similar to the Disney Channel in the United States and supplied with many of its programs, available in Ontario, Quebec, and Atlantic Canada. Disney Channel had previously failed to be authorized for distribution in Canada because the CRTC deemed it a pay channel and not a specialty channel, and it did not meet the CRTC's requirements of 30% Canadian programming and 80% ownership. By May, First Choice and Superchannel were in merger talks, and both disapproved of the Star Channel family proposal. In a deal finalized in early June, they proposed to split the country, with First Choice servicing Ontario and points eastward and Superchannel the west, and both offering a jointly operated family service. This angered Macdonald, who was flattered by their decision to lift many ideas of the Star Channel revival proposal but "angry that we've been ignored" in the merger process. The company asked for this application to be rescinded in January 1985; though no reason was given, the move came after new prime minister Brian Mulroney appointed Macdonald a senator in December 1984 and the CRTC named him a member of a task force on satellite broadcasting to rural Canada.
