= TSC (TV channel) =

Canadian TV shopping channel

- Country: Canada
- Broadcast area: National
- Headquarters: Mississauga, Ontario

Programming
- Picture format: 1080i HDTV (downscaled to letterboxed 480i for the SDTV feed)

Ownership
- Owner: Rogers Sports & Media
- Sister channels: Bravo; Citytv

History
- Launched: January 1, 1987; 39 years ago
- Former names: Canadian Home Shopping Network (1987–2000); The Shopping Channel (2000–2017)

Links
- Website: TSC.ca

Availability

Streaming media
- TSC Website: Live Stream

TSC (formerly The Shopping Channel) is a Canadian discretionary service channel owned by the Rogers Sports & Media subsidiary of Rogers Communications. The channel showcases various products which viewers can purchase either by telephone or internet.

As with most home shopping channels, the products are mainly aimed at a female audience, though some products target males as well. Products include those from such categories as fashion, beauty, home and garden, and electronics.

== History ==
Founded by Canadian entrepreneur John Goldberg, the channel went on the air on January 15, 1987 as the Canadian Home Shopping Network (CHSN), under the umbrella of the Canadian Home Shopping Club (CHSC), and was affiliated with the U.S. Home Shopping Network (HSN). The channel was exempted from licensing by the Canadian Radio-television and Telecommunications Commission (CRTC), but for several years this was on the condition the channel not use live motion video to demonstrate its products. Animated graphics could be used, but otherwise CHSN was limited to a slide-show format with voice-overs. This restriction was lifted in 1995.

The first on-air host was Sandi Hall. Hosts from the first year included "Bargain" Bill Allison (husband to Betty-Jean Allison, also a former host), Mike Banks, Craig Hamilton (Stash Cairo), Alexandra Elliot (Martha Zidel) and Rosemary Frasier, Hugh Wilson, and Steve Oatway. In January 1988, Rogers Communications acquired the organization from John Goldberg. Rogers then installed Simon Dean as the new president.

The Canadian Home Shopping Network was renamed to The Shopping Channel (TSC) in 2000.

After adopting its current name, the channel commonly used the acronym "TSC", which had a stylized askew-square logo. Its use was cut back significantly after complaints from the hardware store chain Tractor Supply Company, which used a vaguely similar logo.

In July 2011, TSC launched a high definition feed simulcasting the standard definition feed.

In July 2015, it was reported that Rogers was planning to sell The Shopping Channel, and had received bids from foreign broadcasters, such as Liberty Interactive (owner of QVC). Interest had also reportedly been shown by HSN and Evine Live. The network could fetch at least $300 million, although due to CRTC policies, a foreign company would not be able to serve as majority-owner.

In May 2017, the channel introduced a new logo and tagline, "Today's Shopping Choice".

== Products ==
TSC also has several businesses and products associated with and integrated with the television channel.

- E-commerce website - the channel operates tsc.ca, its online store which sells products that are currently featured on the channel in addition to exclusive products and products that have previously been advertised on the channel.
- Credit card - a branded TSC Credit Card
- Outlet store - previously, the channel owned an off-air outlet store in Toronto, Ontario; however, it has since been closed.

== Christmas programming ==
The only time that TSC does not broadcast live or tape-delayed product demonstrations is on Christmas Eve and Christmas Day. Sale broadcasts were replaced by Christmas scenes with holiday music in the background until 2008, but have been replaced since with TSC on-air personalities and celebrity guests sharing their Christmas memories. TSC usually ends live broadcasting for the Christmas holiday at about 4:00pm EST Christmas Eve, with taped sales segments airing from 4:00pm – 10:00pm EST. They go back to regular broadcasting at 10:00pm EST Christmas Day, with taped sales segments, and return to live broadcasting at 7:00am EST Boxing Day.
