= Baron Martonmere =

Barony in the Peerage of the United Kingdom

Baron Martonmere, of Blackpool in the County Palatine of Lancaster, is a title in the Peerage of the United Kingdom. It was created in 1964 for Sir Roland Robinson, a Conservative Party politician who subsequently served as Governor of Bermuda.

Since May 1989, the title has been held by the first Baron's grandson, John Stephen Robinson, 2nd Baron Martonmere. He is the elder son of the Hon. Richard Anthony Gasque Robinson (1935–1979), only son of the first Baron.

== Barons Martonmere (1964) ==
- (John) Roland Robinson, 1st Baron Martonmere (1907–1989)
  - The Hon. Richard Anthony Gasque Robinson (1935–1979), only son of the 1st Baron
- John Stephen Robinson, 2nd Baron Martonmere (b. 1963), eldest son of the above

The heir apparent is the present holder's elder son, the Hon. James Ian Robinson (b. 2003)

=== Line of Succession ===
- (John) Roland Robinson, 1st Baron Martonmere (1907–1989)
  - The Hon. Richard Anthony Gasque Robinson (1935–1979)
    - John Stephen Robinson, 2nd Baron Martonmere (b. 1963)
      - (1) The Hon. James Ian Robinson (b. 2003)
      - (2) The Hon. Andrew Roland Robinson (b. 2005)
    - (3) David Alan Robinson (b. 1965)

== Arms ==
Coat of arms of Baron Martonmere
Crest A lion's head erased Or in the mouth a crescent Gules. Escutcheon Argent a three masted merchant ship of early eighteenth century date the mainsails furled Proper on a chief Azure a portcullis chained between two roses Or. Supporters Dexter a lion Or collared flory counterflory Gules sinister a stag Gules attired and unguled collared flory counterflory Or. Motto Integrity and understanding.
