= Edward S. Rogers Sr. =

Canadian businessman (1900–1939)

- Born: Edward Samuel Rogers; June 21, 1900; Toronto, Ontario, Canada
- Died: May 6, 1939 (aged 38); Toronto, Ontario, Canada
- Resting place: Mount Pleasant Cemetery, Toronto
- Known for: Rogers batteryless radio
- Spouse: Velma Melissa Taylor (m. 1930)
- Children: Edward S. Rogers Jr.

Edward Samuel Rogers Sr. (June 21, 1900 – May 6, 1939) was a Canadian inventor and pioneer in the radio industry who founded the Rogers Vacuum Tube Company and the CFRB radio station in Toronto, Ontario. His only child, Edward S. Rogers Jr., established Rogers Communications.

== Early life and family ==
Rogers was born on June 21, 1900, in Toronto, Ontario. During his childhood, his family lived at 49 Nanton Avenue in the Rosedale neighbourhood of Toronto.

His father, businessman Albert Stephen Rogers (1860–1932), was a director of Imperial Oil (after his Queen City Oil Company was bought out) and formerly a partner in Samuel and Elias Rogers Coal Company (later Elias Rogers and Company). The coal firm had been founded in 1876 by his Quaker father, Samuel Rogers, and uncle Elias Rogers. The latter served as a Toronto alderman for St. Lawrence Ward in 1887.

The family descends from Timothy Rogers (1756–1834), a Quaker leader who established Newmarket and Pickering in what is now the province of Ontario.

== Career ==
Rogers first became interested in radio when he saw a receiver at age 11. By 1913, he was noted in local newspapers for his skill at operating a radio station, which at the time was an impressive technical accomplishment. Rogers worked as a radio officer on Great Lakes passenger ships during the summers of 1916-1919 inclusive. He graduated from the University of Toronto Schools in 1919. Two years later, Rogers operated the only Canadian (and only spark-gap) station to successfully compete in the first amateur trans-Atlantic radio competition. Rogers held the amateur radio call sign 3BP, and joined the Canadian chapter of the American Radio Relay League in 1921.

In the early 1920s, radio transmitters and receivers ran on large and expensive batteries to provide the high voltages needed for the vacuum tubes used. Early attempts at producing a radio receiver to operate on household alternating current were unsuccessful, since tubes designed for the low current supply from batteries were unsatisfactory when operated on 25- or 60-hertz alternating current. The batteries were also extremely large and bulky.

In April 1924, Rogers travelled to the United States and saw experimental AC receiving tubes at the laboratories of Westinghouse in Pittsburgh. He purchased the patent rights to the experimental alternating current tubes of Frederick S. McCullough. After further development, Rogers produced a design of vacuum tube that would operate on alternating current.

By 1925, Rogers had introduced not only a complete radio receiver using the new tubes, but had also produced a "battery eliminator" (power supply) that could be used with other manufacturers' receivers to eliminate the expensive batteries. By August 1925, the Rogers batteryless radio was in commercial sales, the first radio receiver in the world to operate from household current. At a time when a schoolteacher might earn $1,000 per year, the top-of-the-line Rogers radio sold for $370. Rogers formed the company "Standard Radio Manufacturing" (later Rogers Vacuum Tube Company) to produce radio receivers using the new design of vacuum tubes.

In 1927, Rogers founded CFRB ("Canada's First Rogers Batteryless") radio station. The station is owned today by Bell Media.

== Marriage and death ==
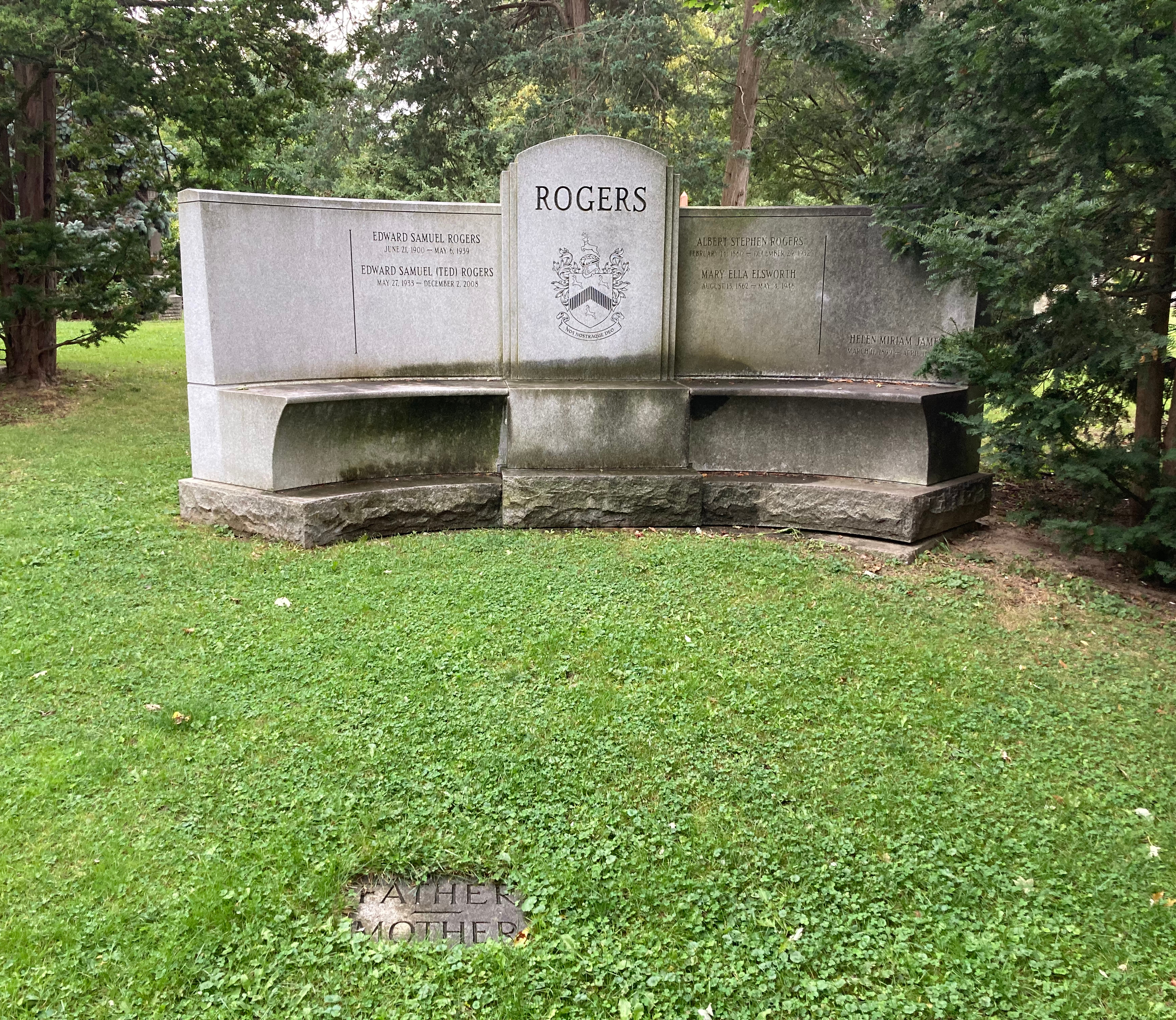
Rogers' grave at Mount Pleasant Cemetery

In 1930, Rogers married Velma Melissa Taylor. Three years later, they had a son, Edward S. Rogers Jr., who grew up to build Rogers Communications into a media conglomerate.

Rogers died suddenly in 1939 due to complications of a hemorrhage. He was buried in Mount Pleasant Cemetery, Toronto. Velma Rogers subsequently married John Graham, a Toronto lawyer, who became the stepfather of Edward Rogers Jr.

== Honours and awards ==
Rogers was posthumously inducted into the Canadian Broadcast Hall of Fame in 1982 and the Telecommunications Hall of Fame alongside his son in 2006. In 2000, Rogers and the "batteryless radio" were included as one of the Canada Post millennium stamps.

== Relatives ==
Members of Rogers' family included:

- Albert Stephen Rogers (1860–1932): Rogers' father; a prominent businessman who also served as chairman of Rogers Majestic.
- Joseph Elsworth Rogers (1898–1960): Rogers' brother; served as vice-president of Rogers Majestic until 1939, then as head from 1939 to 1960.
- Samuel Rogers (1835–1903): father of Albert Stephen Rogers; partner in coal business with Elias Rogers, then founded the Samuel Rogers Queen City Oil Works, which became the Queen City Oil Company and was later amalgamated with Imperial Oil.
- Elias Rogers (1850–1920): youngest brother of Samuel Rogers; partner with Samuel in coal business, which subsequently became Elias Rogers and Company.
- Alfred Selby Rogers (1874–1953): nephew of Samuel Rogers and only surviving son of Elias Rogers; inherited the coal business from his father.
- Elias Rogers Sr. (1806–1850): father of Samuel and Elias Rogers (inter alios), and son of Asa and Mary Rogers.
- Timothy Rogers (1756–1834): a Quaker leader whose daughter Mary (1782–1809) married Asa Rogers (1781–1834); their eldest son was Elias Rogers Sr.
