= Edward S. Rogers Jr. =

Canadian businessman and philanthropist (1933-2008)

Ted Rogers OC
- Born: Edward Samuel Rogers Jr. May 27, 1933; Toronto, Ontario, Canada
- Died: December 2, 2008 (aged 75); Toronto, Ontario, Canada
- Resting place: Mount Pleasant Cemetery, Toronto
- Education: Upper Canada College (1951); University of Toronto (BA, 1956); Osgoode Hall Law School (LLB, 1961)
- Title: President and CEO of Rogers Communications
- Term: 1967–2008
- Spouse: Loretta Robinson (m. 1963)
- Children: Lisa Anne Rogers; Edward S. Rogers III; Melinda Mary Rogers; Martha Loretta Rogers
- Parents: Edward S. Rogers Sr. (father); Velma Melissa Taylor (mother)
- Relatives: Timothy Rogers

Edward Samuel "Ted" Rogers Jr., OC (May 27, 1933 – December 2, 2008) was a Canadian businessman and philanthropist who served as the president and CEO of Rogers Communications. He was the fifth-richest person in Canada in terms of net worth.

== Life and career ==
Rogers was born in Toronto, Ontario, the son of Velma Melissa (Taylor) and radio pioneer and inventor Edward S. Rogers Sr. He was educated at Upper Canada College. He subsequently attended Trinity College in the University of Toronto, graduating in 1956 with a Bachelor of Arts degree. When he was an undergraduate student, Rogers joined the Sigma Chi fraternity. In 1979, he was named a Significant Sig by the fraternity – the 21st Canadian to be inducted.

In 1960, while still a student at Osgoode Hall Law School, he bought all the shares in local radio station CHFI, which pioneered the use of FM at a time when only 5% of the Toronto households had FM receivers. By 1965, he was in the cable TV business. Rogers Communications was established in 1967 and grew into one of Canada's largest media conglomerates. His father, Edward S. Rogers Sr., is regarded as the founder of the company, although the radio station that he established, CFRB, is now owned by another Canadian company and competitor, Bell Media.

Rogers had been the owner of the Toronto Blue Jays Major League Baseball team since September 1, 2000, when Rogers Communications Inc. purchased 80% of the baseball club, with the Labatt Brewing Company maintaining a 20% interest and the Canadian Imperial Bank of Commerce relinquishing its 10% share. He purchased the remaining 20% share from Labatt in 2003, and owned the team in full until his death. Moreover, the Blue Jays' home ballpark, SkyDome, was renamed Rogers Centre in 2005 after Rogers' firm purchased the stadium (including naming rights).

== Marriage and family ==
On September 25, 1963, Rogers married Loretta Anne Robinson. Her father was Roland Robinson, 1st Baron Martonmere, who was a British politician and later served as Governor of Bermuda. Rogers and his wife had four children together: Lisa, Edward, Melinda and Martha. He was a direct descendant of Timothy Rogers (1756–1834), a Quaker leader who founded Newmarket and Pickering in what is now Ontario.

== Honours and awards ==
On October 25, 1990, Rogers was appointed to the grade of Officer of the Order of Canada. In 1990, Rogers received the Golden Plate Award of the American Academy of Achievement. In 2006, he was inducted into Canada's Telecommunications Hall of Fame, along with his father, Edward S. Rogers Sr. In 2010, Rogers was inducted into the Wireless Hall of Fame for his role in the cellular industry.

== Philanthropy ==
In 2000, Rogers and his wife Loretta gave CA$26.8 million to the University of Toronto. The landmark contribution was directed to the University of Toronto Faculty of Applied Science and Engineering, which named the Edward S. Rogers Sr. Department of Electrical and Computer Engineering in honour of his father. The Rogers' gift allowed the faculty to establish the Edward S. Rogers Sr. Graduate Scholarships, the Edward S. Rogers Sr. Undergraduate Scholarships, the Edward S. Rogers Sr. Chair in Engineering, the Velma M. Rogers Graham Chair in Engineering, the Rogers AT&T Wireless Communications Laboratories and the Rogers Scholarship Program.

On May 29, 2007, Rogers and his wife made a gift of CA$15 million to Ryerson University. The donation was directed towards the Faculty of Business, which was renamed the Ted Rogers School of Management at the donors' request. The majority of the gift will be used to establish 52 new undergraduate and graduate student awards and scholarships. The gift also aims to establish a new research chair to seed academic initiatives in management research.

On November 20, 2014, the Ted Rogers Centre for Heart Research was launched after a CA$130 million gift from Rogers' family in his memory. It was at the time the largest private gift in Canadian health-care history. This Centre united The Hospital for Sick Children, University Health Network and the University of Toronto in taking new approaches to how we diagnose, treat and prevent heart failure in adults and children. It is believed to be the world's first institute to bring together research, education and innovation in personalized medicine, stem cell research, bioengineering, regenerative medicine, digital health and advanced clinical care under one umbrella with a single focus.

== Death and commemoration ==
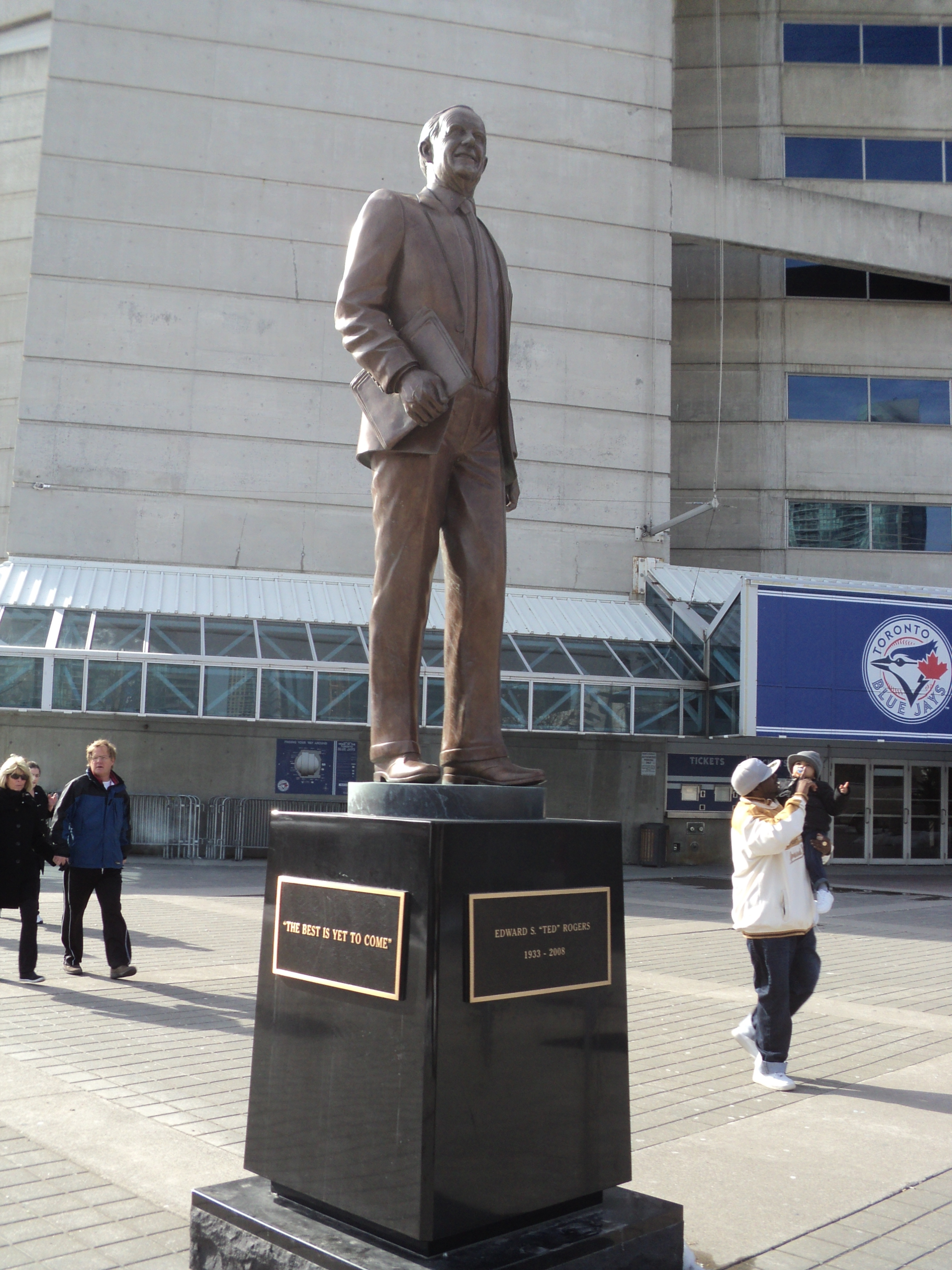
Statue of Rogers in front of Rogers Centre

Rogers suffered from congestive heart failure and died early on the morning of December 2, 2008, aged 75, at his home in Toronto. He was buried in the family plot at Mount Pleasant Cemetery, Toronto.

His autobiography, penned with communications consultant and former business journalist Robert Brehl, was titled Relentless: The True Story of the Man Behind Rogers Communications and was released just 10 weeks before Rogers' death. On December 2, 2009, the first anniversary of his death, a northern section of Jarvis Street in Toronto which runs beside the Rogers Building was renamed Ted Rogers Way in his honour.

From March 4 to 6, 2010, the first annual Ted Rogers Memorial Conference (TRMC) hosted by Ryerson University, the Ted Rogers School of Management, and the Ryerson Commerce Society took place to honour Rogers, inviting Canadian university students to learn more about Rogers. The theme of the conference revolved around the acronym TED: Take risks. Embrace innovation. Defy the status quo.

== See also ==
- Aldred-Rogers Broadcasting
- List of billionaires
- List of Upper Canada College alumni
