= Rogers Communications =

Canadian telecommunications company

Rogers Communications Inc.
- Logo used since March 2015

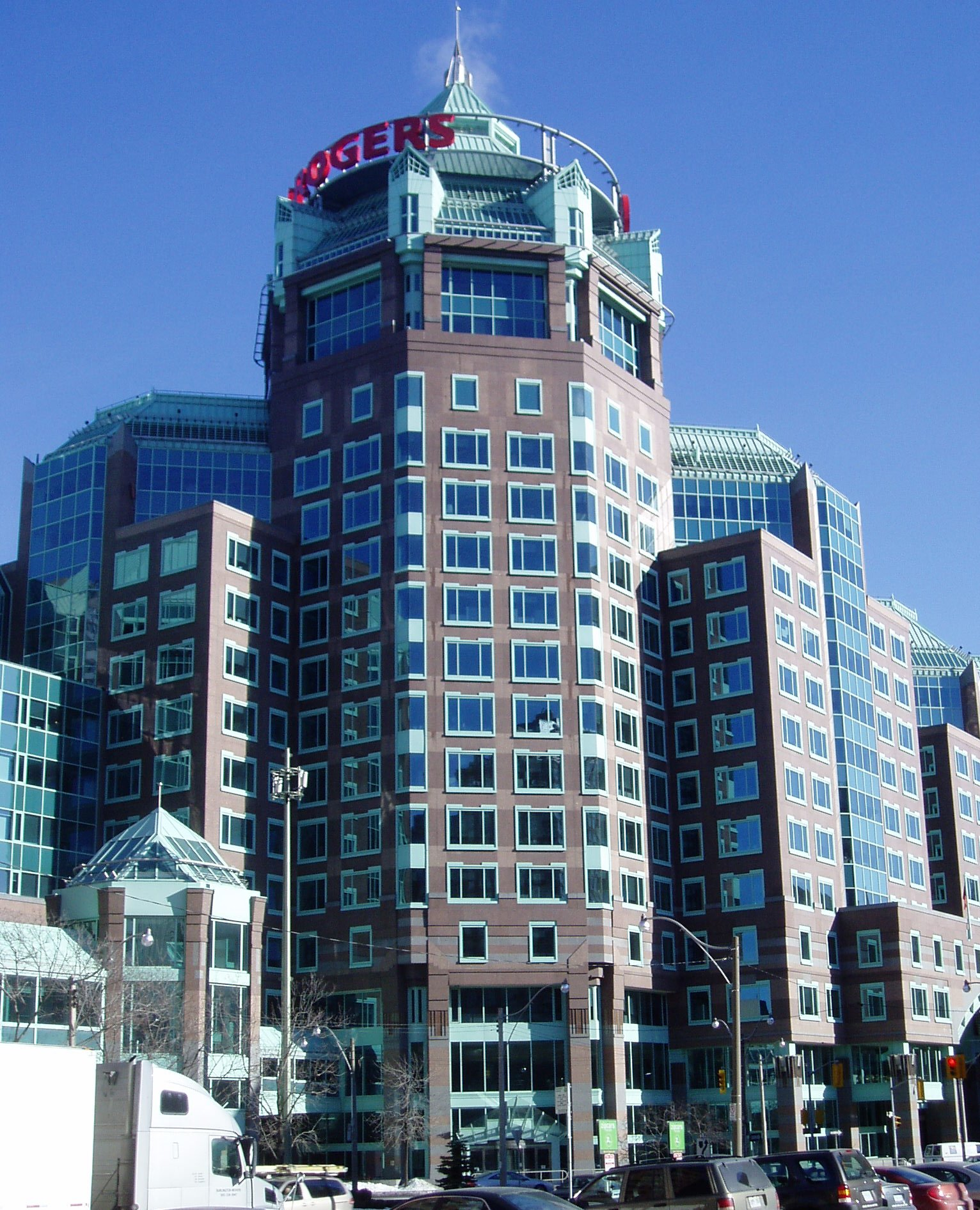
- The Rogers Building in Toronto, 2007
- Type: Public
- Traded as: TSX: RCI.A, RCI.B; NYSE: RCI; S&P/TSX 60 component
- Industry: Telecommunications; Mass media
- Founded: September 30, 1960; 66 years ago
- Founder: Ted Rogers
- Headquarters: Rogers Building, Toronto, Ontario, Canada
- Key people: Edward Rogers (chair); Tony Staffieri (president & CEO)
- Products: Landline and mobile telephony, Internet services, digital television, broadcasting, cable TV, publishing
- Revenue: ▲CA$21.71 billion (2025)
- Operating income: ▼CA$4.58 billion (2025)
- Net income: ▲CA$6.91 billion (2025)
- Total assets: ▲CA$90.01 billion (2025)
- Total equity: ▲CA$24.29 billion (2025)
- Owner: Rogers family, through Rogers Control Trust (administered by Scotiabank) (controlling shareholder)
- Number of employees: ▲25,000 (2025)
- Subsidiaries: Fido Solutions; Chatr; Glentel Inc. (50%); Rogers Bank; Rogers Cable; Rogers Sports & Media; Rogers Telecom; Rogers Wireless; Shaw Broadcast Services; Shaw Direct
- ASN: 812
- Website: www.rogers.com

Rogers Communications Inc. is a Canadian communications and media company operating primarily in the fields of wireless communications, cable television, telephony and Internet, with significant additional telecommunications, mass media, and professional sports assets. Rogers has its headquarters in Toronto, Ontario.

The company traces its origins to 1925, when Edward S. Rogers Sr. founded Rogers Vacuum Tube Company to sell battery-less radios, although this present enterprise dates to 1960, when Ted Rogers and a partner acquired the CHFI-FM radio station; they then became part-owners of a group that established the CFTO television station.

The chief competitor to Rogers is Bell Canada, which has a similarly extensive portfolio of radio and television media assets, as well as wireless, television distribution, and telephone services, particularly in Eastern and Central Canada. The two companies are often seen as having a duopoly on communications services in their regions, and both companies owned a stake of Maple Leaf Sports & Entertainment until 2025, when Rogers bought Bell's stake and became the majority owner. Rogers also competes nationally with Telus for wireless services.

Rogers Communications' acquisition of Shaw Communications in Western Canada was approved in 2023.

== History ==
Historic corporate logos

1969–1990

1990–2000

2000–2015

Logos used by Rogers Communications from 1969 to 2015

In 1925, Edward Rogers Sr. invented the world's first alternating current (AC) heater filament cathode for a radio tube, which then enabled radios to be powered by ordinary transformer-coupled household electric currents. This was a breakthrough in the technology and became a key factor in popularizing radio reception. He also established the CFRB radio station in Toronto (later acquired by outside interests). In 1931, he was awarded an experimental television licence in Canada. On May 6, 1939, he was working on radar when he died suddenly due to complications of a hemorrhage, at the age of 38. He left a widow, Velma, and a five-year-old son, Edward (known as Ted). While his business interests were subsequently sold, his son later became determined to carry on his father's legacy.

In 1960, Ted Rogers and broadcaster Joel Aldred raised money to found Aldred-Rogers Broadcasting in order to purchase CHFI, an FM radio station in Toronto. Aldred-Rogers Broadcasting also became a part-owner of Baton Aldred Rogers Broadcasting (BARB), which established CFTO-TV, Toronto's first private television station. In 1962, Rogers established CHFI (AM), an AM radio station that later became CFTR. In 1967, Rogers established Rogers Cable TV in partnership with BARB. In 1971, new CRTC regulations forced BARB to sell its 50% stake in Rogers Cable TV.

In 1979, Rogers acquired Canadian Cablesystems, and became listed on the Toronto Stock Exchange as a result. In 1980, Rogers acquired Premier Cablevision and became the largest cable company in Canada. In 1986, Rogers Cable was renamed Rogers Communications; it established operational control over Cantel, a wireless telephone company in which Rogers had a stake.

=== Acquisition of Maclean-Hunter ===
In 1989, Maclean-Hunter acquired Selkirk Communications, whose subsidiaries included All-Canada Radio & Television, a national broadcast advertising representation company. Maclean-Hunter subsequently sold All-Canada to Rogers Broadcasting. All-Canada's television representation division was sold in 1991, and on December 31, 1992, its radio operations were merged with United Broadcast Sales to form Canadian Broadcast Sales, jointly owned by Rogers Broadcasting and Westcom Radio.

In 1994, Rogers acquired Maclean-Hunter, substantially expanding its cable television, radio and publishing operations. At the time, Maclean-Hunter owned or controlled 35 cable systems, 13 AM and eight FM radio stations, two television stations, a specialty television service and a 12.5 per cent interest in the CTV Television Network. The CRTC approved Rogers's acquisition of effective control of Maclean-Hunter on December 19, 1994, subject to Rogers divesting CFCN-TV in Calgary and Maclean-Hunter's indirect interest in CTV.

=== 21st century ===
In 2000, Rogers acquired Cable Atlantic from Newfoundland businessman Danny Williams.

In July 2001, Rogers Media acquired CTV Sportsnet, which was renamed as Rogers Sportsnet that November. The FAN 590 sports radio station joined Rogers Media in August 2001, along with 14 Northern Ontario radio stations.

In fall 2004, several strategic transactions were executed that significantly increased Rogers exposure to the potential of the Canadian wireless market. Rogers acquired the 34% of Rogers Wireless owned by AT&T Wireless Services Inc. for $1.77 billion.

On December 2, 2008, Ted Rogers died of heart failure.

In 2012, Rogers Cable filed a complaint in an Ontario court against penalties levied under a 'Truth in Advertising' law, claiming that the amount of the penalties, and the requirements imposed by the law, were in violation of the Charter of Rights and Freedoms.

The company also had to recognize the rising market trend of customers canceling or foregoing cable television service subscriptions in favour of cheaper priced alternate content delivery means, such as streaming media services like Netflix, a demographic called "cord cutters" and "cord nevers". In response, Rogers acquired content with a speculated cost of $100 million to begin their own competing online streaming service, Shomi, much like the American Hulu Plus, which launched November 4, 2014. Shomi subsequently shut down after only 2 years of operation, on November 30, 2016.

In the summer of 2014, Rogers reported a 24% drop in profit compared to the previous year's second quarter.

In August 2018, Rogers launched Ignite TV, a new cable television platform. The platform is licensed from Comcast's "X1" platform.

In November 2023, Rogers acquired Canadian ISP and VOIP provider Comwave.

In July 2025, Rogers became the first Canadian wireless provider to launch satellite-to-mobile text messaging service, extending coverage to 5.4 million square kilometers through partnerships with SpaceX and Lynk Global. The service allows text messaging and text-to-911 capabilities in areas without traditional cellular coverage.

==== Acquisition of Shaw, family dispute ====
On March 15, 2021, Rogers announced its intent to acquire Shaw Communications for $26 billion, subject to regulatory and shareholder approval. This proposed acquisition was criticized by public lobby groups like Open Media, as a move that would reduce national competition in Canadian wireless communication by removing one of the four major competitors from the market.

On September 29, chief financial officer Tony Staffieri left the company. On October 8, The Globe and Mail reported that this came about following Edward Rogers' attempt to have Staffieri replace Joe Natale, a former Telus executive and the company's third CEO since Ted Rogers' death in 2008. This attempt was opposed by Edward's mother and sisters. Edward Rogers was then removed as chairman of the board, while remaining a board member, on October 21. However, a proposal to remove Edward as chair of the Rogers Control Trust, which holds the majority voting interest in Rogers Communications on behalf of the family, did not receive sufficient support from other members of the trust's advisory committee.

The following day, Edward Rogers, in his capacity as chair of the Control Trust, announced he was unilaterally enacting a written shareholder resolution replacing five of the board's independent directors, and two days later convened a meeting at which the "reconstituted" board re-appointed him as chair of the board of Rogers Communications. The legality of the resolution has been disputed by the board members that were purportedly replaced, and by other members of the Rogers family.

The CRTC approved the Shaw Communications acquisition on March 24, 2022.

In May 2022, the Canadian Competition Bureau requested an order from the Competition Tribunal blocking Rogers's takeover of Shaw Communications, arguing that the deal would substantially lessen competition by eliminating Rogers' closest competitor in the wireless sector. It also requested an injunction to stop the cable companies from closing the deal until the application can be heard.

After two years since it was first announced, Rogers' acquisition of Shaw Communications received the last regulatory approval from the Industry Minister, Francois-Philippe Champagne. To appease concerns over a lack of competition arising, Shaw will be required to sell off its Freedom Mobile wireless business to Quebecor Inc.'s Videotron for $2.85 billion. In addition, Rogers and Videotron agreed to a number of conditions requiring the addition of 3,000 jobs in Western Canada, Videotron must also offer plans 20% lower than the competition and commit to spending $150 million in the next two years to upgrade the Freedom Mobile network. Rogers and Videotron would be liable to pay upwards of $1 billion and $200 million in penalties, respectively, if the commitments were not fulfilled.

In April 2024, Rogers announced a 10-year agreement with Comcast; expanding upon its Ignite TV partnership, the agreement gives Rogers access to Comcast-developed broadband, smart home, and home security hardware.

==== 2021 and 2022 outages ====
On April 19, 2021, wireless calling, SMS messaging and data services were down throughout much of Canada for almost a full day because of a glitched software update. Rogers reimbursed consumers for the inconvenience.

On July 8, 2022, millions of customers reported issues with Rogers mobile and Internet services, including some Canada government services, such as Service Canada, Canada Revenue Agency and passport offices, as well as Canadian interbank, money transfer network Interac, ATMs and 9-1-1 services. Rogers apologized for the mass outage and said it was trying to restore services. Rogers President and CEO Tony Staffieri issued an apology via Twitter about 17 hours after the start of the incident, acknowledging the issue to the public after a day of system outage. Staffieri acknowledged that the outage stems from a failed maintenance update. Rogers has offered credit as compensation for the outage.

A report by Cloudflare suggested that the outage was due to internal, rather than external, causes. It identified spikes in BGP updates, as well as withdrawals of IP prefixes, noting that Rogers was not advertising its presence, causing other networks to not find the Rogers network. Cause of the outage or expected downtime was initially not revealed. The outage was later said to be caused by a maintenance upgrade that caused routers to malfunction, similar to the outage which occurred a year prior.

On July 11, 2022, Canada federal government opened an investigation about the most recent outage and demanded telecoms companies to make communication protocols to keep customers better informed about possible disruptions. On the same day, Industry minister François-Philippe Champagne met the CEOs of Rogers, BCE Inc, Telus Corp, Shaw Communications Inc., Quebecor Inc.'s Videotron Ltd., SaskTel and Bragg Communications Inc.'s Eastlink. During that meeting, the Industry minister asked companies to implement an agreement in 60 days in which the companies will be able to help each other during an outage in one of their networks.

As a result of the mentioned investigation, as well as scrutiny and criticism over the glitch and the company itself, some traders said the chances of a merger deal between Rogers and Shaw Communications dropped to nearly 62% on July 11, 2022 from 88% in the week earlier.

Rogers CEO, Tony Staffieri, blamed the outage on the maintenance update, and offered a five day service credit to the customers as a sign of apology.

== Corporate governance ==
Rogers Communications is traded on the Toronto Stock Exchange and on the New York Stock Exchange under ticker "RCI".

Following the death of Ted Rogers in 2008, control of Rogers Communications passed to the Rogers Control Trust, a trust for which a subsidiary of Scotiabank serves as trustee. Edward Rogers and daughter Melinda Rogers serve, respectively, as chairman and vice-chair of the trust.

The current members of the board of directors of Rogers Communications are:

- Edward Rogers (Executive Chair)
- Robert J. Gemmell (Lead Director)
- Tony Staffieri (President & CEO)
- Michael Cooper
- Trevor English
- Ivan Fecan
- Jan Innes
- Diane A. Kazarian, FCPA, CA
- Dr. Mohamed Lachemi
- David A. Robinson
- Lisa Rogers
- Bradley Shaw
- Wayne Sparrow
- John H. Tory, K.C., O.Ont.

A previous composition of the board was disputed by Edward Rogers, who, in his capacity as chair of the Rogers Control Trust, announced on October 22 that Brooks, Clappison, Jacob, MacDonald, and Peterson had been replaced on the board by Michael Cooper, Jack Cockwell, Ivan Fecan, Jan Innes, and John Kerr. On October 24, this re-constituted board re-appointed Edward Rogers as chair of the board. Despite the Supreme Court of British Columbia's legal affirmation of the changes, they had been described as "invalid" by the three other Rogers family members on the company's board, as well as the replaced individuals.

In November 2021, Tony Staffieri succeeded Joe Natale and was appointed the new interim president and CEO. In January 2022, Staffieri was appointed to the position permanently.

The senior corporate officers of Rogers Communications currently are:

- Tony Staffieri (President & CEO)
- Navdeep Bains (Chief Corporate Affairs Officer)
- Marisa Fabiano (Chief Human Resources Officer)
- Iain Kennedy (Chief Information and Cyber Security Officer)
- Mark Kennedy (Chief Technology Office)
- Bret Leech (President, Residential)
- Anne Martin-Vachon (President, Wireless)
- Thomas A. Turner (President, Business)
- Terrie Tweddle (Chief Brand and Communications Officer)
- Colette Watson (President, Rogers Sports and Media)
- Mahes Wickramasinghe (President, Group Operations)
- Marisa Wyse (Chief Legal Officer and Corporate Secretary)

== Assets and divisions ==
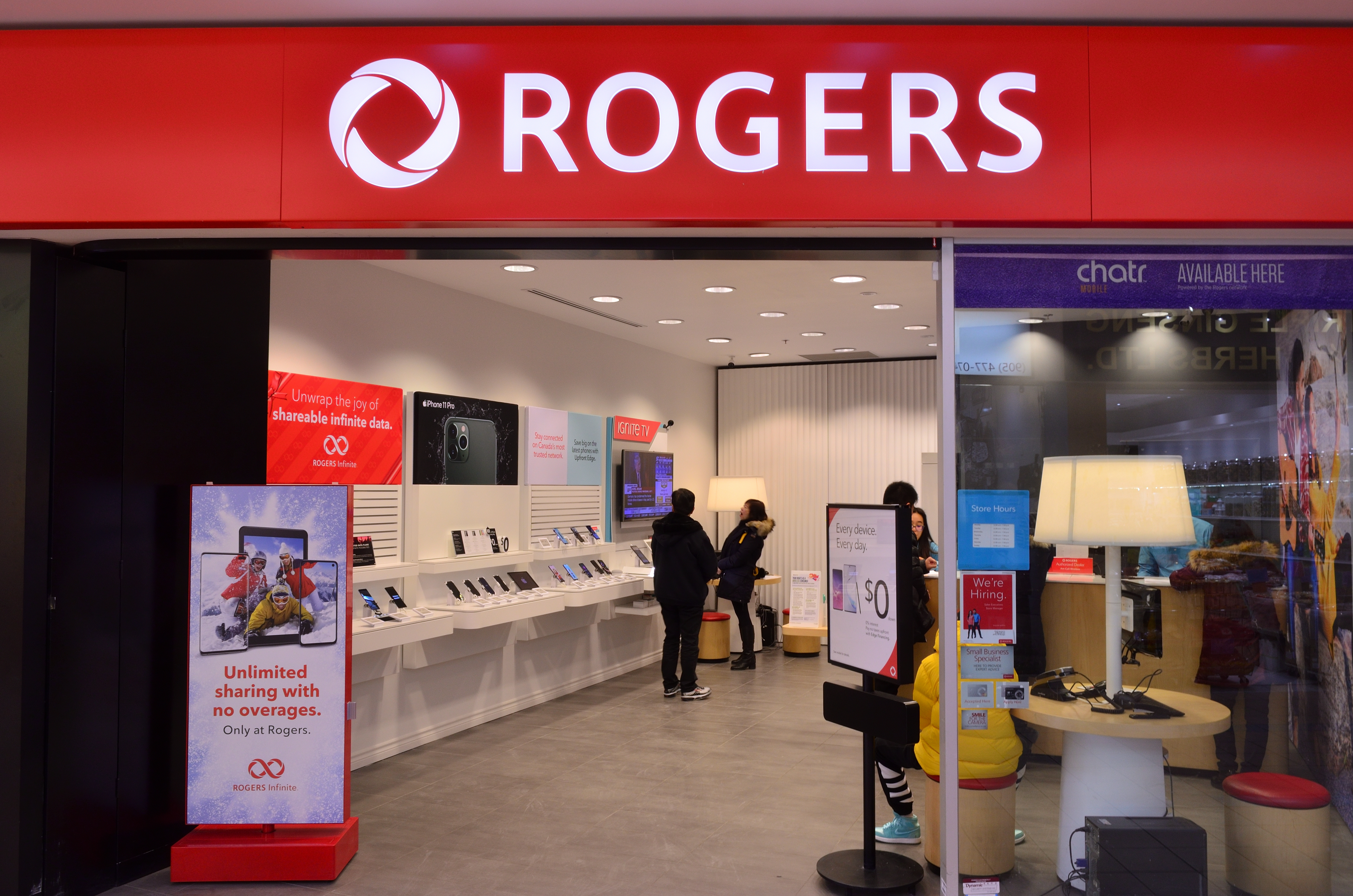
A Rogers store offering services from Rogers Wireless, a wireless telephone subsidiary of the company

Assets and divisions of Rogers Communications include:

- Telecommunications: Rogers Wireless, Fido Wireless, Rogers Home Phone, Shaw Cablesystems, Shaw Telecom
- Distribution: Rogers Cable, Shaw Broadcast Services, Shaw Direct, Rogers on Demand, Today's Shopping Choice
- Sports (via Rogers Sports): Radio Stations, Television Stations, Discretionary (Specialty) TV Services, Rogers Centre, Toronto Blue Jays, MLSE
- Internet: Rogers Internet, Rogers Home Monitoring
- Financial: Rogers Bank

=== Rogers Sports & Media ===
In addition to its ownership of Sportsnet, acquired from CTV, Sportsnet One and Sportsnet World, Rogers Sports & Media operates the Toronto Blue Jays baseball team through Rogers Blue Jays Baseball Partnership and the Rogers Centre (previously known as SkyDome). Through Sportsnet, Rogers Sports & Media also holds a 50% ownership in Dome Productions, a mobile production and distribution joint venture that is a leader in high-definition television production and broadcasting in Canada. Rogers also owns the naming rights to Rogers Arena, home of the Vancouver Canucks, as well as Rogers Place, the home of the Edmonton Oilers.

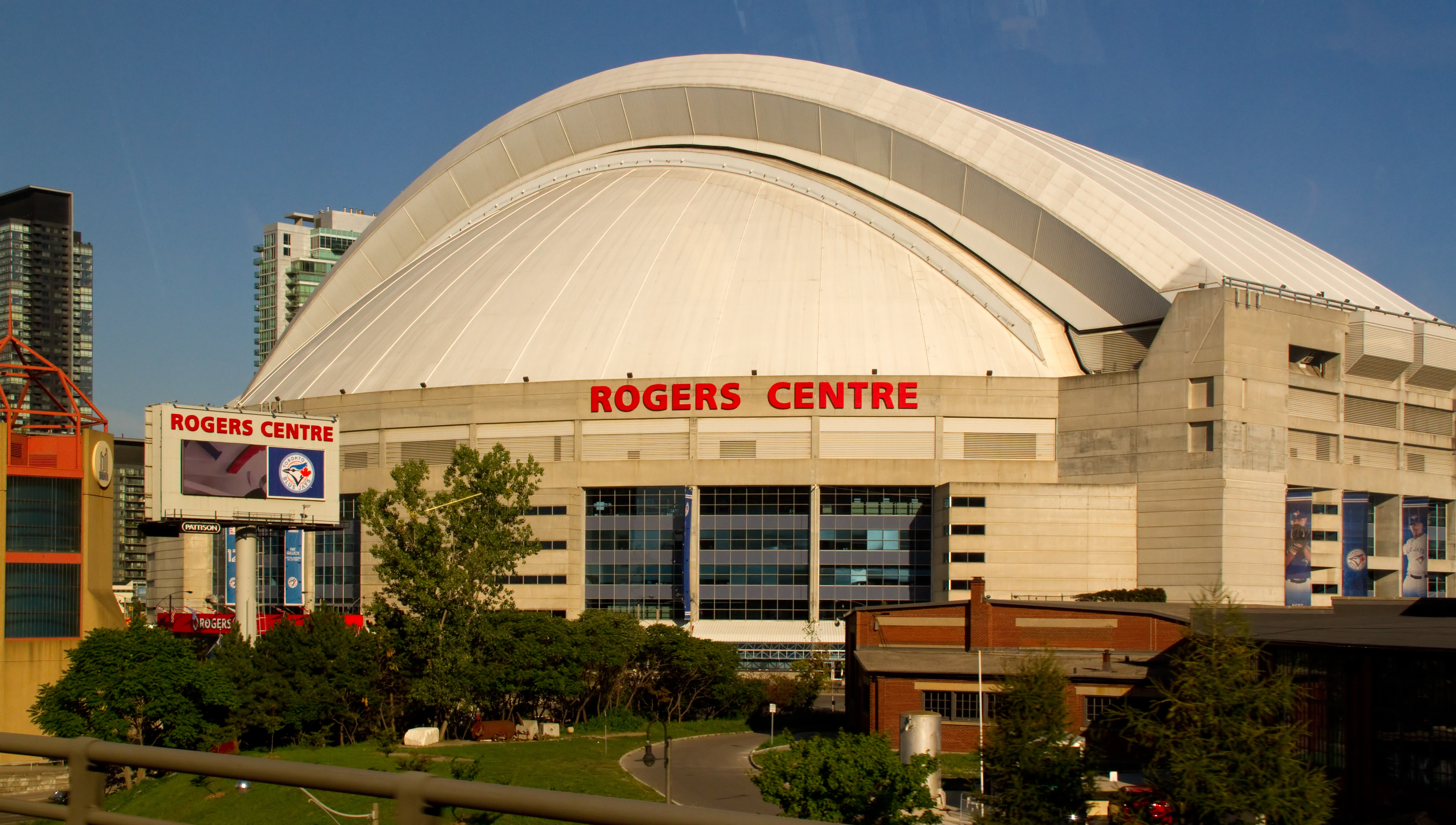
The Rogers Centre is a multi-purpose stadium that is operated by the company.

Rogers Communications owns Maple Leaf Sports & Entertainment, owners of the Toronto Maple Leafs of the National Hockey League, Toronto Raptors of the National Basketball Association, Toronto Argonauts of the Canadian Football League, and Toronto FC of Major League Soccer, as well as their minor league farm teams, the Toronto Marlies of the American Hockey League (AHL), Raptors 905 of the NBA G League and Toronto FC II of MLS Next Pro, respectively.

On June 28, 2007, Rogers offered to sell the two religious-licensed OMNI stations in Winnipeg and Vancouver as part of the Citytv deal, although the company stated that it intended to retain the multilingual-licensed OMNI stations. In September 2007, Rogers applied to the CRTC to acquire 20 per cent of CablePulse 24, a local news channel in Toronto.

On August 25, 2012, Rogers Media agreed to acquire Score Media which includes The Score Television Network for $167 million, including a 10% stake of its digital business. The deal was completed on Oct. 19, 2012.

In 2012, Rogers purchased CJNT-DT Montreal, and on February 3, 2013, it was rebranded as City Montreal.

==== National Hockey League ====
On November 26, 2013, Rogers Communications Inc, unveiled the details of a 12-year, C$5.2 billion partnership with the National Hockey League which began in the 2014–15 season. This gave Rogers the controlling stake for national broadcast and digital rights of the NHL and ultimately gave them the ability to stream all NHL feeds on all of their current platforms replacing both Bell Media and CBC Sports as the national broadcast and cable television rightsholders respectively. The effects of this deal shifted the balance of power in the country's broadcast industry as it drove up demand for Rogers Cable TV subscriptions. This transaction marked the first time a first-class North American-wide sports league has allowed all its national right to one company on a long-term basis. As part of the deal, Rogers also took over Canadian distribution of the NHL Centre Ice and GameCentre Live services. National English-language coverage of the NHL is carried primarily by Rogers' Sportsnet group of specialty channels; Sportsnet holds an exclusive window for games played on Wednesday nights. Hockey Night in Canada was maintained and expanded under the deal, airing up to seven games nationally on Saturday nights throughout the regular season across CBC Television, the Sportsnet networks, Rogers-owned television network Citytv, and FX Canada. While CBC maintains Rogers-produced NHL coverage during the regular season and playoffs through a time-brokerage agreement with the company, Rogers assumes editorial control and the ownership of any advertising revenue from the telecasts. Citytv (and later Sportsnet) also airs a Sunday night game of the week, Rogers Hometown Hockey, which features a pre-game show originating from various Canadian communities. Sportsnet's networks also air occasional games involving all-U.S. matchups.

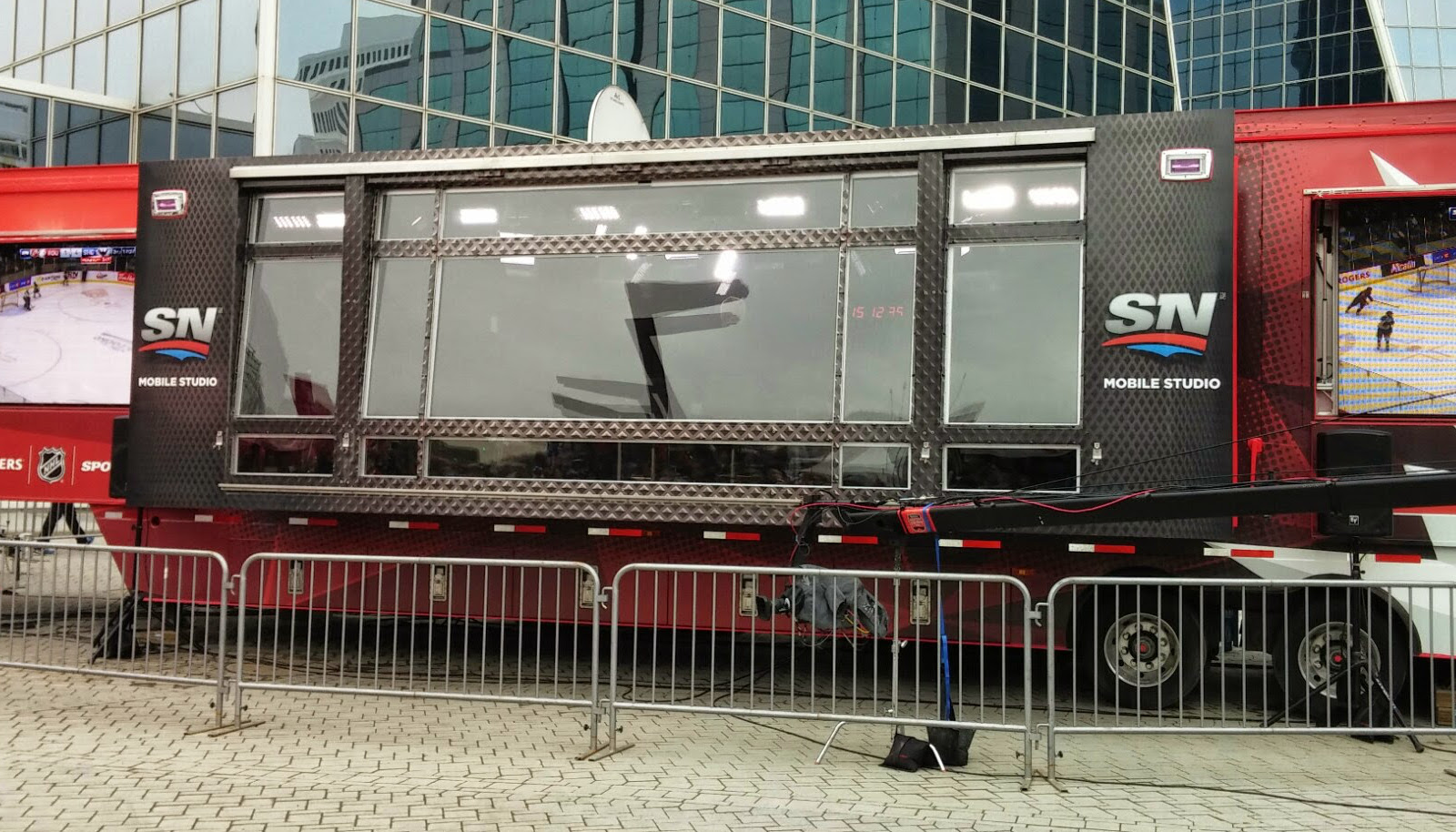
A Sportsnet mobile studio in Regina during Sportsnet's Rogers Hometown Hockey tour

Under a sub-licensing agreement with Rogers, Quebecor Media holds national French-language rights to the NHL, with all coverage airing on its specialty channel TVA Sports. TVA Sports' flagship broadcasts on Saturday nights focus primarily on the Montreal Canadiens.

Rogers sought to increase the prominence of NHL content on digital platforms by re-launching the NHL's digital out-of-market sports package GameCentre Live as Rogers NHL GameCentre Live, adding the ability to stream all of Rogers' national NHL telecasts, along with in-market streaming of regional games for teams whose regional rights are held by Sportsnet. GamePlus—an additional mode featuring alternate camera angles intended for a second screen experience, such as angles focusing on certain players, net and referee cameras, and a Skycam in selected venues, was also added exclusively for GameCentre Live subscribers who are subscribed to Rogers' cable, internet, or wireless services.

In the lead-up to the 2014–15 season, Rogers began to promote its networks as the new home of the NHL through a multi-platform advertising campaign; the campaign featured advertising and cross-promotions across Rogers' properties, such as The Shopping Channel, which began to feature presentations of NHL merchandise, and its parenting magazine Today's Parent, which began to feature hockey-themed stories in its issues. On May 28, 2014, Rogers announced a six-year sponsorship deal with Scotiabank, which saw the bank become the title sponsor for Wednesday Night Hockey and Hockey Day in Canada, and become a sponsor for other segments and initiatives throughout Rogers' NHL coverage.

On October 6, 2014, Rogers and NHL began their media sales venture in which Rogers will lead all Canadian national NHL media sales across its owned and operated broadcast and digital platforms as well as ad sales for League-owned digital assets in Canada.

=== Rogers Bank ===
Rogers Bank (French: Banque Rogers) is a Canadian financial services company wholly owned by Rogers Communications. Rogers applied to the Minister of Finance under the Bank Act for permission to establish a Schedule I bank (a domestic bank that may accept deposits) in summer 2011. At launch, Rogers Bank offered a Rogers-branded credit card targeted at existing customers. A companion card branded for Rogers subsidiary Fido was introduced in 2016, but is no longer accepting new applications. The bank offers four credit card tiers to Canadians: the Rogers Red Mastercard, Rogers Red World Mastercard, Rogers Red World Elite Mastercard, and Rogers Red World Legend Mastercard. It also offers the Rogers Red World Elite Business Mastercard for self-employed individuals and business owners.

== Former assets, products and services ==
=== Publishing ===
Prior to 2019, Rogers Publishing Limited published more than 70 consumer magazines and trade and professional publications, digital properties and directories in Canada, including Maclean's, Canada's weekly newsmagazine; its French-language equivalent, L'actualité; Sportsnet Magazine; Chatelaine; Flare; and a variety of other magazines and their companion websites. The publishing arm was once part of the Maclean-Hunter Publishing empire. Rogers did not have printing facilities and contracted out services in 2008 to Montreal-based TC Transcontinental to print magazines from their plants across Canada.

In March 2019, Rogers sold their magazine brands, including Maclean's, Chatelaine and HELLO! Canada, to St. Joseph Communications for an undisclosed sum.

=== OutRank by Rogers ===
In 2011, a partnership was formed between Rogers Communications and Yodle, Inc to provide a suite of digital marketing services to Canadian small, medium, and enterprise size business. These are marketed under the name OutRank by Rogers and operate as a business unit within the company. Services include search engine optimization, mobile marketing, social media marketing, pay per click, and analytics. The opening was announced in January 2012 with the launch of their first client, Ontario-based CLS Roofing. OutRank by Rogers is a Google Premier SMB Partner and promotes responsive web design. The company is a donor to the Ronald Mcdonald House of Toronto.

=== Zoocasa ===
In 2008, Rogers Communications launched Zoocasa, an online real estate listing service. The company later became a licensed real estate brokerage and in May 2013, the website relaunched to allow homebuyers to find properties and agents. The service also provided rebates on real estate commissions to buyers and sellers. Zoocasa was shut down on June 22, 2015. The website's domain and technology were purchased for $350,000 and the website relaunched on July 2, 2015, under new ownership.

=== Texture ===
Texture (previously known as Next Issue) was a digital magazine app introduced to the Canadian market by Rogers in 2013. The service had a monthly subscription fee that gave readers access to over 200 magazines in English and French.

Texture was purchased by Apple in 2018; in 2019, it was discontinued and integrated into Apple News+.

== See also ==
- Rogers TV
- TV Rogers
- Rogers Cable
- Media ownership in Canada
- List of telephone operating companies
