= Canadian Jewish Book Awards =

Canadian program of literary awards

Vine Awards for Canadian Jewish Literature
- Description: Annual literary awards honoring outstanding literature by Canadian Jewish writers or on Jewish themes
- Country: Canada
- Presented by: Koffler Centre of the Arts

The Helen and Stan Vine Canadian Jewish Book Awards were a Canadian program of literary awards, managed, produced and presented annually by the Koffler Centre of the Arts to works judged to be the year's best works of literature by Jewish Canadian writers or on Jewish cultural and historical topics.

== History ==
In December 2014, The Koffler Centre of the Arts announced that the Awards were being "put on hiatus for 2015 and will resume, invigorated and reinvented, in 2016" as the Koffler recalibrates and revamps several of its current programs. In its place, a group of jury members formed the Canadian Jewish Literary Awards for 2015.

In February 2016, after a one-year hiatus, the Koffler Centre of the Arts relaunched the awards as the Vine Awards for Canadian Jewish Literature.

== Categories and prize ==
The new awards have five categories, each with a $10,000 prize.

1. Fiction
2. Non-Fiction
3. History
4. Young Adult/Children's Literature
5. Poetry (awarded every three years)

== List of winners of the Canadian Jewish Book Awards (1989 - 2014) ==
=== 1989 ===
- Jewish Book Committee Award: Szloma Renglich, When Paupers Dance
- Joseph Tannenbaum Award: Michael R. Marrus, The Holocaust in History

=== 1990 ===
- Yiddish Literature: Simcha Simkhovitch, Tzaar un Treist
- Excellence in Scholarship on a Canadian Jewish Subject: Michael Greenstein, Third Solitudes: Tradition and Discontinuity in Jewish Canadian Literature
- Creative Writing: J. J. Steinfeld, Forms of Captivity and Escape
- Joseph Tanenbaum Holocaust Book Award: Harold Troper and Morton Weinfeld, Old Wounds: Jews, Ukrainians and the Hunt for Nazi War Criminals in Canada

=== 1991 ===
- Penina Rubinoff Memorial Award for Rabbinic Scholarship: Martin Lockshin, Rabbi Samuel Ben Meir's Commentary on Genesis
- Non-fiction: Miriam Waddington, Apartment Seven: Essays Selected and New
- Poetry: Kenneth Sherman, Jackson's Point
- Joseph Tanenbaum Holocaust Book Award: Ibolya Grossman, An Ordinary Woman in Extraordinary Times

=== 1992 ===
- Penina Rubinoff Memorial Award for Biblical and Rabbinic Scholarship: Rabbi Gedalia Felder, Yasodei Yeshurun: A Collection of Comments and Notes on Masechet Avat
- Book Committee Award for Yiddish: Peretz Miransky, A Zemer Fun Demer
- The Book Committee Award for Creative Writing (Fiction): Morley Torgov, Saint Farb's Day
- The Izzy and Betty Kirshenbaum Foundation Award for Poetry: Simcha Simkhovitch, Selected Poems
- Joseph Tanenbaum Holocaust Book Award: Karolina and Andrzej Jus, Our Journey in the Valley of Tears
- Literary Criticism: Rachel Feldhay Brenner, A.M.Klein: The Father of Canadian Jewish Literature

=== 1993 ===
- Penina Rubinoff Memorial Award for Biblical and Rabbinic Scholarship: Rabbi J. Schochet, Mashiach: The Principle of Mashiach and the Messianic in Jewish Law and Tradition
- Izzy and Betty Kirshenbaum Award for Yiddish: Sam Simchovitz, Stepchild on the Vistula
- Jewish Book Committee Award for Creative Writing: Shel Krakofsky, The Reversible Coat
- Jewish Book Committee Award for Autobiography / Memoir: Eta Fuchs Berk and Gilbert Allardyce, Chosen: A Holocaust Memoir
- Jewish Book Committee Award for Historical Scholarship: Alan Davies, Anti-Semitism in Canada
- Drs Andrzej and Jus Holocaust Literature Award: David Smuschkowitz, Peter Silverman, Peter Smuszkowicz From Victims to Victors
- History Award: Michael R. Marrus, Mr. Sam: The Life and Times of Samuel Bronfman

=== 1994 ===
- Penina Rubinoff Memorial Award for Biblical and Rabbinic Scholarship: Rabbi Chaim Nussbaum, Semblance and Reality
- Canadian Society for Yad Vashem Award for Scholarship on a Canadian Jewish Subject: Esther Delisle, The Traitor and the Jew
- Nachman Sokol Memorial Award for Canadian Jewish History: Gerald Tulchinsky, Taking Root
- Henry Fuerstenberg Memorial Award for Creative Writing in Poetry: Seymour Mayne, Killing Time
- Jewish Book Committee Award for Creative Writing in Fiction: Abraham Boyarsky, The Number Hall
- Jewish Book Committee Award for Creative Writing in Fiction: Szloma Renglich, In the Heart of Warsaw
- Jewish Book Committee Award for Journal / Memoir: Eli Rubenstein, For You Who Died I Must Live On...Reflections on the March of the Living
- Joseph and Faye Tannenbaum Memorial Award for Cultural History: Ivan Kalmar, The Trotskys, Freuds and Woody Allens
- Drs Andrzej and Jus Holocaust Literature Award: Ariella B. Samson, A Letter from My Father

=== 1995 ===
- Penina Rubinoff Memorial Award for Torah Scholarship: Rabbi Aaron Levine, To Comfort the Bereaved
- Canadian Society for Yad Vashem Award for Scholarship on a Canadian Jewish Subject: Andre Stein, Hidden Children; Forgotten Survivors of the Holocaust
- Izzy and Betty Kirshenbaum Foundation Award for Original Translation from Yiddish: Sam Simchovitz, Stepchild on the Vistula
- Izzy and Betty Kirshenbaum Foundation Award for Yiddish: Grunia Slutsky-Khon, Don't Look So Sad in the Window
- Henry Fuerstenberg Memorial Award for Creative Writing in Poetry: Peter Ormshaw, The Purity of Arms
- Rachel Bessin Memorial Award for Writing for Young People: Lillian Boraks-Nemetz, The Old Brown Suitcase
- Jewish Book Committee Award for Fiction: Cary Fagan, The Animal's Waltz
- Joseph and Faye Tannenbaum Memorial Award for Holocaust Literature: Jack Kuper, After the Smoke Cleared

=== 1996 ===
- Betty and Morris Aaron Prize for Biography or Memoir: Eva Brewster, Progeny of Light/Vanished in Darkness
- Joseph and Fay Tannenbaum Award for Canadian Jewish History: Sheldon J. Godfrey and Judith C. Godfrey, Search Out the Land: The Jews and the Growth of Equality in British Colonial America 1740-1867
- Koffler Centre of the Arts President's Award for Jewish History: Erna Paris, The End of Days: A Story of Tolerance, Tyranny and the Expulsion of the Jew from Spain
- Penina Rubinoff Memorial Award for Biblical Scholarship: Shoshana P. Zolty, And All Your Children Shall Be Learned
- Harry and Florence Topper/ Milton Shier Prize for Original Translation from Yiddish: Frieda Forman, Ethel Raicus, Sarah Silverstein Swartz, Margie Wolfe, Found Treasures- Stories by Yiddish Women Writers
- Henry Fuerstenberg Memorial Award for Creative Writing in Poetry: Shel Krakofsky, Blind Messiah
- Louis Lockshin Memorial Award for Children's Literature: Gary Clement, Just Stay Put
- Rachel Bessin Memorial Award for Writing for Young People: Walter Buchignani, Tell No One Who You Are
- Bessie and Harry Frisch Memorial Award for Jewish Fiction: Agnes Jelhof Jensen, Dilemma
- Canadian Society for Yad Vashem Award for Holocaust Literature: Eric Koch, Hilmar and Odette

=== 1997 ===
- Joseph and Fay Tannenbaum Award for Canadian Jewish History: Yves Lavertu, The Bernonville Affair
- Joseph and Fay Tannenbaum Award for Canadian Jewish History: Fraidie Martz, Open Your Hearts
- Canadian Society for Yad Vashem Award in Holocaust History: Dr/ Felicia Carmelly, Shattered: 50 Years of Silence
- Penina Rubinoff Memorial Award for Biblical Scholarship: Rabbi Steven Saltzman, A Small Glimmer of Light: Reflections on the Book of Genesis
- Harry and Florence Topper/ Milton Shier Prize for Original Translation from Yiddish: Simcha Simchovitch, A Song Will Remain
- Betty and Morris Aaron Prize for Scholarship on a Canadian Subject: Mervin Butovsky and Ira Robinson, Renewing Our Days
- Henry Fuerstenberg Award for Poetry: Roger Nash, In the Kosher Chow Mein Restaurant
- Louis Lockshin Memorial Award for Creative Writing in Poetry: Seymour Mayne and B. Glen Rotchin, Jerusalem
- Rachel Bessin/Isaac Frischwasser Memorial Award for Young Adult Fiction: Carol Matas, After the War
- Martin and Beatrice Fischer Prize for Fiction: Anne Michaels, Fugitive Pieces
- Koffler Centre of the Arts President's Award for Holocaust Literature: Manny Drukier, Carved in Stone

=== 1998 ===
- Joseph and Fay Tannenbaum Award for Canadian Jewish History: Alan Davies and Marilyn Nefsky, How Silent Were the Churches
- Canadian Society for Yad Vashem Award in Holocaust History: Isabel Vincent, Hitler's Silent Partners
- Morris Winemaker Prize in Literary Criticism: Norman Ravvin, A House of Words
- Penina Rubinoff Memorial Award for Biblical Scholarship: Martin Lockshin, Rashbaums's Commentary on Exodus
- The Jewish Book Awards Committee Prize for Memoir/Biography: Rosalie Sharp, Irving Abella, Edwin Goodman, Growing Up Jewish
- Izzy and Betty Kirshenbaum Foundation Prize for Yiddish: Simcha Simchovitch, Funken in Zhar (Sparks in Embers)
- Betty and Morris Aaron Prize for Scholarship on a Canadian Subject: Elizabeth Greene, We Who Can Fly
- Henry Fuerstenberg Award for Poetry: Carol Rose, Behind The Blue Gate
- Rachel Bessin/Isaac Frischwasser Memorial Award for Young Adult Fiction: Carol Matas, The Garden
- Martin and Beatrice Fischer Award for Holocaust Literature: Régine Robin, The Wanderer
- Dorothy Schoichet President's Award for Holocaust Literature: Roma Karsh, Endless
- Elie Wiesel Prize in Holocaust Memoir: Elaine Kalman Naves, Journey to Vaja
- Elie Wiesel Prize in Holocaust Memoir: Vera Schiff, Theresienstadt

=== 1999 ===
- Sam Bojman Memorial Prize in Jewish History: Noah N. Shneidman, Jerusalem of Lithuania: The Rise and Fall of Jewish Vilnius, a Personal Perspective
- Canadian Society for Yad Vashem Award in Holocaust History: Allan Levine, Fugitives of the Forest
- Louis L Lockshin Prize for Short Fiction: Nora Gold, Marrow and Other Stories
- Morris Winemaker Prize in Literary Criticism: Kenneth Sherman, Void and Voice: Essays on Literary and Historical Currents
- Dorothy Shiochet President's Award for Biblical and Rabbinic Scholarship: Rabbi Elyse Goldstein, ReVisions: Seeing Torah Through a Feminist Lens
- Henry Fuerstenberg Award for Poetry: Robin McGrath, Escaped Domestics
- Isaac Frischwasser Memorial Award for Young Adult Fiction: Irene Watts, Goodbye Marianne
- Martin and Beatrice Fischer Award in Fiction: Lilian Nattel, The River Midnight
- Betty and Morris Aaron Prize for Holocaust Memoir: Elizabeth M. Raab, And Peace Never Came

=== 2000 ===
- Louis L Lockshin Memorial Prize: Sarah Silberstein Swartz and Margie Wolfe, From Memory to Transformation: Jewish Women's Voices
- The Joseph and Faye Tanenbaum Award for Canadian Jewish History: Bruce Muirhead, Against The Odds: The Public Life and Times of Louis Rasminsky
- Isaac Frischwasser Prize for Holocaust Memoir: Arthur Schaller, 100 Cigarettes and a Bottle of Vodka
- Dorothy Shoichet President's Prize for Feminist Jewish Literature: Adele Reinhartz, Why Ask My Name? Anonymity and Identity in Biblical Narrative
- Penina Rubinoff Memorial Prize in Biblical/Rabbinic Scholarship: Shlomo Zalman Elazer Grafstein, Judaism's Bible: A New and Expanded Translation
- Izzy and Betty Kirshenbaum Foundation Prize for Yiddish translation: Simcha Simchovitch, The Remnant
- Henry Fuerstenberg and Betty and Morris Aaron Prize for Poetry: Seymour Mayne and B. Glen Rotchin, A Rich Garland
- Henry Fuerstenberg and Betty and Morris Aaron Prize for Poetry: Malca Janice Litovitz, To Light, To Water
- Fanny Lidsky Memorial Prize for Young Adult Fiction: Kathy Kacer, Gabi's Dresser
- Martin and Beatrice Fischer Award in Fiction: Nancy Huston, The Mark of the Angel
- Abraham and Fay Bergel Prize for Holocaust history: Naomi Kramer and Ronald Headland, The Fallacy of Race and the Shoah

=== 2001 ===
- Dorothy Shoichet Chairperson's Award for Jewish History: Erna Paris, Long Shadows: Truth Lies and History
- Louis L Lockshin Memorial Prize: Matt Cohen, Typing: A Life in 26 Keys
- Canadian Jewish Book Awards Committee Prize: Al Waxman, That's What I Am
- The Joseph and Faye Tanenbaum Award for Canadian Jewish History: Frank Bialystok, Delayed Impact: The Holocaust and the Canadian Jewish Community
- Martin and Beatrice Fischer First Novel Award: Michael Kaufman, The Possibility of Dreaming on a Night Without Stars
- Penina Rubinoff Memorial Prize in Biblical Scholarship: Barry Dov Walfish, Apples of Gold in Settings of Silver
- Morris Winemaker Prize in Scholarship on a Jewish Theme: Howard Margolian, Unauthorized Entry: The Truth about Nazi War criminals in Canada 1946-1956
- Izzy and Betty Kirshenbaum Foundation Prize for Yiddish: Vivian Felsen. Montreal of Yesterday
- Henry Fuerstenberg / Betty and Morris Aaron Poetry Award: Karen Shenfeld, The Law of Return
- Isaac Frischwasser Memorial Award for Young Adult Fiction: Irene Watts, Remember Me
- The Canadian Society for Yad Vashem Award in Holocaust History: FC Decoste and Bernard Schwartz, The Holocaust's Ghost
- Laks-Wajsfus Prize in World Jewish Culture: Dorion Liebgott, Art and Tradition
- Abraham and Fay Bergel Prize for Holocaust Memoir: Gitel Donath, My Bones Don't Rest in Auschwitz

=== 2002 ===
- The Abraham and Fay Bergel Prize in Scholarship on a Jewish Subject: Morton Weinfeld, Like Everyone Else- But Different
- The Koffler Centre Presidents' Award for Biography/Memoir: William Weintraub, Getting Started
- The Joseph and Faye Tanenbaum Prize in Canadian Jewish History: Janine Stingel, Social Discredit
- The Nachman Sokol-Mollie Halberstadt Prize in Biblical Scholarship: Eric Lawee, Isaac Abarbanel's Stance Toward Tradition
- The Izzy and Betty Kirshenbaum Foundation Award in Yiddish: Simcha Simchovich, The Song That Never Died
- The Betty and Morris Aaron-Henry Fuerstenberg Poetry Prize: Joseph Sherman, American Standard
- The Isaac Frischwasser Memorial Award in Children's Literature: Cary Fagan, The Market Wedding
- Martin and Beatrice Fischer Award in Fiction: Emma Richler, Sister Crazy
- The Canadian Society for Yad Vashem Award in Holocaust Memoir: Rabbi Erwin Schild. The Very Narrow Bridge

=== 2003 ===
- The Jack Chisvin Family Award in Holocaust Memoir: Joil Alpern, No One Awaiting Me: Two Brothers Defy Death During the Holocaust in Romania
- The Abraham and Fay Bergel Prize in Scholarship on a Jewish Subject: Adrienne Kertzner, My Mother's Voice: Children, Literature and the Holocaust
- The Koffler Centre Presidents' Prize in History: Henry T. Aubin, The Rescue of Jerusalem: the Alliance Between Hebrews and Africans in 701 BC
- The Joseph and Faye Tanenbaum Prize in Canadian Jewish History: Theresa and Albert Moritz, The World's Most Dangerous Woman: A New Biography of Emma Goldman
- The Nachman Sokol-Mollie Halberstadt Prize in Biblical/Rabbinic Scholarship: James Diamond, Maimonides and the Hermeneutics of Concealment
- The Izzy and Betty Kirshenbaum Foundation Award in Yiddish Translation: Pierre Anctil, Le Montreal Juif Entre les Deux Guerres
- The Louis Lockshin - Frances and Samuel Stein Memorial Award in Biography/Memoir: Vivian Kaplan, Ten Green Bottles: Vienna to Shanghai, Journey of Hope and Fear
- The Betty and Morris Aaron - Henry Fuerstenberg Memorial Prize in Poetry: Ron Charach, Dungenessque
- The Isaac Frischwasser Memorial Award in Children's Literature: Karen Levine, Hana's Suitcase
- Martin and Beatrice Fischer Award in Fiction: Nancy Richler, Your Mouth is Lovely
- The Canadian Society for Yad Vashem Award in Holocaust Studies: N.N. Shneidman. The Three Tragic Heroes of the Vilnius Ghetto: Witenberg, Sheinbaum, Gens

=== 2004 ===
- The Jack Chisvin Family Award in Holocaust Memoir: Henry Schogt, The Curtain: Witness and Memory in Wartime Holland
- The Joseph and Faye Tanenbaum Prize in Scholarship on a Jewish Subject: Loren Lerner, Afterimage: Evocations of the Holocaust in Contemporary Canadian Arts and Literature
- The Nachman Sokol-Chaim Yoel and Mollie Halberstadt Prize in Yiddish/ Translation from Yiddish: Simcha Simchovitch, Dem Netzach Antkegn: Gezamlte Lider and Out of the Abyss: Collected Poems
- The Louis Lockshin - Frances and Samuel Stein Memorial Award in Biography/Memoir: Joel Yanofsky, Mordecai & Me: an Appreciation of a Kind
- The Betty and Morris Aaron - Henry and Regina Fuerstenberg Memorial Prize in Poetry: Merle Nudelman, Borrowed Light
- The Canadian Jewish News Prize in Children's literature: Aubrey Davis, Bagels From Benny
- Martin and Beatrice Fischer Award in Fiction: Kate Taylor, Mme. Proust and the Kosher Kitchen
- The Canadian Society for Yad Vashem Award in Holocaust Studies: Lillian Boraks-Nemetz and Irene Watts, Tapestry of Hope: Holocaust Writing for Young People
- The Isaac Frischwasser Memorial Award in Holocaust Literature: Ruth Mandel. How to Tell Your Children about the Holocaust

=== 2005 ===
- The Jack Chisvin Family Award in Holocaust Memoir: Jack Weiss, Memories, Dreams and Nightmares
- The Nachman Sokol-Chaim Yoel and Mollie Halberstadt Award in Biblical/ Rabbinic Scholarship: Martin Lockshin, Rashbam's Commentary on Deuteronomy
- Abe and Fay Bergel Award in Scholarship on a Jewish Subject: Richarda Menkis and Norman Ravin, The Canadian Jewish Studies Reader
- Abraham and Eve Trapunski Prize in Yiddish Literature and Translation from Yiddish: Chava Rosenfarb and Goldie Morgentaler, Survivors
- The Presidents' Award in History: Warren Bass, Support Any Friend
- The Joseph and Faye Tanenbaum Prize in Canadian Jewish History: Jill Culiner, Finding Home
- Jack Chisvin Family Award in Biography/Memoir: James Laxer, Red Diaper Baby
- Canadian Jewish News Prize in Poetry: Isa Milman, Between the Doorposts
- Frances and Samuel Stein Memorial Award in Children's Literature: Anne Dublin, Bobbie Rosenfeld
- Martin and Beatrice Fischer Award in Fiction: David Bezmozgis, Natasha and Other Stories
- The Yad Vashem Award in Holocaust Memoir: Elaine K Naves, Shoshanna's Story
- The Betty and Morris Aaron, Isaac Frischwasser, Louis L.Lockshin Memorial Prize in Holocaust Literature: Lisa Appignanesi. The Memory Man

=== 2006 ===
- The Canadian Society for Yad Vashem Prize in Holocaust History: Sara Ginaite-Rubinson, Resistance and Survival
- The Jack Chisvin Family Award in Holocaust Memoir: Jack Weiss, Memories, Dreams and Nightmares
- The Nachman Sokol-Chaim Yoel and Mollie Halberstadt Award in Biblical/ Rabbinic Scholarship: Eliezer Segal, From Sermon to Commentary: Expounding the Bible in Talmudic Babylonia
- Abe and Fay Bergel Award in Scholarship on a Jewish Subject: Richarda Menkis and Norman Ravin, The Canadian Jewish Studies Reader
- Abraham and Eve Trapunski Prize in Yiddish Literature and Translation from Yiddish: Mervin Butovsky and Ode Garfinkle, The Journals of Yaacov Zipper 1950-82
- The Isaac Frischwasser - Louis L. Lockshin Memorial Award in Poetry: Renee Norman, True Confessions
- The Louis L. Lockshin and Brenda Freedman Memorial Prize in Poetry: Seymour Mayne, September Rain
- Canadian Jewish News Award in Biography/Memoir: Michael Posner, The Last Honest Man: Mordecai Richler, an Oral Biography
- Frances and Samuel Stein Memorial Award in Youth Literature: Lynne Kositsky, The Thought of High Windows
- Martin and Beatrice Fischer Award in Fiction: Edeet Ravel, A Wall of Light
- Canadian Society for Yad Vashem Award in Holocaust Memoir and Literature: Henia Reinhartz, Bits and Pieces

=== 2007 ===
- The Canadian Society for Yad Vashem Prize in Holocaust History: Rosemary Sullivan, Villa Air-Bel
- The Jack Chisvin Family Award in Holocaust Memoir/Literature: Bernice Eisenstein, I Was a Child of Holocaust Survivors
- Abe and Fay Bergel Award in Scholarship on a Jewish Subject: Michael Wex, Born To Kvetch: Yiddish Language and Culture in All of Its Moods
- Abraham and Eve Trapunski Prize in Yiddish Literature and Translation from Yiddish: Shirley Kumove, Drunk From the Bitter Truth; The Poems of Anna Margolin
- Canadian Jewish News Award in Poetry: Rafi Aaron, Surviving the Censor: The Unspoken Words of Osip Mandelstam
- Frances and Samuel Stein Memorial Award in Youth Literature: Carol Matas, Turned Away: The World War II Diary of Devora Bernstein
- Martin and Beatrice Fischer Award in Fiction: Susan Glickman, The Violin Lover
- Canadian Society for Yad Vashem Award in Holocaust Memoir and Literature: Henia Reinhartz, Bits and Pieces
- The Joseph and Faye Tanenbaum Prize in Biography/Memoir: Eric Koch, I Remember the Location - Exactly

=== 2008 ===
- Joseph and Faye Tanenbaum Prize in History: Anna Porter, Kasztner's Train: The True Story of Rezsö Kasztner, Unknown Hero of the Holocaust
- Abe and Fay Bergel Award in Scholarship on a Jewish Subject: James Diamond, Converts, Heretics, and Lepers: Maimonides and the Outsider
- Abraham and Eve Trapunski Prize in Yiddish Literature and Translation from Yiddish: Marc Miller, Representing the Immigrant Experience: Morris Rosenfeld and the Emergence of Yiddish Literature in America
- Canadian Jewish News Award in Poetry: Ruth Panofsky, Laike and Nahum: A Poem in Two Voices
- Frances and Samuel Stein Memorial Award in Youth Literature: Tina Grimberg, Out of Line: Growing up Soviet
- Martin and Beatrice Fischer Award in Fiction: John Miller, A Sharp Intake of Breath
- Canadian Society for Yad Vashem Award in Holocaust Memoir and Literature: Henia Reinhartz, Bits and Pieces
- Samuel and Rose Cohen Memorial Award in Biography/Memoir: Mayer Kirshenblatt and Barbara Kirshenblatt-Gimblett, They Called Me Mayer July: Painted Memories of a Jewish Childhood in Poland Before the Holocaust

=== 2009 ===
- Biography and Memoir: Peter C. Newman, Izzy: the Passionate Life and Turbulent Times of Izzy Asper, Canada's Media Mogul
- Fiction: Ami Sands Brodoff, The White Space Between
- History: Barrie Wilson, How Jesus Became Christian
- Holocaust Literature: Joseph Kertes, Gratitude
- Poetry: Isa Milman, Prairie Kaddish
- Scholarship on a Jewish Subject: Reinhold Kramer, Mordecai Richler: Leaving St. Urbain
- Yiddish Literature: David G. Roskies, Yiddishlands: A Memoir
- Youth Literature: Kathy Kacer, The Diary of Laura's Twin

=== 2010 ===
- Fiction: Robin McGrath, The Winterhouse
- History: Allan Levine, Coming of Age: A History of the Jewish People of Manitoba
- Holocaust Literature: Michael R. Marrus, Some Measure of Justice: The Holocaust Era Restitution Campaign of the 1990s
- Youth Literature: Eva Wiseman, Puppet
- Biography and Memoir: David Sax, Save the Deli
- Jewish Thought and Culture: Kenneth Sherman, What the Furies Bring
- Scholarship on a Jewish Subject: Jeffrey Veidlinger, Jewish Public Culture in the Late Russian Empire
- Yiddish Literature: Goldie Sigal, Stingy Buzi and King Solomon
- Special Achievement Award: Howard Engel

=== 2011 ===
- Fiction: Alison Pick, Far to Go
- Politics and History: Tarek Fatah, The Jew Is Not My Enemy
- Holocaust Literature: Robert Eli Rubinstein, An Italian Renaissance: Choosing Life in Canada
- Biography and Memoir: Charles Foran, Mordecai: The Life and Times
- Scholarship: Harold Troper, The Defining Decade: Identity, Politics, and the Canadian Jewish Community in the 1960s
- Youth Literature: Judie Oron, Cry of the Giraffe

=== 2012 ===
- Biography: Fraidie Martz and Andrew Wilson, A Fiery Soul: The Life and Theatrical Times of John Hirsch
- Fiction: David Bezmozgis, The Free World
- History: Denis Vaugeois, Les Premiers Juifs d'Amérique 1760-1860: L'extraordinaire histoire de la famille Hart
- Holocaust Literature: Eli Pfefferkorn, The Muselmann at the Water Cooler
- Memoir: Richard Marceau, Juif, Une histoire québécoise
- Poetry: S. Weilbach, Singing from the Darktime: A Childhood Memoir in Poetry and Prose
- Scholarship: Kalman Weiser, Jewish People, Yiddish Nation: Noah Prylucki and the Folkists in Poland
- Yiddish Literature: Rebecca Margolis, Jewish Roots, Canadian Soil: Yiddish Culture in Montreal, 1905-1945
- Youth Literature: Lesley Simpson, Yuvi's Candy Tree

=== 2013 ===
- Biography: Aili and Andres McConnon, Road to Valour: A True Story of World War II Italy, the Nazis, and the Cyclist Who Inspired a Nation (Doubleday)
- Fiction: Nancy Richler, The Imposter Bride (Harper Collins)
- History: Matti Friedman, The Aleppo Codex: A True Story of Obsession, Faith, and the Pursuit of an Ancient Bible (Algonquin Books)
- Holocaust Literature: Julija Šukys, Epistolophilia: Writing the Life of Ona Simaite (University of Nebraska Press)
- Poetry: Isa Milman, Something Small To Carry Home (Quattro Books)
- Scholarship: L. Ruth Klein, Nazi Germany, Canadian Responses: Confronting Antisemitism in the Shadow of War (McGill-Queen's University Press)
- Yiddish: Pierre Anctil, Jacob-Isaac Segal 1869-1954, Un poète yiddish de Montréal et son milieu (Presses de l'Université Laval)
- Children and Youth Literature: Sharon E. McKay, Enemy Territory (Annick Press)

=== 2014 ===
- Holocaust Literature: Ken Setterington, Branded by the Pink Triangle (Second Story Press)
- Fiction: Kenneth Bonert, The Lion Seeker (Knopf Canada)
- Yiddish: Frieda Forman, The Exile Book of Yiddish Women Writers (Exile Editions)
- Jewish Thought and Culture: Josh Lambert, Unclean Lips: Obscenity, Jews, and American Culture (New York University Press)
- Poetry: Anne Michaels, Poetry, and Bernice Eisenstein, Portraits, Correspondences (McClelland and Stewart)
- Scholarship: Albert Kaganovitch, The Long Life and Swift Death of the Jewish Reschitsa (The University of Wisconsin Press)
- Biography/Memoir: Renée Levine Melammed, An Ode to Salonika: The Ladino Verses of Bouena Sarfatty (Indiana University Press)
- Youth: Carol Matas, Dear Canada: Pieces of the Past: The Holocaust Diary of Rose Rabinowitz, Winnipeg, Manitoba, 1948 (Scholastic)
- History: Jeffrey Veidlinger, In the Shadow of the Shtetl (Indiana University Press)

== List of winners of the Canadian Jewish Literary Awards (2015 - 2022) ==
=== 2015 ===
- Novel: Nora Gold, Fields of Exile (Dundurn Press).
- Scholarship: James A. Diamond, Maimonides and the Shaping of the Jewish Canon (Cambridge University Press).
- Biography/Memoir: Alison Pick, Between Gods: A Memoir (Doubleday Canada).
- History: Joseph Hodes, From India to Israel: Identity, Immigration, and the Struggle for Religious Equality (McGill-Queen's University Press).
- Youth Literature: Suri Rosen, Playing with Matches (ECW Press).
- Poetry: Robyn Sarah, My Shoes Are Killing Me (Biblioasis).
- Holocaust Literature: Beverley Chalmers, Birth, Sex and Abuse: Women's Voices Under Nazi Rule (Grosvenor House).
- Short Fiction: Mireille Silcoff, Chez l'Arabe (House of Anansi).
- Yiddish: Ruth Panofsky, The Collected Poems of Miriam Waddington: A Critical Edition (University of Ottawa Press).

=== 2016 ===
- Novel: Sigal Samuel, The Mystics of Mile End (Freehand Books).
- Scholarship: Sarah Phillips Casteel, Calypso Jews: Jewishness in the Caribbean Literary Imagination (Columbia University Press).
- Biography/Memoir: Howard Akler, Men of Action (Doubleday Canada).
- History: Michael Marrus, Lessons of the Holocaust (University of Toronto Press).
- Youth Literature: Anne Dublin, 44 Hours or Strike! (Second Story Press).
- Holocaust Literature: Agata Tuszyńska, A Family History of Fear (Knopf Canada).
- Yiddish: Helen Mintz, translator, Vilna, My Vilna: Stories by Abraham Karpinowitz (Syracuse University Press).
- Jewish Thought and Culture: Julia Creet, Sara R. Horowitz and Amira Bojadzija-Dan, editors, H.G. Adler: Life, Literature, Legacy (Northwestern University Press).

=== 2017 ===
- Novel: Gary Barwin, Yiddish for Pirates (Vintage Canada).
- Scholarship: Joel Hecker, The Zohar: Pritzker Edition, Vol 11 (Stanford University Press).
- Biography/Memoir: Matti Friedman, Pumpkinflowers: A Soldier's Story (Signal/McClelland & Stewart).
- History: Roger Frie, Not In My Family: German Memory and Responsibility After the Holocaust (Oxford University Press).
- Youth Literature: Eva Wiseman, Another Me (Tundra Books).
- Poetry: Stuart Ross, A Sparrow Came Down Resplendent (Wolsak & Wynn).
- Holocaust Literature: Myrna Goldenberg, editor, Before All Memory Is Lost: Women's Voices from the Holocaust (Azrieli Foundation).
- Yiddish: Rachel Seelig, Strangers in Berlin: Modern Jewish Literature Between East and West 1919-1933 (University of Michigan Press).
- Jewish Thought and Culture: Chantal Ringuet and Gérard Rabinovitch, editors, Les révolutions de Leonard Cohen (Presses de l'Université du Québec).

=== 2018 ===
- Fiction: Natalie Morrill, The Ghost Keeper (HarperCollins Patrick Crean Editions).
- Memoir/Biography: Kathy Kacer with Jordana Lebowitz, To Look a Nazi in the Eye: A Teen's Account of a War Criminal Trial (Second Story Press).
- Poetry: Rebecca Păpacaru, The Panic Room (Nightwood Editions).
- Yiddish: Seymour Mayne, In Your Words: Translations from the Yiddish and the Hebrew (Ronald P. Frye & Co).
- Scholarship: Daniel Kupfert Heller, Jabotinsky's Children: Polish Jews and the Rise of Right-Wing Zionism (Princeton University Press).
- History: Pierre Anctil, Histoire des Juifs du Québec (Les éditions du Boréal).
- Holocaust Literature: Max Wallace, In the Name of Humanity: The Secret Deal to End the Holocaust (Allen Lane/PenguinRandom House Canada).
- Children and Youth Fiction: Anne Renaud (author) and Richard Rudnicki (illustrator), Fania's Heart (Second Story Press).

=== 2019 ===
- Fiction: Jennifer Robson, The Gown: A Novel of the Royal Wedding (HarperCollins).
- Memoir: Ayelet Tsabari, The Art of Leaving (Harper/Collins).
- Biography: Alexandra Popoff, Vasily Grossman and the Soviet Century (Yale University Press).
- History: Matti Friedman, Spies of No Country: Behind Enemy Lines at the Birth of the Israeli Secret Service (Signal/McClelland & Stewart).
- Children/Youth: Anne Dublin, A Cage Without Bars (Second Story Press).
- Yiddish: Goldie Morgenthaler, translator, Confessions of a Yiddish Writer and Other Essays by Chava Rosenfarb (McGill-Queen's University Press).
- Scholarship: Michael Kater, Culture in Nazi Germany (Yale University Press).
- Holocaust: Leonard and Edith Ehrlich, Carl S. Ehrlich, editor, Choices Under Duress of the Holocaust: Benjamin Murmelstein and the Fate of Viennese Jewry Volume I: Vienna (Texas Tech University Press).

=== 2020 ===
- Fiction: Abraham Boyarsky, Through Shadows Slow (8th House Publishing).
- Jewish Thought and Culture: Tanhum Yoreh, Waste Not: A Jewish Environmental Ethic (SUNY Press).
- Biography: Hernan Tesler-Mabé, Mahler's Forgotten Conductor: Heinz Unger and His Search for Jewish Meaning, 1895–1965 (Yale University Press).
- History: Derek Penslar, Theodor Herzl: The Charismatic Leader (Yale University Press).
- Children/Youth: Edeet Ravel, A Boy is Not a Bird (Groundwood Books).
- Yiddish: Ilan Stavans and Josh Lambert, editors, How Yiddish Changed America and How America Changed Yiddish (Restless Books).
- Scholarship: David Novak, Athens and Jerusalem: God, Humans, and Nature (University of Toronto Press).
- Poetry: Elana Wolff, Swoon (Guernica Editions).
- Holocaust: Laurent Sagalovitsch, Le Temps des orphelins (Buchet/Chastel).

=== 2021 ===
- Fiction: Gary Barwin, Nothing the Same, Everything Haunted: The Ballad of Motl the Cowboy (Random House Canada).
- Biography: Menachem Kaiser, Plunder: A Memoir of Family Property and Nazi Treasure (Houghton Mifflin Harcourt).
- Poetry: Lisa Richter, Nautilus and Bone (Frontenac House).
- Children and Youth: Sigal Samuel, Osnat and Her Dove (Levine Querido).
- Scholarship: Rebecca Clifford, Survivors: Children's Lives After the Holocaust (Yale University Press).
- Holocaust: Judy Batalion, The Light of Days: The Untold Story of Women Resistance Fighters in Hitler's Ghettos (William Morrow).

=== 2022 ===
- Fiction: Cary Fagan, Great Adventures for the Faint of Heart (Freehand Books).
- Biography/Memoir: Charlotte Schallié, But I Live: Three Stories of Child Survivors of the Holocaust (University of Toronto Press).
- History: Jeffrey Veidlinger, In the Midst of Civilized Europe: The Pogroms of 1918-1921 and the Onset of the Holocaust (HarperCollins Publishers Ltd.).
- Holocaust: Mark Celinscak, Kingdom of Night: Witnesses to the Holocaust (University of Toronto Press).
- Poetry: Adam Sol, Broken Dawn Blessings (ECW Press).
- Scholarship: Gregg E. Gardner, Wealth, Poverty, and Charity in Jewish Antiquity (University of California Press).
- Yiddish: Justin D. Cammy, translator and editor, From the Vilna Ghetto to Nuremberg: Memoir and Testimony by Abraham Sutzkever (McGill-Queen's University Press).
- Youth Literature: Joanne Levy, Sorry for Your Loss (Orca Book Publishers).

=== 2023 ===
- Fiction: Lori Weber, The Ribbon Leaf (Red Deer Press)
- Jewish Thought and Culture: Sara Ronis, Demons in the Details: Demonic Discourse and Rabbinic Culture in Late Antique Babylonia (University of California Press)
- Biography: Moshe Safdie, If Walls Could Speak: My Life in Architecture (Atlantic Monthly Press)
- History: Doris L. Bergen, Between God and Hitler: Military Chaplains in Nazi Germany (Cambridge University Press.)
- Children and Youth: Heather Camlot, The Prisoner and the Writer (Groundwood Books)
- Poetry: Gary Barwin, The Most Charming Creatures (ECW Press)
- Holocaust: Josef Lewkowicz, The Survivor: How I Survived Six Concentration Camps and Became a Nazi Hunter (HarperCollins)
- Scholarship: Derek Sayer, Postcards from Absurdistan: Prague at the End of History, (Princeton University Press)
- Yiddish: Rebecca Margolis, Yiddish Lives On: Strategies of Language Transmission (McGill-Queen's University Press)
- Special Achievement Award: Michael Posner, Leonard Cohen, Untold Stories (Simon & Schuster)
- Special Citation: Simon-Pierre Lacasse, Les Juifs de la Révolution tranquille : regards d'une minorité religieuse sur le Québec de 1945 à 1976 (University of Ottawa Press)

== See also ==
- Vine Awards for Canadian Jewish Literature
- National Jewish Book Award
- List of winners of the National Jewish Book Award
