= Esther Brandeau =

First Jewish settler of Canada

- Born: 1717 or 1718; Saint-Esprit, Bayonne, Labourd, France
- Other name: Jacques La Fargue
- Occupation: Cabin boy
- Years active: 1733–1738
- Known for: First Jewish settler in New France
- Criminal charges: Refusing to convert to Christianity
- Criminal penalty: Deportation

Esther Brandeau (flor. in Canada 1738–39) is notable in the history of the Jews in Canada as the first Jew to set foot in the country, travelling from France to New France.

She was born around 1718, probably at Saint-Esprit-lès-Bayonne (near Bayonne), in the diocese of Dax. Jews in France were subject to waves of expulsion, and women's lives were limited by gender roles, which some tried to evade by cross-dressing. Brandeau reinvented herself as Jacques La Fargue, a Roman Catholic boy, and became a sailor on the St-Michel, a ship bound from Bordeaux for the Port of Quebec. At that time, Canada was the only colony of the New World never reported to have been visited by a Jew.

After a brief masquerade, Esther's religion and sex were both discovered. As a non-Catholic in a legally Catholic country, she was arrested on the orders of Gilles Hocquart, Intendant of New France, and taken to the Hôpital Général in Quebec City. Hocquart was initially under the impression that Brandeau wished to convert to Catholicism and remain in the colony. However, later he wrote to the minister in France that conversion attempts had failed: she desired to live in Canada as a Jew. The government decided on deportation, and after correspondence with authorities in France, she was sent back home on a ship named Comte de Matignon at the expense of the State. After Brandeau's deportation to France, nothing more is known about her life.

== Historical background ==
=== Jews in 18th century Europe and European colonies ===
Historically, anti-Semitism was widespread in Christian Europe and European colonies, with many Jews displaced as a result. In the centuries leading up to the 1700s, European Christians widely associated Jews with unfair economic practices such as usury. Medieval prejudices against Jews, such as poisoning water wells to cause the Black Death, persisted in this era as well. Jews were also a popular subject in literature despite making up less than one percent of the French population, although they were often depicted negatively in these works.

While Jews had reached the Americas centuries before Esther Brandeau, New France was one of the last places that Jews ever set foot in the Americas chronologically as the colony of New France was officially closed to all non-Catholics. In 1492, the year that the Spanish monarchy expelled Jews from its lands, several Jews joined Christopher Columbus's voyage across the Atlantic Ocean. One Jew among this party, Louis de Torres, has been identified as the first white man to walk upon the New World. By the 17th century, several Jews had become sailors, bearing similarity to Esther Brandeau's early life. In 1624 the first "openly Jewish" settlement, located in Brazil, was established in the Americas. In contrast to New France, the English colonies provided a relatively tolerant environment for Jews as early as the 17th century, partially due to the English acquisition of New Netherland where English ruled that Jews would continue to keep the rights that they enjoyed under Dutch rule. Many Jews in the English colonies established themselves as successful military commanders, merchants, or public servants. In 1733, just a few years before Brandeau's secret arrival in New France, a group of openly Jewish settlers had already helped to establish the English colony of Georgia.

=== Women in New France ===
While women had more options for non-domestic activities in New France than in France due to the gender disparity that existed in the colony, a wife was still subject to her husband's wishes. A woman in New France could be expected to be married in her mid-teens (much younger than the average marriage age in France) to a man over a decade older, and the only grounds for separation was that of financial matters. Cases of domestic abuse in New France have been recorded. From a religious perspective, gender roles persisted as men were expected to play a more active religious while women were more revered for their sexual purity. With respect to Brandeau's situation, she was sent to a hospital rather than a jail due to the lack of prison facilities for women in New France.

== Legacy ==
=== Literature ===
Esther's story has inspired novelists, scholars, scriptwriters, and performance artists to create different pieces about her life. Canadian journalist and historian Benjamin G. Sack featured a historical essay about Esther Brandeau in History of the Jews in Canada, translated in 1965. B.G. Sack would later be a credible source for Esther's story and serve as the main reference for her entry in Dictionary of Canadian Biography which lays the foundation of what is known about Esther's life. There are three novels about her: Une Juive en Nouvelle-France (2000) by Pierre Lasry, Esther (2004) by Sharon E. McKay and The Tale-Teller (2012) by Susan Glickman. The first, written in French, tells a fictionalised story of Esther's adventures prior her arrival in New France putting emphasis on her ancestors in order to finally to shed some light on her time in Quebec. The Tale-Teller takes readers through Esther's life as Jacques La Fargue and the obstacles Esther faced because of her race and gender. It focuses on the way Esther breaks the gender, race, and socio-economic status barriers. Sharon E. McKay's Esther (2004) sets the scene of life in 18th century Europe but specifically focuses on the lives of Jews and women. This fictional novel explains the law restrictions Jews faced and how numerous Jews were either forced to convert to Roman Catholicism or converted to escape persecution. Jewish women in Canada lived a constrained life and were expected to take on the traditional roles according to society. Esther Brandeau's story provides a different perspective apart from the societal restrictions Jews and women faced.

==== Performance art ====
Heather Hermant is a poet-scholar who works with video, installation, theatre, and analyzes the crossover between land, body, and archive. Hermant created a piece known as ribcage: this wide passage, based upon the first Jew to set foot into New France. When Heather was assigned to research an ancestor for a performance class, she explored Jewish-Canadian history which led to her discovery of Esther Brandeau's story. Ribcage: this wide passage highlights Esther's experience multi-crossing from a Jewish female passing as a Christian male in the 18th century. The predominant theme of the performance is "multi-crossing" which suggests one who passes across gender, religion, geographies—some of what Esther experienced on her journey to New France. Ribcage: this wide passage not only explores history and the unknown, but also is centered around finding a place of belonging. Hermant's Brandeau inspired work would be presented at Vancouver's 2010 Tremor's Festival, Le MAI in Montreal, and later be converted into a French version as well.

== See also ==
- History of the Jews in Canada
