= Alfred Lilienthal =

American author and political activist

- Born: Alfred M. Lilienthal; December 25, 1913; New York City, New York, United States
- Died: October 6, 2008 (aged 94)
- Occupations: Attorney, writer

Alfred M. Lilienthal (December 25, 1913 – October 6, 2008) was an author, attorney, Middle East expert, and an American Jew, who was a prominent critic of political Zionism and the state of Israel. He was "an eloquent advocate of Judaism as a prophetic religion of universal values" and defended the human rights of the Palestinians.

== Early life ==
New York City-born Lilienthal graduated from Cornell Univeristy with a B.A. in 1934, and then attended Columbia Law School, graduating in 1938 with a law degree, and was admitted to the bar. In 1936 he founded a First Voters League in support of Alf Landon, and in 1939 became vice-chairman of a Provisional Committee for American Youth formed in opposition to the American Youth Congress which the Committee accused of being a communist front. In 1940 he again acted as president of the Republican First Voters League, and became Fusion Party candidate for the New York City Council in 1941. During the Second World War, he worked for the State Department (1942–1943, Division of Defense Materials, and again 1945–1948) and served in the U.S. Army in the Middle East (1943–1945). While based in Egypt, Lilienthal made his first visit to the Holy Land, and was struck by the multi-racial composition of Jerusalem's citizens at that time.

== Foreign policy career ==
In 1945 he was consultant to the U.S. delegation to the United Nations Conference on International Organization at San Francisco. He used this knowledge of the inner workings of the U.N. in his later critical writings on the formation of the state of Israel. From 1947 to 1952 he was counsel to the Washington Chapter of the anti-Zionist American Council for Judaism.

== Israel criticism and related controversies ==
Lilienthal first came to prominence in the early 1950s as a Jewish critic of Zionism and Israel. When Reader's Digest hosted a debate on the Zionist movement, his article "Israel's Flag is Not Mine" warned against charges of dual loyalty that American Jews might receive as a result of Zionism. The specter of the Holocaust also loomed large among Zionists of the time, but Lilienthal wrote this article with an eye toward the Cold War. Anti-Communism was then at its height and Israel's socialist politics, for better or worse, may have been one implied object of his criticism. The publication of the Digest article led to an irreparable split with Herman Wouk, who privately condemned Lilienthal for making his criticism of the Zionist movement public.

Lilienthal maintained that the creation of the State of Israel inflicted great harm to Jews because statehood gives antisemites justification for charging Jews with dual loyalty. Lilienthal denied that Israel is democratic, and asserts that if the foreign aid now given to Israel would have been given instead to Arab countries, these countries would rapidly become democratic societies. He demanded that Zionists renounce their claim on world Jewry, so the State of Israel would be able stand on its own. Lilienthal, along with Noam Chomsky and 500 others, signed a controversial petition supporting French Holocaust denier Robert Faurisson's right to academic freedom and freedom of speech.

Lilienthal also claimed as "anthropological fact" that "many Christians may have much more Hebrew-Israelite blood in their veins than most of their Jewish neighbors."

=== Publications ===
The first of Dr. Lilienthal's books on Zionism and the Palestinian question was What Price Israel (1953), which was published by the Henry Regnery Company with some controversy in the mainstream press. The book offered a brief history of the Zionist movement in Europe and the United States, and analysed the U.N.'s initial vote on the partition of Palestine.

Soon after its publication, Lilienthal traveled to the Middle East and discovered that he had become a celebrity through a pirated Arabic-language edition. Although he never received royalties from its publication, the Arabic edition soon gained Lilienthal access to the leaders of the Arab world; among other contacts, he was the first Jew allowed to travel in Saudi Arabia, in 1955, and was invited to a private meeting with King Ibn Saud.

Lilienthal continued to speak throughout the United States on Middle East issues, and some of his speeches were anthologized in mainstream journals dedicated to political rhetoric. In 1956, he founded and chaired the National Committee for Security and Justice in the Middle East and in 1960 the American Arab Association for Commerce and Industry. In 1969, he was awarded the Juris Doctor degree by Columbia University.

Other publications by Alfred Lilienthal include There Goes the Middle East in 1957, The Other Side of the Coin in 1965, and The Zionist Connection: What Price Peace? in 1978 (an expanded paperback edition being published in 1982 as The Zionist Connection II.) He was a lecturer, TV and Radio commentator, author of magazine articles and syndicated news pieces as well as columnist with the Nashville Banner and the Arizona Daily Star. He even assisted in the photography and editing of a 16mm documentary film, The Turbulent Middle East, for his lecture use.

==== Critiques ====
Alan T. Davies described Lilienthal as "useful" to antisemites because he is Jewish and "opposes the State of Israel on principle."

Manfred Gerstenfeld describes Lilienthal as a "hard core extremist" among anti-Israel activists. In the introduction to his book, The Zionist Connection, Lilienthal praised the UN resolution which equated Zionism with racism and racial discrimination.

In 1965 Senator Jacob Javits described Lilienthal as "a lecturer and journalist whose vehemently anti-Israel views are well known." Lilienthal also wrote for the Washington Report on Middle East Affairs.

According to Oscar Kraines, "Despite its unsubtle partisanship and unrestrained vitriol, [What Price Israel] is a serious, 'angry, provocative' book. It lacks, however, the degree of objectivity which a book should have if it is to be a valuable contribution to the literature on Middle Eastern affairs."
