= Ten Green Bottles (book) =

Book by Vivian Jeanette Kaplan

- Author: Vivian Jeanette Kaplan
- Language: English
- Subject: World War II memoir
- Genre: Non-fiction
- Publisher: St. Martin's Press
- Publication date: 2004
- Pages: 285
- Awards: Canadian Jewish Book Award (Canada), ADEI - WIZO Award (Italy)
- ISBN: 9781466829206

Ten Green Bottles is a book by Vivian Jeanette Kaplan and a play based on the book. It is the story of Kaplan's mother who escaped from Nazi-occupied Vienna to Shanghai under Japanese rule.

The title of the book comes from the song sung by British servicemen stationed in Shanghai. It was published in English in Canada and in the U.S. by St. Martin's Press in 2004 and has been republished in Germany as Von Wien nach Shanghai, Italy as Dieci Bottiglie Verdi, Hungary as Sanghaji Fogsag and China as 十个绿瓶子.

== Plot ==
The book is told from the viewpoint of the author's mother and starts in 1921. Gerda Karpel (referred to always as Nini in the book) is a 5-year-old Jewish girl living in Vienna in 1921. She comes from an upper-middle-class family. The book starts with the birth of Nini's brother, Willi, and chronicles the death of Nini's father shortly after the birth. The book then discusses day-to-day life from the viewpoint of a Jewish girl growing up in Vienna. The book discusses the political instability caused after the assassination of Engelbert Dollfuss and the suppression of democracy.

== Play ==
The premiere of the play was performed in English in Toronto, Canada in 2009. It was produced by Helena Fine of Te-Amim Theatre and written and directed by Mark Cassidy of Threshold Theatre. It starred Sascha Cole (Nini), Daniel Krolik (Poldi), Ginette Mohr (Stella), Nathan Schwartz (Willi) and Lauren Brotman (Erna).

== Reception ==
In Canada it won a Canadian Jewish Book Award and in Italy won the ADEI (Associazione Donne Ebree d'Italia) - WIZO Award.
