= Tina Grimberg =

Canadian Reconstructionist rabbi

Tina Grimberg is a Reconstructionist Rabbi living in Toronto, Ontario, Canada. Since 2008, she has been a leader in the inter-religious dialogue with Muslims and Christians in Ontario. She has been active in the movement against poverty in Canada.

== Youth and early life ==
Grimberg was born in 1963 in Kiev, Ukraine. Her family moved to the United States when she was sixteen, and immediately became involved in the Jewish community of Indianapolis. She developed a passionate interest in the Jewish heritage that was so hard to access in her childhood.

== Rabbinical school ==
Grimberg initially trained and worked as a family therapist specializing in women's issues and domestic violence. (Note: She was awarded diplomas from Butler University and Indiana University.) After she attended the Hebrew Union College’s Jewish Institute of Religion, she received her rabbinic ordination in 2001. Throughout her five years of rabbinical school, she worked as an intern at Congregation Beth Elohim in Brooklyn, New York. In the same time period, she facilitated workshops for interfaith couples at the Jewish Community Center of the Upper West Side.

== Rabbinical life ==
Following her ordination, Grimberg served as assistant rabbi at Congregation Beth Elohim in New York City. Later, Rabbi Grimberg married Moshe Shizgal, a Canadian, and they moved to Canada. Since 2002 she has served as rabbi for Congregation Darchei Noam, the Reconstructionist synagogue of Toronto.

In 2006–2007, she introduced a campaign against the violence against women in the Jewish community in partnership with Jewish Family & Child Service in Toronto and Jewish Women International of Canada. In 2008, she became a member of Interfaith Social Assistance Reform Coalition (ISARC). In March 2009, she participated in a multifaith prayer vigil in front of the Ontario parliament, in solidarity with the poor of Toronto. On November 18, 2010, the ISARC Forum drew 75 religious leaders on current strategies to counter poverty. This event attracted several Christians, Muslims and Jews of the regions of Oshawa, Toronto and Ottawa.

== Writing ==
Grimberg's book, Out of Line Growing Up Soviet was published by Tundra Books in October 2007. This autobiographical work presents a view of the life of a young Jewish girl growing up with her family in Kiev in the 1960s and 1970s. The book won numerous awards in Canada, including the Frances and Samuel Stein Memorial Award in Youth Literature and the Bronze Award for Book of the Year from Foreword Magazine.
