= Rachel Korn =

Canadian Yiddish poet and author (1898-1982)

- רחל קאָרן
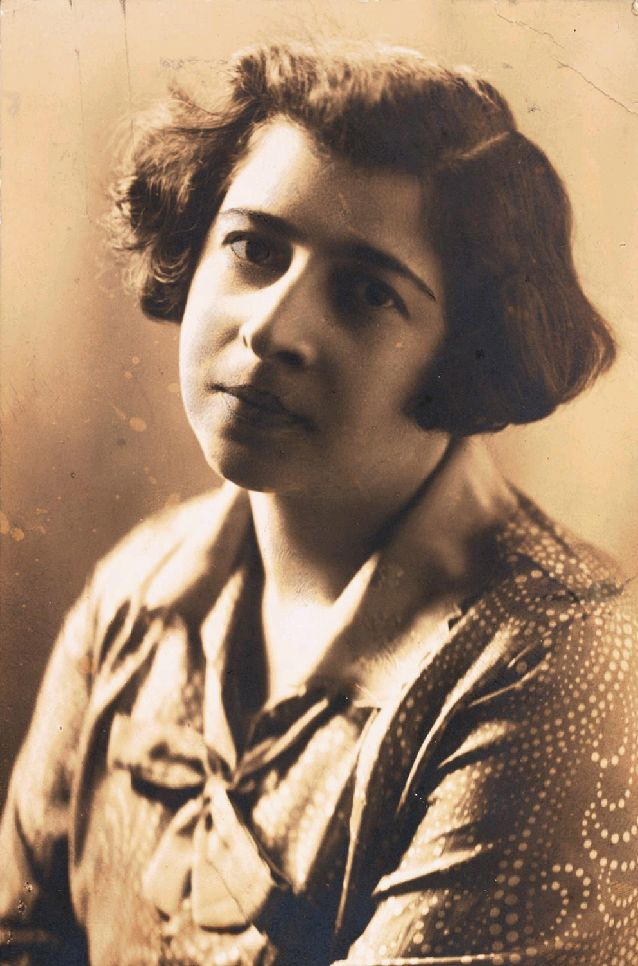
- Rachel Korn, c. 1930
- Born: January 15, 1898; Galicia, Austria-Hungary
- Died: September 9, 1982 (aged 84); Montreal, Quebec, Canada
- Writing career
- Language: Yiddish

Rachel (Rokhl) Häring Korn (Yiddish: רחל קאָרן, 15 January 1898 – 9 September 1982) was a Polish-born Canadian Yiddish language poet and author. In total, she published eight collections of poetry and two of prose. Seymour Mayne characterized her in 1985, three years after her death, as "the first major woman poet in Canadian literature."

== Biography ==
Korn was born in eastern Galicia on a farming estate near Pidlisky (now in Ukraine), and started writing poetry at an early age.

At the start of the First World War, her family fled to Vienna, returning to Poland in 1918. It was in this year that Korn's first published works appeared, in Nowy Dziennik, a Zionist newspaper, and in Głos Przemyski, a socialist journal. These items were published in Polish, but a year later she published her first Yiddish poem in the Lemberger Tageblatt. Her recognition grew with the publication of her first volumes of poetry: Dorf (Village, 1928) and Royter mon (Red Poppies, 1937). Her first collection of prose, Erd (Land), was published in 1936.

Korn was in Białystok when the German invasion of the Soviet Union took place in June 1941; she was evacuated by Soviet authorities to Uzbekistan along with other prominent Jewish writers. She eventually relocated to Moscow, where she remained until the end of the war. She returned to Poland in 1946, immigrating to Montreal, Canada in 1948.

In Canada she emerged as one of the top Yiddish poets of the postwar era. Korn's fourth collection of poetry, Heym un heymlozikayt (Home and Homelessness), was published in 1948. She remained in Montreal, writing poetry, until her death in 1982.

== Awards ==
- Louis Lamed Prize for poetry and prose (1950 and 1958)
- Jewish Book Council of America Certificate of Honor and Award for Yiddish Poetry (1969)
- The H. Leivick Prize (1972)
- The Itzik Manger Prize of the State of Israel (1974)
