= Rebecca Clifford =

Canadian historian

Rebecca A. Clifford
- Born: Kingston, Ontario
- Education: University of Oxford
- Occupation: Professor of history
- Known for: Holocaust memory studies
- Notable work: Survivors: Children's Lives After the Holocaust

Rebecca Clifford (born June 16, 1974) is a Canadian historian and professor of history, focusing on contemporary European history, oral history, memory, and Holocaust historiography. Her 2020 book, Survivors (Yale Press), was won the 2021 Canadian Jewish Literary Award for Scholarship and has been nominated for a number of awards including the Cundill History Prize, the Wingate Prize, and the Wolfson History Prize.

== Biography ==
Clifford was born in Kingston, Ontario and studied at McGill University and Queen's University, before receiving a master's from the University of Toronto in 2001. She attended Oxford and receiving her DPhil in 2008, focusing on the development of Holocaust commemoration in postwar France and Italy. A fellow of the Royal Historical Society, she held a junior research fellowship at Worcester College before joining the faculty at Swansea University in 2009. She became a professor of European and transnational history at Durham University in the fall of 2021.

Her first book, Commemorating the Holocaust: The Dilemmas of Remembrance in France and Italy, was published by Oxford University Press in 2013. It discussed the ways in which Holocaust memoralization had evolved rapidly; before 1993 no European country had an official ceremonial response to the Nazi destruction of Jews and other populations, whereas the next decade saw a promulgation of these ceremonies. Clifford compared how the purpose and outcome of these official memorial days varied between France (July 16, the anniversary of the Vel' d'Hiv Roundup) and Italy (January 27, in line with the United Nations' International Holocaust Remembrance Day). When Jacques Chirac stated France had a 'duty of remembrance', this resulted in a centralized memorial ceremony, which served as a dedicated forum to acknowledge the historical responsibility of the French in their persecution of French Jews, and, simultaneously, the French commitment to the principles of democracy, tolerance, and humanism. However the Italian response was sharply criticized in the book; Clifford calls the Italian politicians' acknowledgement of the Holocaust and Fascist crimes against Italian Jews "opportunistic" and "self-serving".

The book also rebukes the popular misconception that the creation of these state-sponsored Holocaust memorials and commemoration activities were the results of governments caving to 'Jewish pressure'. Rather, Clifford's evidence shows the neither the Jewish communities nor the states were the main agents of change, and that both were relatively latecomers to the grass-roots activist networks of public intellectuals, Holocaust survivors, historians, religious leaders, children of deportees, and others who built a bottom-up movement for the institutionalized of the official Holocaust memory within a country. The book focused on why and how these memorials took shape at the time they did, or in the words of Professor Laura Jockusch, "the intricate ways in which the past was invoked in the public sphere to serve the needs of the present".

In 2013, Clifford was one of the co-authors of Europe’s 1968: Voices of Revolt, in collaboration with thirteen other historians focusing on the history of activism from 1960 to 1970 in Europe. The book was based on roughly 500 interviews with former activists from 14 different countries. The focus of this research project was both the advent of many of the different protest movements, such as workers' protest, religious activism, second-wave feminism, and other areas of activism, and the long-term repercussions of the individuals and communities who participated in these movements.

Her third book, Survivors: Children's Lives After the Holocaust, focused on 100 of the Jewish child survivors of the Holocaust using interviews and archival materials, including letters, photographs, care agency files, psychiatric reports, and unpublished memoirs, from 1945 to the present. In addition to the individual survivors, Clifford also focuses on post-war caretakers of the traumatized children, such as Judith Hemmendinger, who managed the care of children rescued from Kinderblock 66 at the Buchenwald concentration camp.
