= Roger Nash =

Canadian philosopher and poet

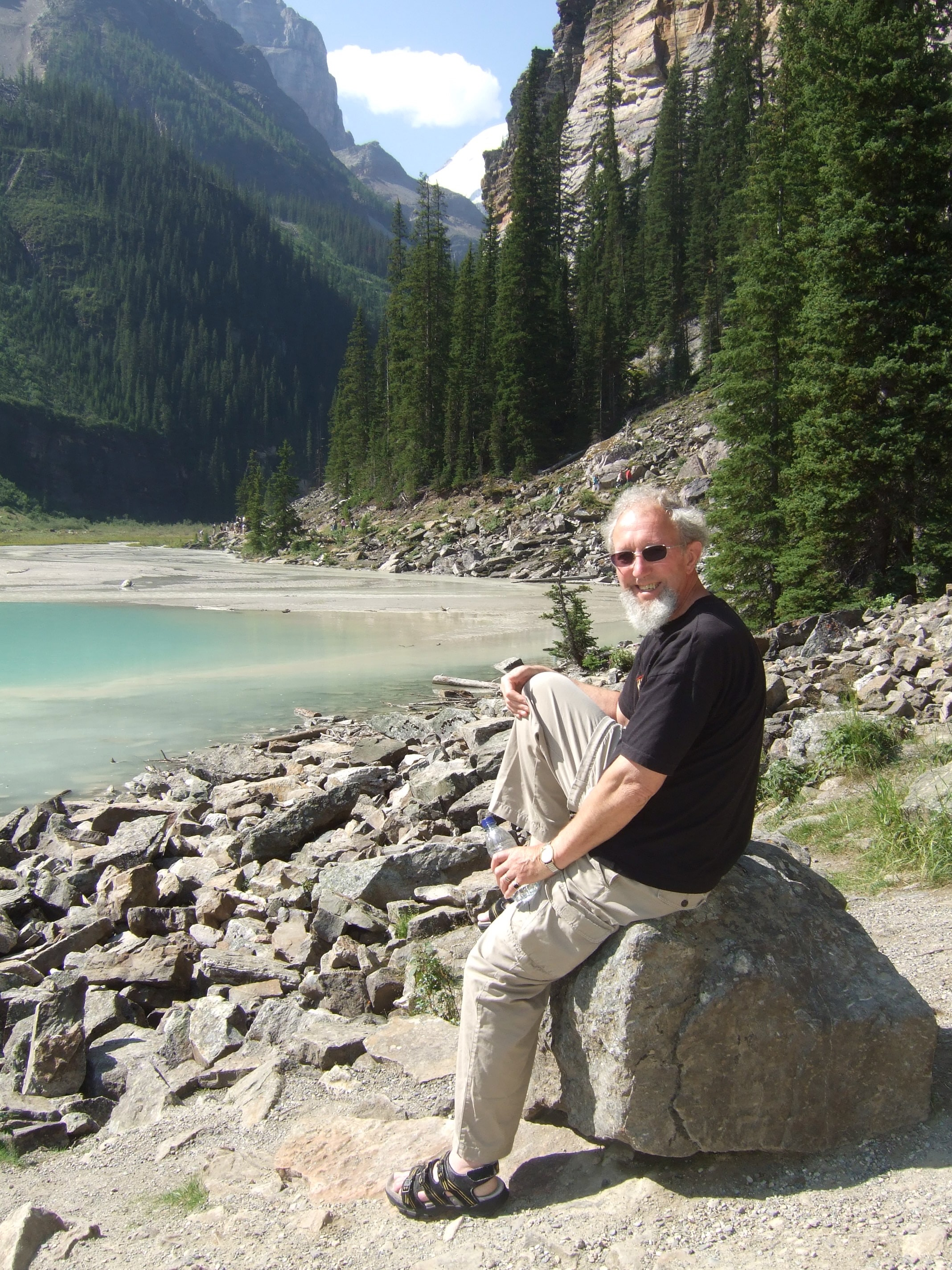

Roger Nash is a Canadian philosopher and poet. He was born in England. He has a B.A. from the University of Wales (1965), an M.A. from McMaster University (1966) and a Ph.D. from the University of Exeter (1974).

Roger Nash is a professor emeritus in the Department of Philosophy at Laurentian University in Sudbury, Ontario. He served as chair of the Department of Philosophy, and director of the interdisciplinary humanities masters programme at Laurentian University, and was a founding member of the graduate diploma in science communication offered by Laurentian University and Science North.

He served as the first poet laureate of the city of Greater Sudbury from 2010 to 2011. He was also president of the League of Canadian Poets from 1998 to 2000. During his tenure as president, he worked with Senator Jerry Grafstein to help create the position of Canadian Poet Laureate.

He was cantor at the Shaar Hashomayim Synagogue in Sudbury where he lived from 1970 through 2024. He now lives in Burnaby, British Columbia and remains active in community organizing, writing and promoting the arts.

== Awards ==
- Prism International Poetry Contest, first prize, 1985/86.
- The Fiddlehead Writing Contest, first prize, poetry, 1993–94.
- Canadian Jewish Book Award, Poetry, 1997.
- Confederation Poets Award, Arc Magazine, 1997 for Circumstantial Evidence of the Visitation of Angels.
- PEN/O.Henry Short Story Prize finalist for "The Camera and the Cobra," anthologized in the PEN/O.Henry Prize Stories 2009 (Anchor Books, New York, 2009).
- Professor Emeritus, Laurentian University, 2009.
- Appointed First Poet Laureate of the City of Greater Sudbury, appointed by Mayor and Council, 2010.
- Mayor's Celebration of the Arts, City of Greater Sudbury, “Award for Exceptional Achievement in the Arts”, 2017

== Books ==
- When? Wet Ink Publishing, Ontario, 2025, 96 pp.
- World of Difference, Black Moss Press, Windsor, Ontario, 2023, 87 pp.
- The Pollen of Strange Alphabet, Pebble Ridge Press, Sudbury – Ottawa, Ontario, 2023, 93 pp.
- Climbing a Question, Toronto, Aeolus House, imprint of Quattro Books Inc., 2019, 97pp.
- Whazzat?, Latitude 46, Sudbury, Ontario, 2017, 75 pp.
- Zigzags, Black Moss Press, (in the Palm Poet Series) Windsor, Ontario, 2016, 82 pp.
- Upsidoon, Your Schrivner Press (2014)
- The Camera and the Cobra, Your Schrivner Press (2012)
- Sound of Sunlight, Buschekbooks, (2012)
- Something Blue and Flying Upward: New and Selected Poems Your Scrivener Press (2006)
- The Poetry of Prayer, 2nd, expanded edition, Harleston, UK: Edgeways Books, 2004
- Once I was a Wheelbarrow, Calgary, AB: Bayeux Arts, 2000, 86p.
- Licking Honey Off A Thorn. North Bay: League of Canadian Poets and Catchfire Press, 48p. 1998
- Northern Prospects: An Anthology of Northeastern Ontario Poetry. Sudbury: Your Scrivener Press, 1998, 120 pp.
- Spring-Fever. Sudbury/Toronto: Your Scrivener Press/ League of Canadian Poets, 42p. 1997
- Uncivilizing. Toronto: Insomniac Press, 1997, 125p. Nash, R., Davidson, C. Dunn, S,. Lever, B. Reaney, J. and Sward, R.
- In the Kosher Chow Mein Restaurant. Sudbury, ON: Your Scrivener Press, 1996.
- The Poetry of Prayer. Norfolk, EN: Brynmill Press. 60p., 1994.
- Ethics, Science, Technology and the Environment: A Reader. Athabasca University Press, 1993.
- Ethics, Science, Technology and the Environment: A Study Guide. Athabasca University Press, 1993.
- Night Flying. Fredericton: Fiddlehead Poetry Books—Goose Lane Editions, 83p., 1990
- Psalms From The Suburbs. Kingston: Quarry Press, 73p., 1986
- Settlement In A School of Whales. Fredericton: Fiddlehead Poetry Books, 55p., 1983
