= Morton Weinfeld =

Canadian sociologist

- Born: 1949 (age 76–77); Montreal, Quebec, Canada
- Spouse: Phyllis Zelkowitz
- Awards: Canadian Jewish Book Award (1990, 2002); Marshall Sklare Award (2013)

Academic background
- Education: Harvard University
- Thesis: Determinants of Ethnic Identification of Slavs, Jews, and Italians in Toronto (1977)
- Doctoral advisor: Nathan Glazer

Academic work
- Discipline: Sociology
- Sub-discipline: Sociology of Jewry
- Institutions: McGill University

Morton Irwin Weinfeld (born 1949) is a Canadian sociologist, who has conducted studies on Canadian Jewry. He is chair in Canadian ethnic studies and former chairman of the sociology department at McGill University.

Weinfeld was born to Polish Jewish Holocaust survivors and raised in Montreal.

== Partial bibliography ==
- Like Everyone Else... but Different: The Paradoxical Success of Canadian Jews. Toronto: McClelland & Stewart. 2001.
- Still Moving: Recent Jewish Migration in Comparative Perspective. New Brunswick, N.J. & London: Transaction. 2000. With Daniel Elazar.
- Ethnicity, Politics, and Public Policy. Toronto: University of Toronto Press. 1999. With Harold Troper.
- Who Speaks for Canada. Toronto: McClelland & Stewart. 1998. With Desmond Morton.
- The Jews in Canada. Toronto: Oxford University Press. 1993. Edited with Robert Brym and William Shaffir.
- Trauma and Rebirth: Intergenerational Effects of the Holocaust. New York: Praeger Press. 1989. With John J. Sigal.
- Old Wounds: Jews, Ukrainians and the Hunt for Nazi War Criminals in Canada. Viking/Penguin. 1988. With Harold Troper.
- The Canadian Jewish Mosaic. Rexdale, Ontario: John Wiley & Sons. 1981. ISBN 9780471799290. With William Shaffir and Irwin Cotler.
