= Ibolya Grossman =

Hungarian-born Canadian writer

Ibolya Grossman (December 11, 1916 – 2005) was a Hungarian-born Canadian writer.

== Biography ==
The daughter of Ignacz Szalai and Laura Fisher, she was born Ibolya Szalai in Pécs. Around 1931, she joined the Zionist movement in Hungary; there, she met Zoltan Rechnitzer ("Zolti"), who she would later marry. In 1933, she moved to Budapest where her older sister lived; for several months, she worked at a thread factory. The Rechnitzer family moved to Budapest in 1936 and she married Zolti in September 1939. She became pregnant in 1941 and a son Andras (Andy) was born in July 1942. In November 1942, Zolti reported for duty as a labourer in the Hungarian army as was required for all Jewish males between the ages of 18 and 50. In May 1944, Zolti was taken to a labour camp; she never saw him again. In the meantime, she was confined to a Jewish ghetto in Budapest.

In July 1944, her parents and two half-sisters were taken to Auschwitz. In 1945, Grossman was liberated from the ghetto by the invading Russian army. In 1949, she attempted to escape from Hungary. She was betrayed, arrested and jailed. Her second attempt succeeded and she came to Toronto in Canada in 1957. In 1958, she married Emil Grossman.

Grossman died in Toronto from cancer.

== Awards ==
Her memoir An Ordinary Woman in Extraordinary Times (1990) received a Canadian Jewish Book Award.
