= Eva Brewster =

Canadian writer (1922–2004)

Eva Brewster (December 28, 1922 – December 3, 2004) was a German-born Canadian writer.

The daughter of wealthy Jewish parents, she was born Eva Levy in Berlin. The Nazis seized her father's business in 1938; he died the following day. Levy married Freddy Raphael in 1939; the couple had a daughter Reha. Raphael was arrested while serving in the German resistance. In April 1943, with her husband, daughter and mother, she was sent to the Auschwitz concentration camp. Her husband and daughter died there. When the survivors were liberated, she helped the British track down escaping Nazis. In 1947, she married a British officer Ross Brewster.

After completing training as a veterinarian, her husband served with the British government in Africa. In 1962, the family settled in southern England, later moving to Scotland, where they took over the operation of her husband's family's farm. They moved again to Alberta, Canada, living first in Edmonton and then, in 1970, in Coutts. Her husband worked there as a veterinary inspector. She began writing a weekly column for the Lethbridge Herald. She also contributed to various magazines, lectured on journalism at the Lethbridge Community College and served as deputy mayor of Coutts from 1986 to 1995.

In 1984, she published Vanished in Darkness; an Auschwitz Memoir. Brewster published a revised version Progeny of Light; Vanished in Darkness in 1994; it received a Canadian Jewish Book Award.

Her story was presented in a 2007 exhibit "Auschwitz: the Eva Brewster Story" at the Galt Museum in Lethbridge.
