= Karen Shenfeld =

Canadian writer

Karen Shenfeld is a writer and film-maker living in Toronto, Canada.

The daughter of Louis Shenfeld and Margaret Parker, she was born in the Bathurst Manor neighbourhood of Toronto. Shenfeld received a B.A. in English literature from York University.

In 1999, she published a collection of poetry The Law of Return which won a Canadian Jewish Book Award. It was followed by The Fertile Crescent in 2005 and My Father's Hands Spoke in Yiddish in 2010. Shenfeld's poetry has been included in poetry readings on CBC Radio. In 2010, she participated in the first Festival Internacional de Literatura, held in Mexico. Her work has been included in anthologies and literary journals in Canada, the United States, the United Kingdom, South Africa and Bangladesh.

Shenfeld wrote and produced the 2001 documentary Il Giardino, The Gardens of Little Italy.

She is married to Stephen Watson, a mathematician. The couple live in the Little Italy district.
