= Rachel Feldhay Brenner =

American college professor (1946–2021)

- Born: 1946; Zabrze, Poland
- Died: February 4, 2021 (aged 74–75); Madison, Wisconsin
- Occupations: College professor, writer, scholar

Rachel Feldhay Brenner (1946 – February 4, 2021) was a Polish-born college professor, writer, and scholar of Jewish literature. She was president of the Association for Israel Studies from 2007 to 2009. Brenner passed following a brief battle with cancer.

== Early life and education ==
Rachel Feldhay was born in Zabrze, Poland, the daughter of Michael Feldhay and Helena Feldhay. She moved to Israel with her family in 1956. She earned a bachelor's degree at Hebrew University, a master's degree at Tel Aviv University, and a PhD at York University.

== Career ==
Brenner joined the faculty of the University of Wisconsin in 1992, in the Department of Hebrew and Semitic Studies. She chaired the department from 2004 to 2007. She was a senior fellow at the Institute for Research in the Humanities, a fellow at the United States Holocaust Memorial Museum, and president of the Association for Israel Studies from 2007 to 2009. She served on the board of the Polish Institute of Arts and Sciences of America (PIASA). "It is my belief," she explained of her work, "that literature affects human consciousness and effects change in social practices, yet its impact is imperceptible, often delayed, and hard to measure."

== Publications ==
Brenner published seven books, and more than 80 articles in academic journals including Modern Judaism, Comparative Literature Studies, Studies in American Jewish Literature, Israel Studies, Slavic Review, AJS Review, Jewish Studies Quarterly, Discourse, Studies in Religion, Holocaust and Genocide Studies, and Critical Inquiry. In 1992 she won the Canadian Jewish Book Award for literary criticism.

=== Books ===
- Assimilation and Assertion: The Response to the Holocaust in Mordecai Richler’s Writing (1989)
- A.M. Klein, The Father of Canadian Jewish Literature: Essays in the Poetics of Humanistic Passion (1990)
- Writing as Resistance: Four Women Confronting the Holocaust: Edith Stein, Simone Weil, Anne Frank, and Etty Hillesum (1997)
- Inextricably Bonded—Israel Jewish and Arab Writers Re-Visioning Culture (2003)
- The Freedom to Write: The Woman-Artist and the World in Ruth Almog’s Fiction (2008, in Hebrew)
- The Ethics of Witnessing: The Holocaust in Polish Writers’ Diaries from Warsaw, 1939-1945 (2014)
- Polish Literature and the Holocaust: Eyewitness Testimonies, 1942–1947 (2019)

=== Selected articles ===
- "A. M. Klein's 'The Hitleriad': Against the Silence of the Apocalypse" (1990)
- "Edith Stein: A reading of her feminist thought" (1994)
- "Between Identity and Anonymity: Art and History in Aharon Megged's Foiglman" (1995)
- "Back to the Future: Evolution of the A/Teleological in Recent Israeli Fiction" (1996)
- "Writing Herself against History: Anne Frank's Self-Portrait as a Young Artist" (1996)
- "Mother's Curse or Cursed Mother: Forgotten Stories in Forbidden Languages in Meir Shalev's Esau" (1997)
- "'Hidden Transcripts' Made Public: Israeli Arab Fiction and Its Reception" (1999)
- "The Search for Identity in Israeli Arab Fiction: Atallah Mansour, Emile Habiby, and Anton Shammas" (2001)
- "Voices from Destruction: Two Eyewitness Testimonies from the Stanisławów Ghetto" (2008)
- "Ideology and Its Ethics: Maria Dąbrowska’s Jewish (and Polish) Problem" (2011)

== Personal life and legacy ==
Brenner died from cancer in 2021, aged 74 years, in Madison, Wisconsin. The Rachel Feldhay Brenner Award in Polish-Jewish Studies was founded in 2021, in her memory, by the PIASA.
