= Chantal Ringuet =

Canadian scholar, author and translator

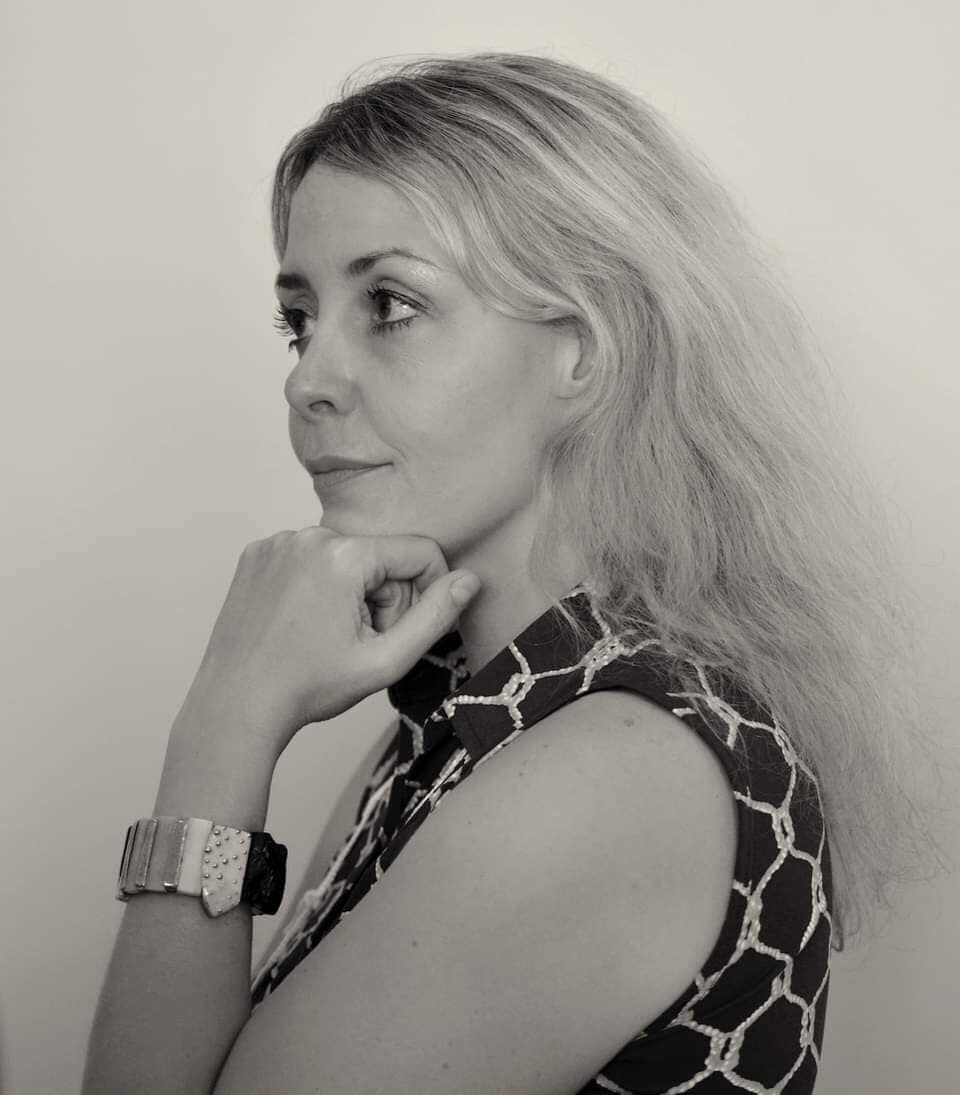
Chantal Ringuet in 2019

Chantal Ringuet (born in Quebec City) is a Canadian scholar, award-winning author and translator.

== Biography ==
After completing a Ph.D. in literary studies (2007, UQÀM, Honourable Mention), Ringuet has been a postdoctoral Fellow in Canadian studies at the University of Ottawa (2007-8) and earned a master's degree in International Management at l'ÉNAP (2009). Since 2014, she has been a Fellow at YIVO, the Institute for Jewish Studies in New York, scholar-in-residence at the Hadassah-Brandeis Institute in Boston and translator-in-residence at the Banff Center for the Arts and Creativity, research associate at Concordia University's Institute for Canadian Jewish Studies (Montreal) and lecturer at the Institut européen Emmanuel Lévinas (AIU) in Paris. In Winter 2019, she was writer-in-residence (visiting scholar) at the Schusterman Center for Israel Studies at Brandeis University. She is the first writer to stay in the Gröndalshause Literature City Residence in Reykjavik UNESCO City of Literature (October 2019).

She was 2024 Mordecai Richler Writer in Residence at the Département des littératures de langue française (formerly DLTC), McGill University. In 2025, she developed, in collaboration with the Université de Montréal and the Société de transport de Montréal, Montreal, City of Women, the fourth iteration of Rebecca Solnit and Joshua Jelly-Shapiro's City of Women project, which revisits the cartography of the Montreal metro through the trajectories of influential women and examines how cities narrate themselves through absent or marginalized voices.

Her research and creative writing stands at the intersection of literature and visual arts, Women's studies, Jewish studies and translation studies. Focusing on the preservation and transmission of the collective memory and the Jewish heritage worldwide, Ringuet acts as a "cultural translator" of the diverse forms of Jewish civilization and identity. She has contributed to many art exhibition catalogues and translated literary works focusing on the cultural hybridity pervading contemporary artistic practices, and on the intergenerational transmission of trauma in the aftermath of the Second World War and the Holocaust. She translates from Yiddish and English to French.

Her first poetry book, Le sang des ruines (Écrits des Hautes-terres, Gatineau, 2010) focuses on two narrative voices of Holocaust survivors; it was awarded the prix littéraire Jacques-Poirier in 2009. Her second collection of poetry, Under the Skin of War (BuschekBooks, Ottawa, 2014) (written both in French and English), was inspired by the British photojournalist Don McCullin. Ringuet is also the author of À la découverte du Montréal yiddish (Éditions Fides, 2011) and she edited the first anthology of Canadian Yiddish literature in French translation, Voix yiddish de Montréal (Moebius, no 139, Montreal, 2013). With Gérard Rabinovitch, she has published Les révolutions de Leonard Cohen (PUQ, 2016), which received a 2017 Canadian Jewish Literary Award. With Pierre Anctil, she has published a translation of the early biography of Marc Chagall (Mon univers. Autobiographie, Fides, 2017), launched for the opening of the international exhibition Chagall : Colour and Music at the Montreal Museum of Fine Arts, the biggest Canadian exhibition devoted to Marc Chagall.

According to Simone Grossman, professor at the Department of French language and culture at Bar-Ilan University, her poetry illustrates the power of "affiliative postmemory" (Marianne Hirsch) through the relation between image and text.

She has participated in many cultural and academic events, including at Harvard University, Yale University, the École des hautes études en sciences sociales (EHESS) and the Hebrew University of Jerusalem; and was guest lecturer at the University of London, the Université Sorbonne Nouvelle-Paris 3, the Toronto Jewish Literary Festival, KlezKanada, the Montreal Museum of Fine Arts, the Blue Metropolis and the Massachusetts Poetry Festival.

== Bibliography ==
=== Books ===
- Sans toi, jusqu'à la cime des arbres, Mercin et Vaux, Éditions L'Ail des ours, 2025. Photographies: Didier Goupy
- The Song of Odessa. Le chant d'Odessa. Der lid fun Odes, livre d'artiste, Montréal, Atelier-Galerie Piroir, 2024.
- Three Conversations. Trois entretiens. Mishtik.u Aimu, Artist's book about Jean-Paul Riopelle, Dialogues Riopelle, Atelier-Galerie A. Piroir, Montréal, June 2023. With poets Chantal Ringuet, Joséphine Bacon and Hélène Dorion and visual artists Peter Krausz, Catherine Farish, Olivier Bodart, Peter Krauz, Jamasee Pitseolak and Monique Martin. Finalist, Prix Jean-Marie Gauvreau 2024.
- Forêt en chambre, Montréal, Éditions du Noroît, 2022. Photographies: Marc-André Foisy.
- Alys Robi a été formidable, Montréal, Québec Amérique, 2021.
- Leonard Cohen, "Chanteurs poètes", Paris, Plon, collection Fidelio [archive], 2021.
- Duetto Leonard Cohen, Paris, Nouvelles lectures, 2019.
- Leonard Cohen (John Zeppetelli, Victor Shiffman, Sylvie Simmons, Chantal Ringuet), exhibition catalogue, Montreal, Musée d'art contemporain de Montréal, 2018.
- Un pays où la terre se fragmente. Carnets de Jérusalem, Montréal, Linda Leith Éditions, 2017.
- Les révolutions de Leonard Cohen (co-edited with Gérard Rabinovitch), Québec, Presses de l'Université du Québec, 2016.
- Under the Skin of War, poetry (Inspired by the photographs of Don McCullin), Ottawa, BuschekBooks, 2014.
- Voix yiddish de Montréal, anthology, Montreal, Moebius, no 139. Preface from Lazer Lederhendler, 2013.
- À la découverte du Montréal yiddish, essay, Montreal, Fides. Preface from Sherry Simon, 2011.
- Le sang des ruines, poetry, Gatineau, Écrits des hautes terres, coll. Cimes, 2010.
- (co-edited with Daniel Chartier and Véronique Pepin), Littérature, immigration et imaginaire au Québec et en Amérique du Nord, Paris, L'Harmattan, coll. «Études transnationales, francophones et comparées», 2006.

=== Translations ===
- Portrait d'un scandale. Le procès d'avortement de Robert Notman, translation of Elaine Kalman Naves (Portrait of a Scandal. The Abortion Trail of Robert Notman), Montréal, Fides, 2017.
- Shoshanna. Mère et fille dans les ténèbres de l'histoire, translation of Elaine Kalman Naves (Shoshanna's Story. A Mother, a Daughter and the Shadows of History), Montréal, Alias (Groupe Nota Bene), 2017.
- Mon univers. Autobiographie, translation (with Pierre Anctil) from Yiddish to French of Marc Chagall's Autobiography, Montreal, Fides, 2017.
- Les échos de la mémoire. Une enfance palestinienne à Jérusalem, translation of Issa J. Boullata (The Bells of Memory. A Palestinian Boyhood in Jerusalem), Montréal, Mémoire d'encrier, 2015.
- Momento. Morceaux de vie, translation of George S. Zimbel, (Momento. A Book of Moments), London, Black Dog Publishing, 2015.
- Forme et lumière. Le musée Aga Khan, translation of (Pattern and Light. The Aga Khan Museum), New York, Skira Rizzoli Publications, Inc., 2014.
- Voix yiddish de Montréal, (selected texts), Montréal, Moebius, no 139. Preface from Lazer Lederhendler. 2013.
- Légendes de Vancouver, translation of E. Pauline Johnson (Legends of Vancouver), Boucherville, Presses de Bras-d'Apic, 2012.

=== Prefaces ===
- Un poète yiddish traverse l'Atlantique dans Sholem Shtern, Voyage au Canada, Montréal, Éditions du Noroît, 2018.
- Un beau ténébreux chez les nevi'im dans Leonard Cohen. Seul l'amour de Jacques Julien, Montreal, Triptyque, 2014.
- Une dame victorienne et une princesse Mohawk dans Légendes de Vancouver (Legends of Vancouver) de E. Pauline Johnson, Boucherville, Presses de Bras-d'Apic, 2012.

=== Articles (selection) ===
- "When translation Becomes Homage", Words Without Borders (The online magazine for International Literature), Essays, April 18, 2018.
- "Leonard Cohen. 10 key Moments", Leonard Cohen. A Crack in Everything (exhibition catalogue), Musée d'art contemporain, Montreal, 2018.
- "Divided Land, Fractured Souls", Lines, Banff Centre Winter Writers' Retreat Chapbook, Winter 2017, p. 18-19. (published under the name Chantal Ringer.

== List of honours ==
=== Awards ===
- Canadian Jewish Literary Award, 2017, category "Jewish Thought and Culture"
- Prix littéraire Jacques-Poirier 2009

=== Grants ===
- Doctoral grant, Fonds de recherche du Québec - Société et culture (FRQSC), 2003-2005
- Postdoctoral grant, Social Sciences and Humanities Research Council (SSHRC), 2007-2008
- Grants for Professional Writers - Creative Writing Program, Canada Council for the Arts, 2015-2022.
- Dina Abramowicz Emerging Scholar Fellowship 2015-2016, Max Weinreich Center, YIVO (Institute for Jewish Research), New York
- International residency grant, Canada Council for the Arts, 2019

=== Residences ===
- Scholar-in-residence, Hadassah-Brandeis Institute, Brandeis University, Waltham/Boston, Massachusetts, 2016
- Writer-in-residence (Winter Writer's Retreat), Banff Center for Arts and Creativity, February 2017
- Translator in residence, Banff International Literary Centre (BILTC), June 2017
- Writer-in-Residence, Schusterman Center for Israel Studies, Brandeis University, 2019
- Reykjavik UNESCO City of Literature Residence (inauguration), October 2019.

== Human rights involvement ==
On September 20, 2015, Ringuet has participated in the 2015 Rock'n'Roll Marathon Oasis de Montreal in order to raise funds for the Montreal Holocaust Memorial Center. She has run in the memory of French writer and resistant Charlotte Delbo, and in the memory of all Jewish intellectuals who were deported in the concentration camps during World War II.
