= Isa Milman =

German-born Canadian writer and visual artist (born 1949)

Isa Milman (born 1949) is a German-born Canadian writer and visual artist living in British Columbia.

The daughter of Holocaust survivors, she was born in a displaced persons camp in Germany. Milman came to Boston with her parents and studied at Tufts University in its Boston School of Occupational Therapy, graduating in 1971. She came to Canada in 1975. She received a master's degree in rehabilitation science from McGill University and taught occupational therapy there. She later moved to Victoria, where she worked at the Epilepsy and Parkinson's Centre.

Her poetry collections Between the Doorposts, Prairie Kaddish and Something Small to Carry Home each received a Canadian Jewish Book Award. Milman's work has been included in various literary magazines and anthologies.
