= John Miller (writer) =

Canadian writer and consultant (born 1968)

John Miller (born March 10, 1968, in Toronto, Ontario) is a Canadian writer and consultant. He has published two novels to date, and his second novel won the Martin and Beatrice Fischer Award for Fiction from the Canadian Jewish Book Awards in 2008. In the same year, he also won an Honour of Distinction from the Dayne Ogilvie Grant, a Canadian award for openly lesbian, gay, bisexual or transgender writers.

In addition to his writing, Miller works as a policy development consultant for Canadian and international non-profit and government agencies, including several charities working around HIV/AIDS.

== Novels ==
- The Featherbed (2002)
- A Sharp Intake of Breath (2007)
- Wild and Beautiful Is the Night (2018)
