= Seymour Mayne =

Canadian author (born 1944)

Seymour Mayne (born 1944 in Montreal, Quebec) is a Canadian author, editor, translator of more than seventy books and monographs, and creative writing professor at the University of Ottawa. As he has written about the Jewish Canadian poets, his work is recognizable by its emphasis on the human dimension, the translation of the experience of the immigrant and the outsider, the finding of joy in the face of adversity, and the linking with tradition and a strong concern with history in its widest sense.

== Early life ==
He was born and raised in Montreal, Quebec, the son of Doris Minkin and Henry Mayne. His father arrived in Canada as a refugee after World War I and his mother entered Canada just days before World War II broke out in Europe.

== Career ==
=== Creative writing ===
His books include Cusp: Word Sonnets (2014), September Rain (2005), and various editions in a number of languages of his collection, Ricochet: Word Sonnets (2004). As an innovator of the word sonnet, he has given readings and lectured widely in Canada and internationally on the "miniature" form.

Over the years, his short stories have appeared in a variety of literary journals and anthologies. The Old Blue Couch: Canadian Stories [El Viejo Sofá Azul: Cuentos Canadienses], a selection of his short fiction in Spanish translation, was published in Argentina in 2004. His literary works continue to receive much critical and scholarly attention internationally.

His writings have been translated into many languages, including French, German, Hebrew, Polish, Portuguese, Russian, and Spanish. In addition, six collections of his poetry have been rendered into Hebrew, including a major volume of his selected poems, Fly Off into the Strongest Light [Leensok letoch haor hachi chazak: Mevchar shirim] (2009).

As a scholar and editor, he has edited many anthologies and critical texts in Canadian literature, including Essential Words: An Anthology of Jewish Canadian Poetry, a comprehensive and pioneer work in the field which includes writing by such key figures as A.M. Klein, Miriam Waddington, and Phyllis Gotlieb. He has also co-edited the award-winning anthologies, Jerusalem: An Anthology of Jewish Canadian Poetry and A Rich Garland: Poems for A.M. Klein. Recent collections and anthologies he co-edited include Foreplay: An Anthology of Word Sonnets and the bilingual Pluriel: Une anthologie, des voix/An Anthology of Diverse Voices.

=== Academic and teaching ===
Alongside his creative writing career, Mayne has been teaching at the University of Ottawa since 1973 where he is Professor of Canadian Literature, Creative Writing, and Canadian Studies, and also serves on the Vered Jewish Canadian Studies Program, whose establishment he oversaw in 2006. He also taught at the University of British Columbia, Concordia University in Montreal, the Hebrew University of Jerusalem, and the University of La Laguna, Canary Islands, Spain.

A longtime resident of Canada's capital, Ottawa, Mayne has helped sustain the city's literary and artistic community over the past three and a half decades. He has given hundreds of lectures and readings at universities and other institutions across Canada, the United States, and abroad. His dedication to learning and writing has also materialized in the promotion of creative writing within the Department of English at the University of Ottawa. He has supervised the publication of a series of more than twenty anthologies drawing on the work of student writers. In his years as an educator, Mayne has acted as a mentor to dozens of aspiring writers.

== Awards ==
Mayne is a five-time winner of the Canadian Jewish Book Award. He also received the J.I. Segal Award in 1974 and the American Literary Translators Association Poetry Translation Award for his renditions from the Yiddish. In 2009, he received the Louis Rosenberg Canadian Jewish Studies Distinguished Service Award, recognising Mayne's significant contribution to the field of Canadian Jewish Studies.

Mayne has also received numerous awards for his academic work, including The Capital Educators' Award (2003), an initiative of the Ottawa Centre for Research and Innovation awarded to educators who have made a difference in the lives of their students by acting as role models, instilling confidence and nurturing leadership; The Excellence in Education Prize (2005), and lastly he was named Professor of the Year in the Faculty of Arts (2010).

== Selected publications ==
=== Poetry ===
- Tiptoeing on the Mount. Montreal: McGill Poetry Series, 1965.
- Manimals. Vancouver: Very Stone House, 1969.
- Mouth. Kingston: The Quarry Press, 1970.
- Name. Erin: Press Porcépic, 1975.
- The Impossible Promised Land: Poems New and Selected. Oakville: Mosaic Press/Valley Editions, 1981.
- Children of Abel. Oakville: Mosaic Press, 1986.
- Killing Time. Oakville: Mosaic Press, 1992.
- The Song of Moses and Other Poems. Illustrations, Sharon Katz. Ottawa: Concertina; London: The Menard Press, 1995. electronic text Ottawa: InterAccess Technology Corp., 1995.
- Dragon trees: poems. Ottawa: Friday Circle, 1997. electronic text 2nd edition, Ottawa: Friday Circle, 2003.
- Carbon Filter: Poems in Dedication. Toronto/Paris/New York: Mosaic Press, 1999.
- Light Industry: Humourous [sic] and Satirical Poems. Oakville/Niagara Falls, NY: Mosaic Press, 2000.
- Ricochet: Word Sonnets. Oakville: Mosaic Press/Niagara Falls, NY, 2004.
- September Rain. Oakville: Mosaic Press/Niagara Falls, NY, 2005.
- A Dream of Birds: Word Sonnets. Co-author with B. Glen Rotchin; illustrations, Sharon Katz. Montréal: Allied Widget, 2007.
- Cusp: Word Sonnets. Illustrations, Sebastian Frye. Toronto: Ronald P. Frye & Co., 2014.
- Dream the Living into Speech: A Selection of Poems and a Homage to Yiddish. Long Beach: Shirim, Double Issue, Vol. XXXIV, No. II & Vol. XXXV, No. 1, 2017.
- Perfume: Poems and Word Sonnets. St. Catharines: Ronald P. Frye & Co., 2020.

=== Short fiction ===
- The Old Blue Couch and Other Stories. Toronto: Ronald P. Frye & Co., 2012.

=== Works in translation ===
==== French ====
- Les pluies de septembre: poèmes choisis 1980-2005 / September Rain: Selected Poems 1980–2005. Translated into French by Pierre DesRuisseaux. Montréal: Éditions du Noroit, 2008.
- Ricochet: Word Sonnets / sonnets d'un mot. Bilingual edition. Translated into French by Sabine Huynh. Ottawa: University of Ottawa Press, 2011.
- Le vieux canapé bleu et autres récits / The Old Blue Couch and Other Stories. Translated into French by Joanne Desroches, Montréal: Mémoire d'encrier, 2015.
- Le chant de Moïse / The Song of Moses. Bilingual edition. Translated into French by Caroline Lavoie. Montreal: Mémoire d'encrier, 2018.

==== Hebrew ====
- Mevasser Ha'chalomot: Meevchar Shirim / Vanguard of Dreams: New and Selected Poems. Translated into Hebrew by Moshe Dor. Bilingual edition. Tel Aviv: Sifriat Poalim, 1984.
- Tekes Pashut: Shirim / Simple Ceremony: Poems. Translated into Hebrew by Moshe Dor and Shlomo Vinner. Tel Aviv: Hakibbutz Hameuchad, 1990.
- Arbeh Ha'dmamah / Locust of Silence. Translated into Hebrew by Moshe Dor. Tel Aviv: Iton 77 Editions, 1993.
- Ir Hanistar: Shirim / City of the Hidden: Poems. Translated into Hebrew by Moshe Dor. Tel Aviv: Gevanim, 1998.
- Linsok le-tokh ha-or hakhi _hazak : miv_har shirim. / Fly off into the strongest light : selected poems. Translated into Hebrew by Moshe Dor. Tel Aviv: Keshev Le’Shira, 2009.
- Hasofa Hakichola Hayeshanah Vesipoorim Acherim / The Old Blue Couch and Other Stories. Translated into Hebrew by Oded Peled. Tel Aviv: Keshev Le’Shira, 2013.
- Ricochet: Sonnetot Milah / Ricochet: Word Sonnets. Translated into Hebrew by Oded Peled. Tel Aviv: Keshev Le’Shira, 2015.

==== Mandarin ====
- Cusp: Word Sonnets / Jiānfēng. Dānzì Shísì Háng Shī. Translated into Mandarin and with an Introduction by Lin Wang. Beijing: Dixie W Publishing, 2022.

==== Portuguese ====
- Plural: uma antologia de diversas vozes do Canadá / Pluriel: une anthologie, des voix / An Anthology of Diverse Voices. Co-editor, translated into Portuguese and edited by Maria da Conceicao Vinciprova Fonseca and Maria Ruth Machado Fellows. Curitiba, Brazil: Editora CRV, 2014.

==== Quadrilingual ====
- Wind and Wood: Word Sonnets / Viento y madera / Vento e madeira / Vent et bois. Edited by María Laura Spoturno, translated into Spanish by María Laura Spoturno et al., into Portuguese by Maria da Conceiçäo Vinciprova Fonseca, and into French by Véronique Lessard and Marc Charron. La Plata, Argentina: Malisia Editorial, 2018.

==== Romanian ====
- Caligrafomanție: Sonete într-un cuvânt / Auspicious Calligraphy: Word Sonnets. Translated into Romanian by Raluca and Chris Tanasescu, with a foreword by Margento and Afterword by Ion Bogdan Lefter. Bucharest: Tracus Arte, 2014.
- Batrana canapea albastra si alte povestiri / The Old Blue Couch and Other Stories. Translated into Romanian by Raluca Tanasescu. Iasi: Adenium, 2014.

==== Russian ====
- Cusp: Word Sonnets / Pik: Slovesnyye sonnety. Translated into Russian by Mikhail Rykov and with an Introduction by Natalia Vesselova. Saint Petersburg: Silver Age, 2019.

==== Spanish ====
- El Viejo Sofá Azul: Cuentos Canadienses / The Old Blue Couch: Canadian Stories. Translated into Spanish by Guillermo Badenes. Córdoba, Argentina: Anábasis/Centro Cultural Canadá, 2004.
- Granizo: Sonetos de una palabra / Hail: Word Sonnets. Bilingual edition, translated into Spanish by María Laura Spoturno et al. La Plata, Argentina: Universidad Nacional de La Plata, 2006.
- Reflejos: Sonetos de una palabra / Ricochet: Word Sonnets. Bilingual edition, translated into Spanish by María Laura Spoturno et al., edited by María Laura Spoturno. La Plata, Argentina: Ediciones Al Margen, 2008.

==== Turkish ====
- Cusp: Word Sonnets / Eşik: Sözcük Soneleri. Edited by Mert Moralı. Translated into Turkish by Mert Moralı, Gizem Çolakoğlu, Berken Hezer et al. and with an Introduction by Şehnaz Tahir Gürçağlar. İstanbul: 160. Kilometre, 2023.

==== Trilingual ====
- On the Cusp: Word Sonnets / Albores: Sonetos de una palabra / À l’orée: Sonnets d’un mot. Edited by María Laura Spoturno, translated into Spanish by María Laura Spoturno et al. and into French by Sabine Huynh. La Plata, Argentina: FaHCE, Universidad Nacional de La Plata, 2013.

=== Works edited ===
- Poetry of Canada. Co-editor. Buffalo, N.Y.: Intrepid Press, 1969.
- Forty Women Poets of Canada. Co-editor. Montreal: Ingluvin Publications, 1971.
- The A.M. Klein Symposium. Ottawa: University of Ottawa Press, 1975.
- Irving Layton: The Poet and His Critics. Toronto: McGraw-Hill Ryerson, 1978.
- Generations: Selected Poems by Rachel Korn. Oakville: Mosaic Press, 1982.
- Essential Words: An Anthology of Jewish Canadian Poetry. Ottawa: Oberon Press, 1985.
- At the Edge: Canadian Literature and Culture at Century's End. Co-editor. Jerusalem: Magnes Press/Halbert Centre for Canadian Studies, 1995.
- Jerusalem: An Anthology of Jewish Canadian Poetry. Co-editor. Montreal: Véhicule Press, 1996.
- Selected Poems of A.M. Klein. Co-editor. Toronto/Buffalo/London: University of Toronto Press, 1997.
- A Rich Garland: Poems for A. M. Klein. Co-editor. Montreal: Véhicule Press, 1999.
- Visible Living: Poems Selected and New, by Marya Fiamengo. Co-editor. Vancouver: Ronsdale Press, 2006.
- Pluriel: une anthologie, des voix / An Anthology of Diverse Voices. Co-editor. Ottawa: University of Ottawa Press, 2008.
- Voces del norte: Cuentos canadienses hasta la Primera Guerra Mundial / Voices from the North: Canadian Stories to World War I. Translated into Spanish by Guillermo Badenes and Josefina Coisson, with an interview Afterword by the editor. Córdoba, Argentina: Editorial Icaro/Centro Cultural Canadá Córdoba, 2009.
- Jewish Canadian Poetry. Long Beach: Shirim, Double Issue, Vol. XXIX, No. II & Vol. XXX, No. I, 2012.
- Irving Layton: The Jewish Poems. Long Beach: Shirim, Double Issue, Vol XXXVII, No. II & Vol. XXXVIII, 1, 2020.
- "A Sheaf of Ottawa Poems.” Kathmandu: Pratik, A Magazine of Contemporary Literature, Vol. XVI, No. 2, 2020.
- Transplanting Roots: The Adam Fuerstenberg Reader. St. Catharines: Ronald P. Frye & Co., 2025.

=== Works translated ===
- Genealogy of Instruments by Jerzy Harasymowicz. Co-translated from the Polish. Ottawa: Valley Editions, 1974.
- Burnt Pearls: Ghetto Poems of Abraham Sutzkever. Translated from the Yiddish. With an Introduction by Ruth R. Wisse. Oakville: Mosaic Press/Valley Editions, 1981.
- Night Prayer and Other Poems by Melech Ravitch. Selected and co-translated from the Yiddish. Oakville: Mosaic Press, 1993.
- I Live on a Raft by Jerzy Harasymowicz. Co-translated from the Polish. Ottawa: Concertina/InterAccess Technology Corp., 1994.
- In Your Words: Translations from the Yiddish and the Hebrew. Toronto: Ronald P. Frye & Co., 2017.

=== Selected publications available online ===
- The Song of Moses and Other Poems. Illustrations, Sharon Katz. Ottawa: Concertina; London: The Menard Press, 1995. electronic text Ottawa: InterAccess Technology Corp., 1995.
- Dragon trees: poems. Ottawa: Friday Circle, 1997. electronic text 2nd edition, Ottawa: Friday Circle, 2003.
- Foreplay: An Anthology of Word Sonnets. Co-editor. Ottawa: Friday Circle, 2004.
- Ricochet: Word Sonnets / sonnets d'un mot. Bilingual edition. Translated into French by Sabine Huynh. Ottawa: University of Ottawa Press, 2011.
- On the Cusp: Word Sonnets / Albores: Sonetos de una palabra / À l’orée: Sonnets d’un mot. Trilingual edition, edited by María Laura Spoturno, translated into Spanish by María Laura Spoturno et al. and into French by Sabine Huynh. La Plata, Argentina: FaHCE, Universidad Nacional de La Plata, 2013.
- Pilot Light: Word Sonnets. Toronto: White Wall Review, 2018.
- Wind and Wood: Word Sonnets / Viento y madera / Vento e madeira / Vent et bois. Edited by María Laura Spoturno, translated into Spanish by María Laura Spoturno et al., into Portuguese by Maria da Conceiçäo Vinciprova Fonseca, and into French by Véronique Lessard and Marc Charron. La Plata, Argentina: Malisia Editorial, 2018.
- Bridges: An Ottawa Anthology. Ottawa: Friday Circle, 2019.
- Seymour MAYNE, "Wind and Wood. Word Sonnets / Viento y madera. Sonetos de una palabra / Vent et bois. Sonnets d’un mot / Vento e madeira. Sonetos de uma palabra. Selección." Soria, Spain: Hermenēus, Universidad de Valladolid, Dec. 20, 2019
- Mayne, Seymour, and María Laura Spoturno. 2021. “The Word Sonnet: A Distillation: A Conversation Between Author Seymour Mayne and Editor and Translator María Laura Spoturno”. Tusaaji: A Translation Review 8 (1).
