= Kenneth Sherman =

Canadian poet and essayist

Kenneth Sherman (born 1950) is a Canadian poet and essayist. He has written ten books of poetry. His 2017 memoir, Wait Time, was nominated for the RBC Taylor Prize for non-fiction.

== Biography ==
Sherman was born in Toronto, Ontario, in 1950. He has a BA from York University, where he studied with Eli Mandel and Irving Layton, and an MA in English Literature from the University of Toronto.

While a student at York University, Sherman co-founded and edited the literary journal WAVES. From 1974-1975 he traveled extensively through Asia. He began his teaching career in 1975 at York University's Atkinson College. For several years he was a full-time faculty member at Sheridan College. He also taught creative writing courses at York University and in the Continuing Education Department at the University of Toronto.

In 1982, Sherman was writer-in-residence at Trent University. In 1986 he was invited by the Chinese government to lecture on contemporary Canadian literature at universities and government institutions in Beijing. In 1988, he received a Canada Council grant to travel through Poland and Russia. This experience inspired several of the essays in his book Void and Voice (1998). His book, What the Furies Bring (2009) continues his interest in “the Europe of Primo Levi and Czeslaw Milosz.”

Sherman has published ten books of poetry, including the acclaimed long poems, "Words for Elephant Man" and "Black River".

In 2010, after Sherman was diagnosed with kidney cancer, he began keeping a notebook which he turned into the memoir, Wait Time. In 2017, his memoir Wait Time was nominated for the RBC Taylor Prize for non-fiction.

Sherman is a three-time winner of the Canadian Jewish Book Awards.

== Bibliography ==
=== Poetry ===
- Snake Music. Oakville, ON: Mosaic Press, 1978. ISBN 0-88962-081-4
- The Cost of Living. Oakville, ON: Mosaic Press, 1981. ISBN 0-88962-149-7
- Words for Elephant Man. Oakville, ON. Mosaic Press, 1983 ISBN 0-88962-199-3
- Black Flamingo. Oakville, ON. Mosaic Press, 1985. ISBN 0-88962-283-3
- The Book of Salt. Ottawa, ON: Oberon Press, 1987. ISBN 0-88750-698-4
- Jackson's Point. Ottawa, ON: Oberon Press, 1989. ISBN 0-88750-7697-7
- Open to Currents. Toronto: Wolsak & Wynn, 1992. ISBN 0-919897-29-0
- Clusters: Poems. Oakville, ON. Mosaic Press, 1997. ISBN 0-88962-638-3
- The Well: New and selected poems. Toronto: Wolsak and Wynn, 2000. ISBN 0-919897-73-8
- Black River. Erin, ON: The Porcupine's Quill, 2007. ISBN 978-0889842892
- Words for Elephant Man (revised). Erin, ON: The Porcupine's Quill, 2012. ISBN 978-0-88984-350-9
- Jogging with the Great Ray Charles. Toronto: ECW Press 2016.ISBN 978-1-77041-344-3

=== Non-fiction ===
- Void and Voice: Essays on literary and historical currents. Oakville, ON, & Buffalo, NY: Mosaic Press, 1998. ISBN 0-88962-645-6
- What the Furies Bring. Erin, ON: Porcupine's Quill, 2009. ISBN 978-0-88984-318-9
- Wait Time: A memoir of cancer. Waterloo, ON: Wilfrid Laurier University Press, 2016. ISBN 978-1-77112-190-3

=== Edited ===
- Relations: An anthology of family poems. Oakville, ON, & New York: Mosaic Press, 1986. ISBN 0-88962-338-4
