= Nancy Richler =

Canadian novelist

- Born: May 16, 1957; Montreal, Quebec, Canada
- Died: January 18, 2018 (aged 60); Vancouver, British Columbia, Canada
- Education: Brandeis University; University of Denver
- Occupation: Novelist
- Writing career
- Years active: 1988–2018

Nancy Richler (May 16, 1957 – January 18, 2018) was a Canadian novelist. Her novels won two international awards and were shortlisted for three others; Richler was also shortlisted for the Canadian Booksellers Association Author of the Year award in 2013.

== Early life ==
Richler was born in Montreal, Quebec in 1957 to Dianne and Myer Richler, and grew up there with two siblings. Her paternal grandfather, Jacob, died a few hours before she was born. She moved to the United States in 1975, when she was 18 years old, and attended Brandeis University near Boston, Massachusetts, graduating with a degree in history. She then studied social work and worked with young people, and in 1986 she completed a Master of Arts degree in international studies, specialising in the Soviet Union, at the University of Denver Graduate School. She was Jewish.

== Writing career ==
In 1988 Richler moved to Vancouver, British Columbia, and began writing fiction.

Richler's first novel was Throwaway Angels, published by Press Gang Publishers in 1996. The book is based on the real-life unsolved crimes of women sex workers who disappeared in Vancouver's downtown east side. The novel was shortlisted for an Arthur Ellis Award for Best First Crime Novel. Her 2003 novel, Your Mouth Is Lovely (published by HarperCollins and Ecco Press), is a historical novel set in Russia between 1890 and 1912. It has been translated into seven languages, and won the 2003 Canadian Jewish Book Award for Fiction and the 2004 Adei Wizo Award in Italy.

Richler's 2012 novel The Imposter Bride (published by HarperCollins) is set in post-World War II Montreal and tells the story of a Russian woman who travels to Canada for an arranged marriage, only to be rejected by her would-be husband and instead married to his brother. The book was a shortlisted nominee for the 2012 Scotiabank Giller Prize and was also shortlisted for the Canadian Booksellers Association's 2013 Libris Award, in the Fiction category. In the same year, Richler was shortlisted for the Libris Award in the Author of the Year category.

Richler also wrote short stories, which were published in magazines and anthologies including New Quarterly, Prairie Fire, A Room of One's Own and the Journey Prize Anthology.

== Personal life ==
Richler was a second cousin of novelist Mordecai Richler. Her partner, Vicki Trerise, is a lawyer and mediator.

In the early 2010s Richler returned to Montreal to take care of her elderly parents. In 2013–2014 she was writer-in-residence at the University of Ottawa.

Richler died of cancer in Vancouver on January 18, 2018, at the age of 60.
