= Goldie Morgentaler =

Canadian literary translator and literature professor

Goldie Morgentaler (born 1950) is a Canadian Yiddish-to-English literary translator as well as a professor of English literature. She currently holds a professorship at the University of Lethbridge, where she teaches nineteenth-century British and American literature as well as modern Jewish literature.

== Career ==
Her translation repertoire includes several stories by I. L. Peretz. She is also the primary translator of much of her mother's work, including The Tree of Life: A Trilogy of Life in the Lodz Ghetto and Survivors: Seven Short Stories, for which she won the 2005 Helen and Stan Vine Canadian Jewish Book Award and the Modern Language Association's Fenia and Yaakov Leviant Memorial Prize for Yiddish Studies in 2006. She is the author of Dickens and Heredity: When Like Begets Like (1999), as well as of articles on Dickens, Victorian literature, translation and the works of Chava Rosenfarb. In 1992, she translated Michel Tremblay's classic French-Canadian play Les Belles-Sœurs (1965) from French into Yiddish for performance by the Yiddish Theatre of Montreal under the directorship of Dora Wasserman. The Yiddish title of the play was Di Shvegerins. Her translation of Chava Rosenfarb's play The Bird of the Ghetto, about the Vilna Ghetto resistance leader, Isaac Wittenberg, was performed in a staged reading by Threshold Theatre of Toronto in November 2012. She is also the editor of Chava Rosenfarb's book of poetry in English, entitled Exile at Last (2013).

== Personal life ==
Morgentaler is the daughter of Holocaust survivor and Yiddish-language author Chava Rosenfarb and abortion rights activist physician Henry Morgentaler. Her husband is Jonathan Seldin.

== Awards ==
- 2005 Helen and Stan Vine Canadian Jewish Book Award
- 2006 Modern Language Association's Fenia and Yaakov Leviant Memorial Prize for Yiddish Studies
