= Vivian Jeanette Kaplan =

Canadian writer and business owner (born 1946)

Vivian Jeanette Kaplan (born June 17, 1946) is a Canadian writer and business owner.

The daughter of Gerda Kosiner, she was born in Shanghai. Her parents were Jews from Vienna; her mother tongue was German. Kaplan came to Canada with her parents at the age of two; the family settled in Toronto. She studied English, French and Spanish at the University of Toronto. Kaplan operated Vivian Kaplan Oriental Interiors, a company which imported home furnishings from East Asia, for twenty years.

She wrote her family's story in Ten Green Bottles: The True Story of One Family's Journey from War-Torn Austria to the Ghettos of Shanghai. The book received the Canadian Jewish Book Award in 2003 and the Adei-Wizo Prize presented in Florence, Italy in 2007. A play based on the book was brought to the stage in Toronto in 2009.

In 2013, Kaplan published a historical novel Blind Vision. Within this book Kaplan, after extensive and meticulous research, describes in fine detail how she concluded, beyond a reasonable doubt, that Christopher Columbus was a secret Sephardic Jew. In a 2014 interview, available on YouTube, she provides an overview of what led her to this surprising conclusion. Ten years later, in 2024, it was shown to be correct as a result of DNA analyses of his bones.
