= Naomi Kramer =

Canadian curator

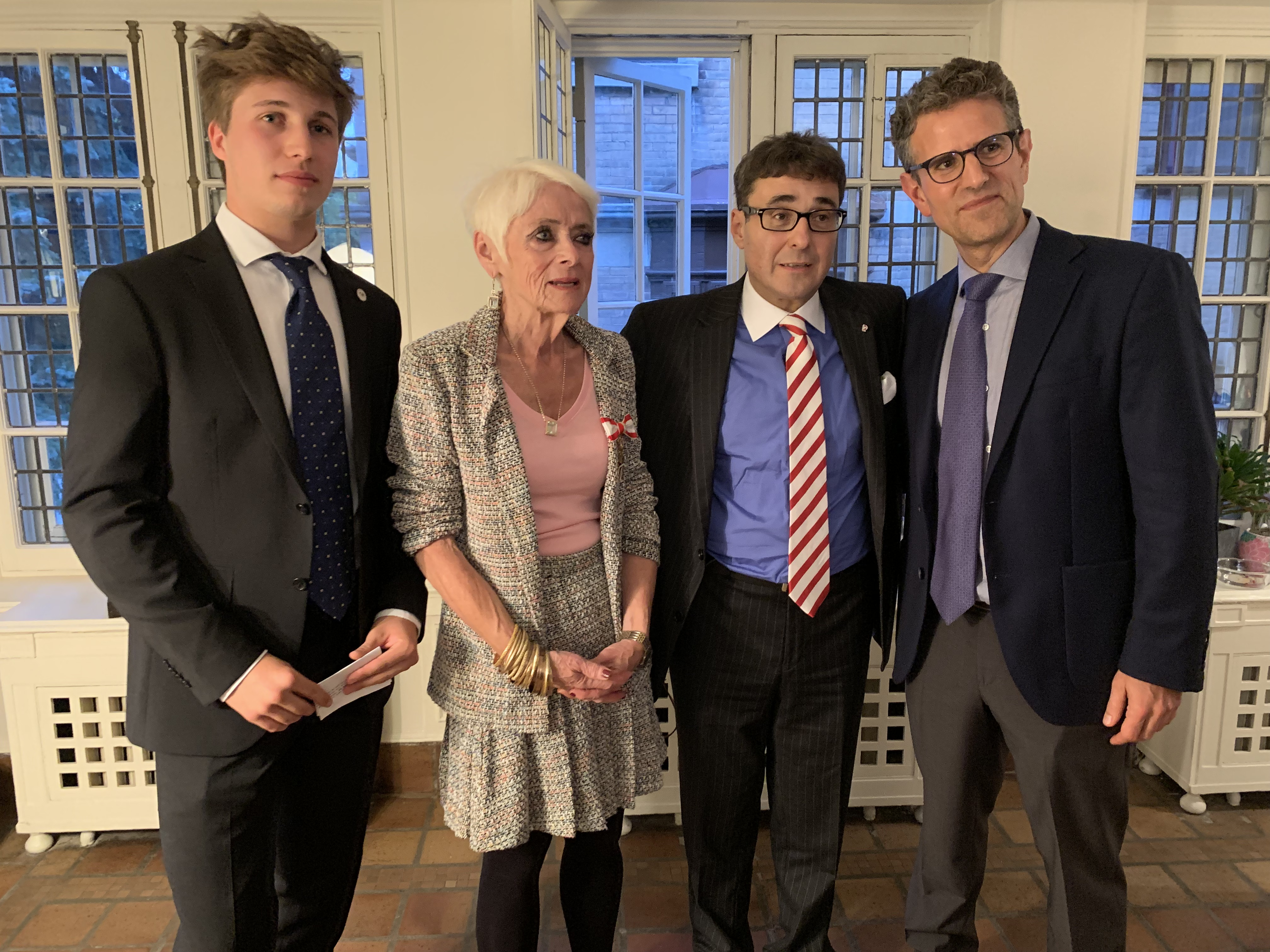
Reception of the gold medal for Services to the Republic of Austria to Naomi Kramer

Naomi Kramer (born 8 January 1952 in Ontario, Canada) is a Canadian curator and president of the Holocaust Education and Genocide Prevention Foundation.

== Early life and career ==
From 1978 until 1985 Kramer worked as a director at the Galix Corporation in New York, where she supervised 300 employees. In 1985 she was employed as a display artist at Dawson Displays in Montreal, where she was responsible for several exhibitions at Holt Renfrew, Northern Telecom, La Baie, and Philips International; Exhibits in the Museum of Science and Technology, Ottawa, Ontario; Catalogue of Cree Art, Canadian Museum of Civilization.

== Holocaust Education Career ==
=== Montreal Holocaust Museum ===
Naomi began her tenure in 1992 as the education director at the former Montreal Holocaust Memorial Center (Montreal Holocaust Museum). In her nine years as an education director, Kramer developed Docent Training Programmes, lectured at the McGill University, and created numerous multimedia educational programmes. Additionally, she was responsible for teacher's guides for Holocaust education in elementary, high school as well as at college levels.

=== Canadian Jewish Virtual Museum ===
In 2001 Kramer became the project director of the Canadian Jewish Virtual Museum. She oversaw the development of the first Canadian Jewish Museum Website, the creation of communal archival database, the budget implementation and writing reports to Federal Government. Furthermore, she produced numerous multimedia and educational videos. The Flash introduction was used as a model by Canadian Heritage for cultural institutions setting up virtual Websites.

=== Jewish Museum ===
In 2002 Kramer started working as a museum consultant on the development of the Museum of Jewish Montreal. She was responsible for the liaison with Municipal, Provincial, and Federal Government Agencies. Additionally, she developed Collections Policy, recruited board members and co-drafted the By-Laws.

=== Holocaust Education and Genocide Prevention Foundation ===
Kramer is the president and founder (1995) of the Holocaust Education and Genocide Prevention Foundation (HGEP), a non-profit organization mandated to educate the public about the destructive powers of prejudice and discrimination.

She was a delegate to academic conferences in Israel, the United States, Germany and Austria. Furthermore, she is the co-coordinator for the Annual Symposium on the Holocaust and Genocide at Vanier College.

=== Austrian Holocaust Memorial Service ===
In 1994, Kramer was designated as one of the first international partners of the Verein Austrian Service Abroad, Gedenkdienst the Republic of Austria's program to place young Austrians as volunteers at Holocaust and peace related institutions in lieu of compulsory military service.

=== Vanier College ===
An early pioneer of bilingual tolerance-based programming across Canada, Kramer spearheaded the launch of an annual symposium at Vanier College on the Holocaust and Genocide now entering its 28th year. In May 2018 to mark the anniversary of her almost three-decade involvement with the program, she led a HEGP educational trip to Austria and Italy entitled, "Moral Responsibility: Global Citizenship" for 25 students from Vanier College and Concordia University. In Italy, Kramer organized a round table discussion with Father Norbert Hoffmann, Secretary of the Pontifical Commission for Religious Relations with the Jews in Vatican City. In Vienna, the students were hosted by City Councillor, Tanja Whesley at the Rathaus and by Canadian Ambassador, Mark Bailey at his residence. In Linz the group visited Mauthausen and met with Niklas Frank, son of infamous war criminal Hans Frank and Gauleiter of Poland during the Second World War.

== Publications ==
=== Literature ===
- Kramer, Naomi. Kristallnacht: Icon of the Shoah, in Building History: The Shoah in Art, Memory, and Myth ed. Peter Daly, Karl Filser, Alain Goldschlager, and Naomi Kramer, Peter Lang Publishing. New York, 2001.
- Kramer, Naomi. The Institutionalization of Memory: Museums as Keepers of the Past and Educators for the Future, in Building History: The Shoah in Art, Memory, and Myth ed. Peter Daly, Karl Filser, Alain Goldschlager, and Naomi Kramer, Peter Lang Publishing. New York, 2001.
- Kramer, Naomi. The Transformation of the Shoah in Film, in Building History: The Shoah in Art, Memory, and Myth ed. Peter Daly, Karl Filser, Alain Goldschlager, and Naomi Kramer, Peter Lang Publishing. New York, 2001.
- Kramer, Naomi. Museums and Holocaust Education in Canadian Children's Literature/Litérature canadienne pour la jeunesse Issue no.96 Spring 2001, University of Guelph.
- Kramer, Naomi and Headland, Ronald. The Fallacy of Race and the Shoah, University of Ottawa Press, Ottawa, 1998.
- Kramer, Naomi. Visualizing Memory. . . a last detail, in Ronald Headland ed. So Others Will Remember: Holocaust History and Survivor Testimony Véhicule Press, Montreal, 1997.

=== CD-ROM and Video ===
- The Holocaust in German History. Goethe Institute, Munich, 1999. CD-ROM (Member, International Advisory Task Force)
- Fact, Fiction, and Propaganda (2001) DVD and pedagogical guide designed to alert students to the destructive powers of prejudice. It exams the history of propaganda and provides tools of analysis for establishing credible websites
- Visualizing Memory. . . a last detail. (1997) Distributor: Ergo Productions, USA, Educational video
- Historical Overview of Congregation Shaar Hashomayim. (2001) History video

A Tribute to Millie Lande C.M. (2001) Fundraising Video, Congregation Shaar Hashomayim

- Canadian Jewish Virtual Museum and Archives (2002) Films: Nachum Wilchesky: "Yidishkeit On The Air." Be Prepared: Jewish Brownies and Girl Guides
- Oral Histories: Edward Bronfman, Rosetta Elkin, Bernard Finestone, Gloria Victor Halpern, Mildred Lande C.M.

=== Exhibits ===
==== Visualizing Memory ====
Visualizing memory presents the exhibits of Leo Haas, the works of an artist interned in the Terezín concentration camp (Theresienstadt 1939–1945) and Theresienstadt, impressions of Terezín (1993) by contemporary artists from the Anton Lehmden Master Class at the Academy of Visual Arts, Vienna. The exhibit poignantly illustrates how our surroundings and past influence art and how art can be used to encourage critical thinking, prompting us to seek our own answers. It was launched in Canada's Parliament and has been shown in Ottawa, Montreal, and at the Austrian Embassy in Washington, DC. Most significantly, the cooperation of the Embassy of Austria and the Embassy of Israel has resulted in the description of the exhibit as, "an innovative, cultural initiative promoting global communication."

==== Children in the Holocaust ====
Children in the Holocaust: A Legacy is a didactic narrative, which focuses on the tragic experiences of children during the Shoah. It is composed of some one hundred and fifty photographs, sixty artifacts and documents and text panels. The theme encourages the viewer to have the moral courage to care and respond when confronted either by our own prejudice or that of others. The exhibit has been shown extensively across North America including the State Capitol in Austin Texas, the University of Colorado, and in Montreal, Canada at the Maison de la Culture, International Child Survivor Conference, International Physician's Conference on Bereavement, Concordia and McGill Universities.

==== La caravane de la tolerance ====
La caravane de la tolerance includes a pedagogical programme which, challenges students to confront the fact that we are all keepers of prejudice through the examination of contemporary genocides. The exhibit promotes respect, understanding, and harmony among Quebec's diverse multicultural groups. Kramer was a museum consultant with the Comité du Rapprochement Québec.

==== Dreyfus ====
Dreyfus: A Current Affair examines the relationship between the state and the individual. It prompts the viewer to examine where moral responsibility lies. What part does nationalism play in promoting discrimination and social injustice? Kramer was an educational consultant to the Beitler Foundation for this exhibit, which was launched in the National Assembly of France and toured South Africa.

==== Educating for the Future: United Talmud Torah 1896-1996 ====
Educating for the Future: United Talmud Torah 1896-1996 is a historical narrative of the UTT school system in Montreal. The secondary goal is the examination of the interplay and dynamics between political, cultural, and religious institutions from the perspective of state and local history.

==== German Jewish Children's Literature ====
German Jewish children's literature is an exhibit that originates in Oldenburg, Germany. Kramer designed and wrote the pedagogical guide, in addition to organizing several educational programmes, which accompanied the exhibit in Montreal. It created unprecedented opportunities for dialogue between third generation Germans and Jews and was presented in cooperation with the Goethe Institute and the Saidye Bronfman Centre for the Arts.

==== Congregation Shaar Hashomayim Museum ====
Congregation Shaar Hashomayim Museum was launched September 15, 2001. She was curator of this cogent historical analysis of Ashkenazi Jews in Canada from 1850 to present.

==== Canadian Jewish Virtual Museum and Archives ====
Canadian Jewish Virtual Museum and Archives was supported by a grant from Canadian Heritage. The exhibit brings educational opportunities in the areas of tolerance, human rights, civil liberties, and Canada's role as an internationally recognized leader and promoter of minority group rights from within the history of Canadian Jews. A unique feature of this exhibit is the custom designed database, which enabled all Canadian Jewish organizations to preserve and record their history.

== Awards ==
=== Gold Medal of Honour for Services to the Republic of Austria ===
On 18 September 2019 Naomi Kramer received a Decoration of Honour for Services to the Republic of Austria from the Austrian Ambassador to Canada, Dr. Stefan Pehringer.

=== Women Who Work ===
In 2018 Kramer was awarded for the: "Women Who Work" award by the Gabon Ambassador, Sosthèbe Ngokila.

== See also ==
- Montreal Holocaust Museum
- Austrian Holocaust Memorial Service
- Austrian Service Abroad
- House of Responsibility
