= Road to Valour =

Non-fiction book about Gino Bartali

- First edition (UK)
- Author: Aili and Andres McConnon
- Language: English
- Subject: Cycling, World War II, Italy
- Genre: Non-fiction
- Published: 12 June 2012
- Publisher: Weidenfeld & Nicolson (UK); Doubleday Canada; Crown Publishing Group (US))
- Pages: 336
- ISBN: 978-0307590657

Road to Valour: A True Story of World War II Italy, the Nazis, and the Cyclist Who Inspired a Nation is a non-fiction book about the humanitarian and two-time Tour de France-winning cyclist, Gino Bartali, which was written by Aili and Andres McConnon and first published in 2012.

The book chronicles Bartali's journey from poverty as a child in Tuscany to a career as a professional cyclist that saw him win the Tour de France in 1938 and 1948. It also highlights his efforts to assist groups politically targeted in World War II-era Italy, including smuggling false identity documents and sheltering a Jewish family.

== Reception ==
On September 8, 2012, the book was number eight after a five-week period on the Maclean's Non-Fiction Bestseller List.

=== Critical reception ===
Ben Reiter of Sports Illustrated praised the book's “exhaustive research,” and compared it to Laura Hillenbrand's “Seabiscuit: An American Legend.” Bill Littlefield reviewed the book for NPR and in The Boston Globe, praised the authors for telling the story of Bartali's "great and greater victories powerfully and well.” The Globe and Mail called it “(i)mpeccably researched and thrillingly told." Publishers Weekly found it to be “both inspiring and immensely enjoyable.” Booklist described it as a "dramatic and moving story that is virtually unknown to most readers." Nobel Laureate Elie Wiesel described Bartali's story as "a moving example of moral courage."

=== Honors ===
Road to Valour won the Mazzei Prize from the National Italian-American Foundation in 2012, a Christopher Award, and the Canadian Jewish Book Award for biography in 2013. It was also shortlisted as a finalist for the 2013 PEN/ESPN Prize for Literary Sports Writing.
