= Jeffrey Veidlinger =

American historian

Jeffrey Veidlinger is Joseph Brodsky Collegiate Professor of History and Judaic Studies, University of Michigan, United States. His interests include history of East European and Russian Jewry. He was director of the Frankel Center for Judaic Studies of the university (2015–2021), and is the founding director of the Raoul Wallenberg Institute at the University of Michigan.

B.A. Honors in history from the McGill University (1993), Ph.D. in history from the Georgetown University (1998).

Professor Veidlinger's other positions include Vice-President of American Academy for Jewish Research, former chair of the Academic Advisory Council of the Center for Jewish History, a former Vice-President of the Association for Jewish Studies, and a member of the Academic Committee of the United States Holocaust Memorial Museum.

He was subject to sanctions by Russia in the context of the Russo-Ukrainian war.

== Books ==
- 2000, 2006: The Moscow State Yiddish Theater: Jewish Culture on the Soviet Stage
- 2009: Jewish Public Culture in the Late Russian Empire
- 2013: Shadow of the Shtetl: Small-Town Jewish Life in Soviet Ukraine
- 2016:Going to the People: Jews and the Ethnographic Impulse
- 2021: In the Midst of Civilized Europe: The Pogroms of 1918–1921 and the Onset of the Holocaust

== Awards ==
- 2001: Barnard Hewitt Award for Theatre Scholarship for The Moscow State Yiddish Theater
- 2010: Abe and Fay Bergel Award in Scholarship at the Canadian Jewish Book Awards and J. I . Segal Award for Jewish Public Culture in the Late Russian Empire
- 2014: Canadian Jewish Book Award for In the Shadow of the Shtetl
- 2022: Lionel Gelber Prize, shortlisted for In the Midst of Civilized Europe
