= Alan T. Davies =

Canadian Christian minister and academic

The Reverend Alan T. Davies
- Born: Alan Trewartha Davies; 1933 (age 92–93); Canada

Ecclesiastical career
- Religion: Christianity
- Church: United Church of Canada

Academic background
- Education: McGill University; Union Theological Seminary
- Thesis: A Critique of Representative Theological Doctrines Concerning the Jews in the Context of the Church's Involvement in Antisemitism (1966)

Academic work
- Discipline: Religious studies
- Institutions: Victoria University, Toronto
- Main interests: Antisemitism; Christian–Jewish relations

Alan Trewartha Davies (born 1933) is a Canadian Christian minister and academic who is emeritus professor of religion at the University of Toronto, Canada. He is also an ordained minister in the United Church of Canada.

== Career ==
From 1969 to 1989, Davies was lecturer and then associate professor in the religious studies department at Victoria College. From 1989 to 1998, he was professor at the Centre for the Study of Religion of the University of Toronto. Davies conducted research into the relations between Jews and Christians.

== Publications ==
His books Anti-Semitism in Canada and How Silent Were the Churches? (with Marilyn F. Nefsky) received Canadian Jewish Book Awards.

His ideas in his readings focus around the attitudes of protestants towards judaism, and the effects they have on modern and historic cultural events.
