= I Was a Child of Holocaust Survivors =

- Directed by: Ann Marie Fleming
- Written by: Ann Marie Fleming
- Produced by: Gerry Flahive; Michael Fukushima
- Edited by: Ann Marie Fleming; Ileana Pietrobruno
- Music by: Pierre Yves Drapeau; Normand Roger
- Release date: 2010
- Running time: 15 minutes
- Country: Canada
- Language: English

I Was a Child of Holocaust Survivors is a 2010 animated film by Ann Marie Fleming based on a 2006 autobiographical graphic novel by Bernice Eisenstein. In the book and its film adaptation, Eisenstein explores her own identity through the experience of her parents, both Auschwitz survivors.

== Production ==
Fleming was one of several animators approached by National Film Board of Canada producer Michael Fukushima for film treatments for a planned adaption of Eisenstein's book. Fleming had never head of the book and was at first reluctant, as she was more accustomed to creating her own personal works and because as a non-Jew, she was unsure she would be able to portray Eisenstein's story. She was assured that her background was not an issue for the NFB or the author, and submitted a proposal that was eventually accepted. Work on the 15-minute film would take almost four years, with Fleming using three animators: Lillian Chan, Howie Shia and Kevin Langdale. The film was named one of the Toronto International Film Festival's top ten Canadian films of the year.
