= Bouena Sarfatty =

Jewish Greek World War II partisan, writer of verse and needleworker

- Sarfatty on her wedding day, with husband Max Gatfinkle
- Born: November 15, 1916; Salonica, Macedonia, Greece
- Died: July 23, 1997 (aged 80); Canada

Bouena Sarfatty, married name Bouena Sarfatty Garfinkle (15 November 1916 – 23 July 1997) was a Jewish Greek World War II partisan, a writer of verse, and a renowned needleworker.

== Life ==
She was born in Thessaloniki (then Salonica) in northern Greece. As a young woman, Sarfatty was well educated. She studied couture in Marseille, and was fluent in French, Greek and Ladino. She was part of the high society of Salonica, being presented as a debutante. After the Nazis invaded Salonica in 1941, she volunteered with the Red Cross, and also carried messages between young men in the labour camps and their families. She fell out with Vital Hasson, the leader of the Jewish collaborators. She was engaged to be married but her fiancé was shot on what was to be their wedding day after Hasson informed the Nazis that he had escaped from his labour group. Sarfatty was imprisoned by the Nazis in their Pablo Mela prison, but escaped with the help of a partisan disguised as a German officer: this partisan was later captured, tortured and killed. Sarfatty joined the partisans, adopting the name of Maria (Maritsa) Serafamidou, supposedly from Komotini in Thrace. She worked with them during the rest of the war, and a film was later made, in Greece, about her achievements. In 1945 she returned to Salonica to work as a dietician for the refugee camps but also, under cover, to arrange transport to Palestine for Jewish survivors.

In 1946, she married Max Garfinkle, with whom she had worked in Salonica. After a short stay at his kibbutz in Israel, they moved to Montreal, Canada, in 1947. She died there on 23 July 1997, leaving a son and four grandchildren.

== Legacy ==
In 2013, Renee Levine Melammed published An Ode to Salonica: the Ladino verses of Bouena Sarfatty (Indiana University Press: ISBN 9780253007094), with translations of Sarfatty's 500 coplas or short verses reflecting Sephardic life in Salonica.

Her collection of Sephardic music formed part of the topic of a PhD dissertation "The Ladino Song in the 20th Century: A Study of the Collections of Emily Sene and Bouena Sarfatty-Garfinkle" by Rivka Havassy at Bar-Ilan University in 2007. Ethnomusicologist Judith R. Cohen used Sarfatty as a primary source for her research on Judeo-Spanish (Ladino) songs of the Sephardic refugee community in Montreal.
