= Susan Glickman =

American-born Canadian writer and critic (born 1953)

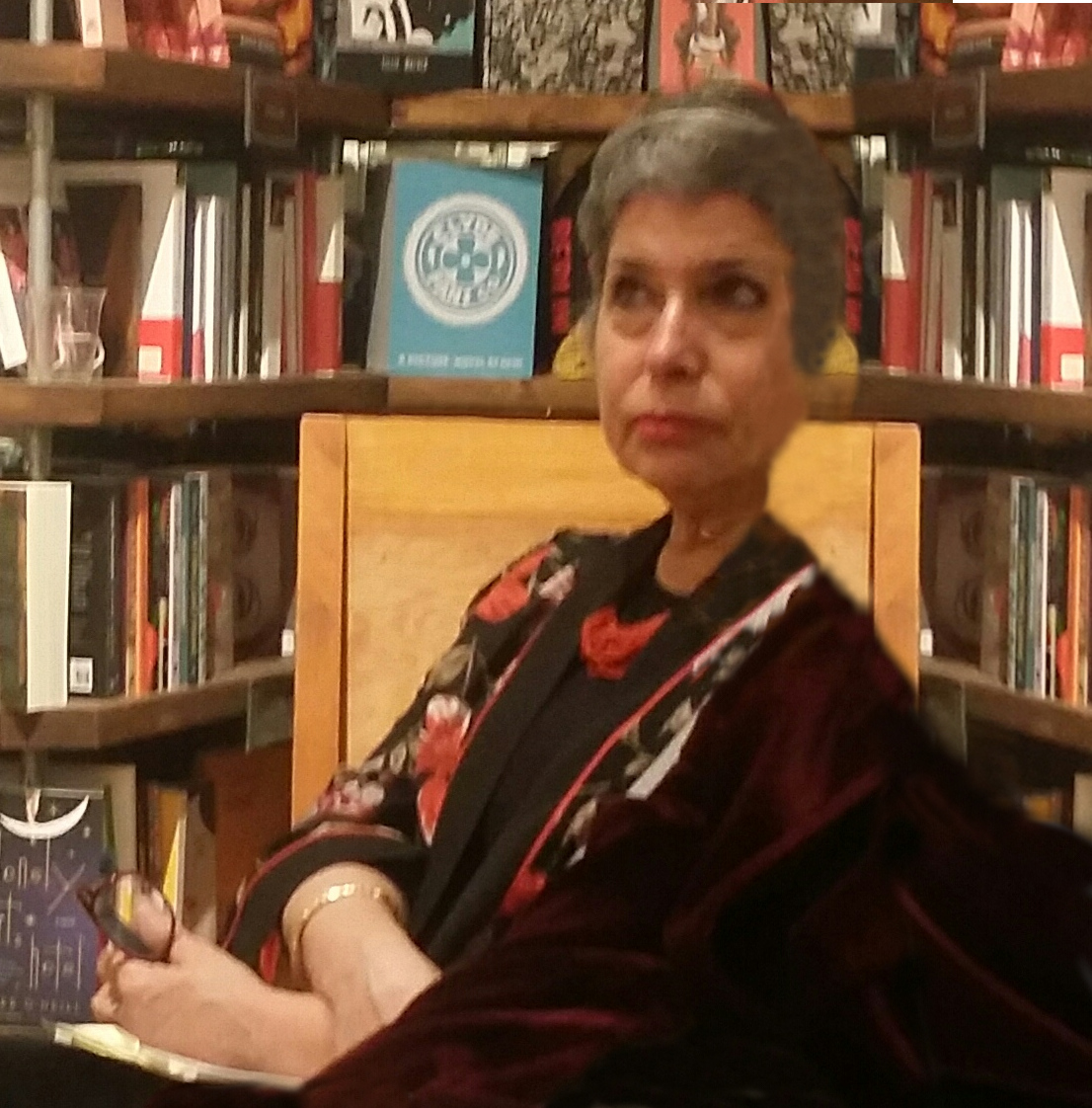
Susan Glickman at the Drawn & Quarterly South Bookstore in Montréal, Québec, Canada, 2018

Susan Glickman (born 1953 at Baltimore) is a Canadian writer, editor, and critic. She has taught English at the University of Toronto and creative writing at the University of Toronto and Toronto Metropolitan University.

== Career ==
Glickman was an English professor at the University of Toronto, where she wrote her doctoral dissertation on Shakespeare's dramaturgy. She also works as an freelance editor, primarily of academic texts.

Glickman's first novel, The Violin Lover, won the Canadian Jewish Book Award for Fiction and was listed as one of the best books of 2006 by The National Post and The Picturesque & the Sublime: A Poetics of the Canadian Landscape (1998) won both the Gabrielle Roy prize for the year's best work of literary criticism and the Raymond Klibansky prize for the year's best work in the humanities. Her essays and reviews have appeared in magazines including Maisonneuve, Brick, Essays on Canadian Writing, The Journal of Canadian Poetry and The University of Toronto Quarterly among others, and her poetry has been translated into French and Greek.

== Works ==
=== Fiction ===
- The Violin Lover (2006)
- The Tale-Teller (2012)
- Safe as Houses (2015)
- The Discovery of Flight" (2018)

=== Poetry ===
- Complicity (1983; o.p.)
- The Power to Move (1986; o.p.)
- Henry Moore's Sheep and Other Poems (1990)
- Hide & Seek (1995)
- Running in Prospect Cemetery: New & Selected Poems (2004)
- The Smooth Yarrow (2012)
- What We Carry(2019)
- "Cathedral Grove" (2023)

=== Non-fiction ===
- The Picturesque & the Sublime: A Poetics of the Canadian Landscape (1998)
- "Artful Flight: Selected Essays" (2022)

=== Juvenile ===
- Bernadette and the Lunch Bunch (2008)
- Bernadette in the Doghouse (2011)
- Bernadette to the Rescue (2012)
