= Gérard Rabinovitch =

French philosopher

Gérard Rabinovitch (born 1948, Paris) is a French philosopher and sociologist. He is a researcher at the Centre National de la Recherche Scientifique (CNRS), member of the Center for Research on Sense, Ethics, Society and of the Center for Research on Psychoanalysis, Medicine and Society, at the University of Paris VII-Denis Diderot. He is also a regular visiting faculty member at the University of Minas Gerais (Brazil).

== Biography ==
Gérard Rabinovitch was born in Paris, France in 1948. He is the son of the resistance fighter Léopold Rabinovitch (1922–2009) who was a member of the FTP-MOI group, Compagnie Carmagnole-Liberté, deported as a Résistant to Dachau in 1944, and of Anna née Portnoï, who was a hidden child in France during WWII. Since 2008, Gérard Rabinovitch has been the Secretary General of the Prix Francine and Antoine Bernheim for Arts, Letters and Sciences.

== Philosophy ==
Gérard Rabinovitch situates his work and writings in the Weberian tradition and in consonance with political philosophy of the Frankfurt School and its related thinkers including Hannah Arendt, Walter Benjamin, Ernst Bloch, and Siegfried Kracauer. His work is also informed by clinical psychoanalysis and its implicit vision of man, as well as by the field of history

=== "Destructiveness", a concept to understand Nazism and genocide ===
Gérard Rabinovitch has developed the concept of "destructiveness" elaborating upon earlier work in phenomenological (Georg Simmel) and Weberian sociology centered on the role of emotions in society. He developed the concept of the ‘death drive’ in its hetero-destructive form (destructive urge) that has been theorized in the field of psychoanalysis and which echoes Kant's notion of Radical Evil.

In his book, De la destructivité humaine, fragments sur le Béhémoth (On Human Destructiveness: figures of the Behemoth) Gérard Rabinovitch reconsiders and criticizes the limited viewpoint of political, sociological and philosophical thinkers who have understood Nazism through the Hobbesian metaphor of the Leviathan. In the footsteps of Franz Leopold Neumann, he proposes instead, that we take up the idea of the Behemoth, the opposite of the Leviathan, to study this phenomenon. The Behemoth is a model of disorganization, chaos and criminal pleasure. Gérard Rabinovitch analyses the Nazi chimera, with its heroicisation of violence, its promotion of aggression, and the liquidation of all ethical norms. This Nazi chimera is made-up of gangster activity, of pagan inspired peasant actions, of medical biologism, and of instrumental rationality.

Using his notion of "destructiveness", Gérard Rabinovitch discusses and criticizes the central thesis of Zygmunt Bauman’s Modernity and the Holocaust, and suggests that we must go beyond the categories of instrumental reason and action. Using Freudian terms, Gérard Rabinovitch, puts forth the philosophical proposition that the Leviathan could, by excessive constraint, stand for "morbid attachments", and the Behemoth for "thanatophiliac detachments" while pointing up the nuances between attachments and detachments in life: "The distinction lies not between attachment and detachment, but in the morbid scenario or the erotic dynamic which animates them." The idea of destructiveness allows Gérard Rabinovitch to perceive, articulate and think about the similarities and differences between the practical modalities and conditions that gave rise to the Shoah and the Rwandan genocide of 1994.

=== An ethics of disillusionment ===
Building upon Freudian theory, in particular Civilization and Its Discontents, and upon his own discoveries issuing from the concept of "destructiveness", Gérard Rabinovitch reflects upon the consequences of the versatile character of destruction and our capacity to adapt it to a variety of historical situations while it remains intact. Facing this disagreeable truth—that barbarism haunts humanity—Rabinovitch works toward establishing the basis for an ethics of disillusionment, an ethics which would bolster our capacity to resist the destructiveness intrinsic to the human race.

=== Reflections on Humor ===
Rabinovitch has deepened and fleshed-out his inquiry into the ethics of disillusionment through his analyses of humor, which he sees as a veritable jewel produced by the work of our culture (Kulturarbeit). In his book, Comment ça va mal? L’humour juif, un art de l’esprit, he explores the specificity of Jewish humor, that symbol of and testimony to the existence of a specifically Jewish culture and identity, which is situated between anthropological disillusionment and messianic hope. In his second work on the subject, Et vous trouvez ça drôle?! ... variations sur le propre de l’homme, Rabinovitch pursues his reflection on humor and its ethical vocation, that of the benediction: i.e., the well-said. Analyzing the differences and similarities between the two great humorous traditions, Jewish humor and British humor, Gérard Rabinovitch throws light on the conditions that make humor possible and analyzes its civilizing effects and how it emancipates us with its lucidity. Through his research which seeks to articulate radical psychoanalytical anthropology with the recurring problems of classical political philosophy as posed by thinkers like Leo Strauss and Claude Lefort, Rabinovitch sets out new epistemological and ethical bases for us to assume our responsibilities as human subjects in the world.

== Bibliography ==
=== Books in French ===
- Éthique et environnement, direction de l'ouvrage, La Documentation Française, 1997.
- Questions sur la Shoah, éditions Milan, collection "Les essentiels", 2000.
- Le Sourire d’Isaac, L’humour juif comme Art de l’Esprit, éditions Mango/ ARTE éditions Paris, 2002.
- Abraham Joshua Heschel, un Tzaddiq dans la Cité, direction de la publication, Ed. du Nadir, collection "voix", Paris, 2004.
- Antijudaïsme et Barbarie, direction de la publication avec Shmuel Trigano, Éditions In Press, coll. Pardes n°38, 2005.
- Connaissance du Monde juif, direction de la publication avec Évelyne Martini, Éditions du CNDP/CRDP, coll. Documents, Actes et Rapports, Paris, 2008.
- Comment ça va mal ? L'humour juif, un art de l'esprit, édition Bréal, 2009.
- De la destructivité humaine. Fragments sur le Béhémoth, PUF, 2009.
- Et vous trouvez ça drôle ?!... Variations sur le propre de l'homme, édition Bréal, 2011.
- Terrorisme/Résistance. D’une confusion lexicale à l’époque des sociétés de masse, éditions Le Bord de l’eau, 2014, 72 p^{9,10.}
- Les révolutions de Leonard Cohen, direction de la publication avec Chantal Ringuet, Presses de l'Université du Québec, 2016, 292 p. (Canadian Jewish Literary Award 2017).
- Somnambules et Terminators. Sur une crise civilisationnelle contemporaine, éditions Le Bord de l’eau, 2016, 102 p.
- Leçons de la Shoah, éditions Réseau Canopé - Éclairer, 2018, 124 p.
- "Humour n'est pas sarcasme", in Rire sans foi ni loi? Rire des dieux rire avec les dieux, sous la direction de Frédéric Gugelot et Paul Zawadzki, éditions Hermann, collection "Questions sensibles", Paris, 2021, p. 233-247.
- "Avalanche", in Crise de l'autorité et de la vérité. Désagrégation du politique, direction de la publication, éditions Hermann, collection "Questions sensibles", Paris, 2022, p. 11-26. 162 p.
- Philosophie clinique. Au chevet de l’animal parlant, éditions Hermann, Paris, 2024, 101 pages. (ISBN 979-10-370-3896-8)
- "Décantations", in Murmuration, Paroles insomniaques pour des temps incertains, recueillies par Daniella Pinkstein, Amazon, 2025. p. 29-49. (ISBN 9-791041-573547)
- "Judéo-chrétien", in Encyclopédie des euphémismes contemporains, direction Sami Biasoni, éditions Le Cerf, Paris, 2025. (ISBN 9-782204-164818)
- D’une permanence païenne. Sur quelques invariants anti judaïques, éditions Le Bord de l’eau, Coll. "Altérité critique", Paris, 2025, 98.p. (ISBN 978-2-38519-1313)
- "Mir Zaynen Do!", in Critique de la raison antisémite, direction Daniel Salvatore Schiffer, Paris, éditions Intervalles. Paris, 2025.p. 165-172. (ISBN 978-2-36956-372-3)

=== Books in Portuguese (Brazil) ===
- "Schoà : Sepultos nas Nuvens", Éditora Perspectiva, coll. Khronos, São Paulo, Brésil, 2004, ISBN 85-273-0698-0.
- "Sobre uma permanéncia pagâ", in Diàlogos com Eugène Enriquez, A proposito da obra Da horda ao Estado, psicanalise do vinculo social, direction Vanessa Andrade de Barros, Teresa Cristina Carreteiro, Jacyara Rochael Nasciutti, José Newton Garcia de Araùjo, editora FI, Brésil, 2024, p. 383-417. ISBN 978-65-85958-27-1.

=== Article in English ===
- "In a Petrified World", On Robert Antelme's The Human Race, Ed. Northwestern University Press, Illinois, U.S.A., 2003, p. 131-138

=== Article in German ===
- "Von der versachlichenden, allmacht und vom wissenschtlichen denken", in Ethik und Wissenschaft in Europa (Die gesellschasftliche, rechtliche und philosophische Debatte), Verlag Karl Alber, 2000, seite 126–140, ISBN 978-3-495-47811-0

=== Books in Turkish ===
- Terorizm mi? Direniș mi?* Dire Kitle Toplumları Çağında Bir Sözlük Karmașasına Dair, *SEL YAYINCILIK / RED KITAPLIĞI, Istanbul, 2016, Translation: Ișik Ergüden, ISBN 978-975-570848-5.

=== Books in Polish ===
- Nauki płinące z Zagłady, Wydawnictwo Akademickie DIALOG, Warszawa, 2019, Translation: Grażyna Majcher, ISBN 978-83-8002-798-5

== Orders, decorations, and medals ==
- Knight of the National Order of Merit (November 2013)
- Commander of the Order of Arts and Letters (2016)
- Officer of the Order of Academic Palms (January 2020)
