= List of organists and assistant organists of Wells Cathedral =

Wells Cathedral is a Church of England cathedral in Wells, Somerset, England.

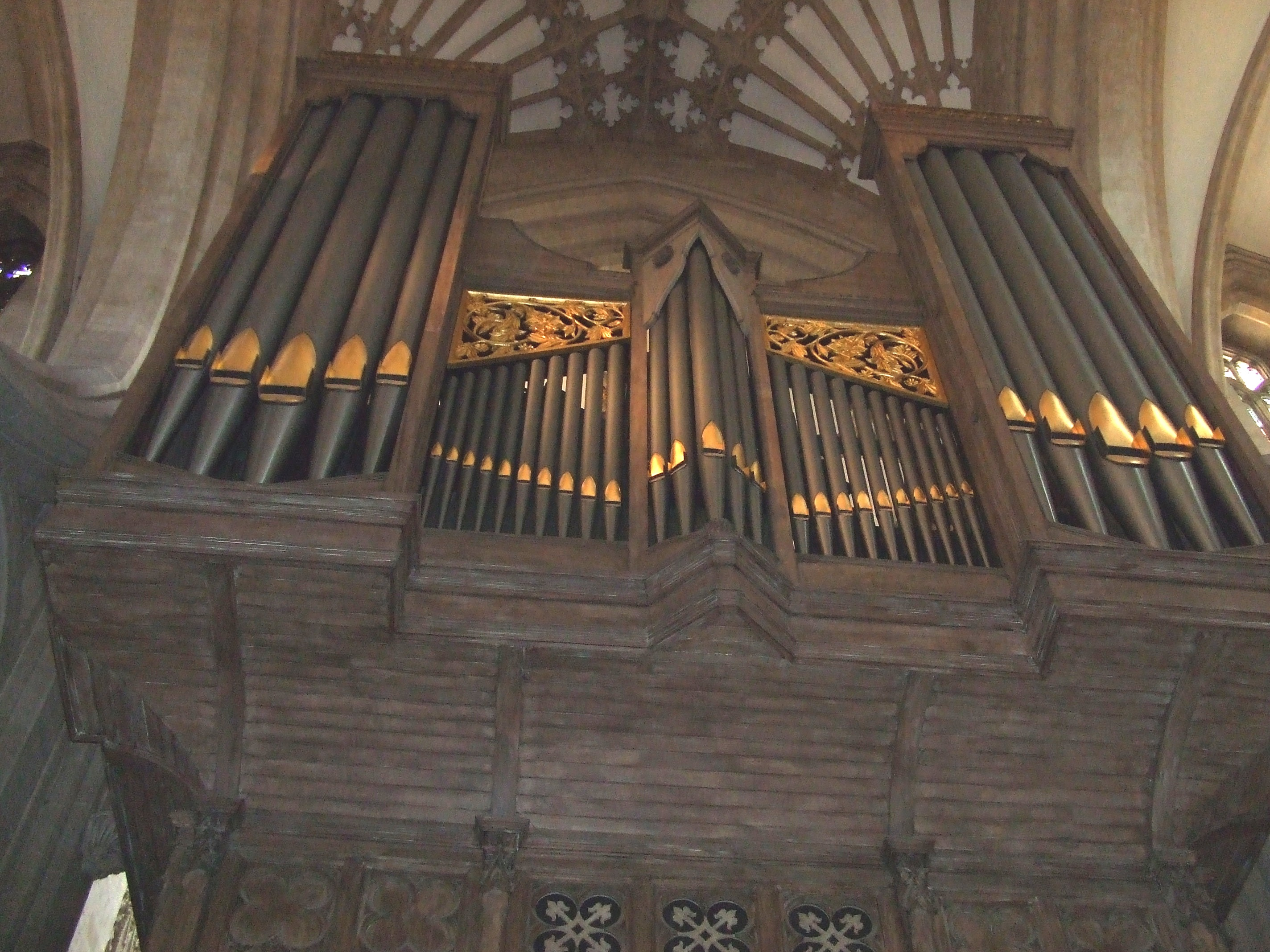
Organ seen from the crossing.

The first record of an organ dates from 1310, with a smaller organ, probably for the Lady Chapel, being installed in 1415. In 1620 a new organ, built by Thomas Dallam, was installed at a cost of £398 1s 5d, however this was destroyed by parliamentary soldiers in 1643 and another new organ was built in 1662, which was enlarged in 1786, and again in 1855. In 1909–1910 a new organ was built by Harrison & Harrison with the best parts of old organ retained, and this has been maintained by the same company since.

== Organists ==
- 1416–1418 Walter Bagele (or Vageler)
- 1421–1422 Robert Cator
- 1428–1431 John Marshal
- 1437–1462 John Marchell
- 1461–1462 John Menyman (joint)
- 1461–1462 Richard Hygons (joint)
- 1497–1507 Richard Hygons
- 1507–1508 Richard Bramston
- 1508 John Clawsy (or Clavelleshay)
- 1514 William Mylwhard
- 1515–1531 Richard Bramston
- 1534–1538 John Smyth
- 1547–1554 Nicholas Prynne
- 1556–1557 John Marker
- 1558 Robert Awman
- 1559–1562 William Lyde
- 1563 Thomas Tanner
- 1568 Matthew Nailer
- 1587 John Clerk
- 1600 Thomas Hunt
- 1608 James Weare
- 1613–1614 Edmund Tucker
- 1614–1619 Richard Brown
- 1619–1642 John Oker (or Okeover)
- 1663–1674 John Brown
- 1674 Mr Hall
- 1674–1688 John Jackson
- 1688–1690 Robert Hodge
- 1690–1712 John George
- 1713–1726 William Broderip
- 1726 Joseph Millard
- 1727–1740 William Evans
- 1741 Jacob Nickells
- 1741–1771 John Broderip
- 1771–1773 Peter Parfitt
- 1773–1781 Robert Parry
- 1781–1820 Dodd Perkins
- 1820–1859 William Perkins
- 1859–1895 Charles Williams Lavington
- 1896–1899 Percy Carter Buck
- 1899–1933 Revd. Canon Thomas Henry Davis
- 1933–1936 Conrad William Eden
- 1936–1971 Denys Pouncey, with Peter Lyons, who was Director of Music at Wells Cathedral School, as Master of the Choristers from 1954-1960.
- 1971–1996 Anthony Crossland
- 1996–2004 Malcolm Archer
- 2004–2005 Rupert Gough (acting)
- 2005–2019 Matthew Owens
- 2020–2022 Jeremy Cole (acting Organist and Master of the Choristers since 2019)

== Assistant organists ==
- Charles William Lavington 1842 – 1859
- J. Summers
- Frederick Crowe (later organist of Chichester Cathedral) c.1880
- Charles Harry Moody 1894 – 1895 (then acting organist 1895)
- Frederick William Heck 1896 – 1897 (afterwards organist of Bedminster Parish Church)
- W. J. Bown
- Richard John Maddern-Williams 1904 – 1906 (afterwards sub-organist of Norwich Cathedral).
- Kenneth J Miller 1906
- F.P. Wheeldon 1908
- Frank W. Porkess
- Marmaduke Conway 1920 – 1925 (later organist of Ely Cathedral)
- C.H. Trevor 1926 – 1927
- Conrad William Eden 1927 – 1933 (then organist)
- J.W. Martindale-Sidwell 1938
- Michael Peterson 1946 – 1953
- Hugo Langrish 1953 - 1961
- Anthony Crossland 1961 – 1970
- David Anthony Cooper 1977 – 1983 (later organist of Blackburn Cathedral)
- Christopher Brayne 1983 – 1990 (later organist of Bristol Cathedral)
- David Ponsford
- Andrew Nethsingha 1990 – 1994
- Rupert Gough 1994 – 2005
- David Bednall 2002 – 2007 (Senior Organ Scholar 2002 – 2004)
- Jonathan Vaughn 2007 – 2017
- Jeremy Cole 2017-2019
- James Gough (Acting) 2019-2020
- Alexander Hamilton, Assistant Director of Music 2020-2022
- Adam Wilson, Assistant Organist 2021-2022, Acting Assistant Director of Music 2023

== Bibliography ==
- Thornsby, Frederick W. (1926). Dictionary Of Organs And Organists. H. Logan.
