= Thomas Davis =

Thomas, Tom or Tommy Davis may refer to:

== Business ==
- Thomas E. Davis (1785–1878), British real estate developer in New York City
- Thomas Benjamin Frederick Davis (1867–1942), Jersey-born South African businessman
- Thomas Henry Davis (businessman) (1918–1999), founder of Piedmont Airlines
- Thomas J. Davis Jr. (1912–1989), American venture capitalist, founder of the Mayfield Fund
- Thomas Davis (shipwright) (?–?), English shipwright in Dutch service during the 18th century
- T. Cullen Davis (born 1933), American oil heir

== Military ==
- Thomas Davis (Medal of Honor) (1837–1919), Welsh soldier who fought in the American Civil War
- Thomas Francis Davis (1853–1935), U.S. Army general
- Thomas A. Davis (1873–1964), American founder of two military schools
- Thomas Jefferson Davis (1893–1964), U.S. Army general

== Politics ==
=== U.S. ===
- Thomas Terry Davis (died 1807), U.S. Representative from Kentucky
- Thomas Aspinwall Davis (1798–1845), American mayor of Boston in 1845
- Thomas Davis (Rhode Island politician) (1806–1895), Irish-American member of U.S. House of Representatives
- Thomas Treadwell Davis (1810–1872), U.S. Representative from New York
- Thomas B. Davis (1828–1911), U.S. Representative from West Virginia
- Tom Davis (Virginia politician) (born 1949), U.S. Representative from Virginia
- Tom Davis (South Carolina politician) (born 1960), South Carolina State Senator for Beaufort County
- Thomas Davis (Wisconsin politician) (1817–1908), Wisconsin State Assemblyman for Walworth County

=== Other countries ===
- Thomas Davis (Young Irelander) (Thomas Osborne Davis, 1814–1845), Irish writer and politician
- Thomas Davis (Australian politician) (1856–1899), New South Wales politician
- Thomas Davis (Cook Islands politician) (1917–2007), Cook Island Prime Minister and former NASA researcher
- Thomas Clayton Davis (1889–1960), Canadian diplomat, politician and judge from Saskatchewan
- Thomas Osborne Davis (Canadian politician) (1856–1917), Canadian parliamentarian

== Religion ==
- Thomas Davis (priest) (1804–1887), Church of England clergyman and hymn writer
- Thomas F. Davis (1804–1871), fifth bishop of the Episcopal Diocese of South Carolina
- Thomas Henry Davis (organist) (1867–1947), English priest and organist

== Sports ==
=== American football ===
- Thomas Davis Sr. (born 1983), American football player
- Tommy Davis (kicker) (1934–1987), American football player, 49ers kicker
- Tommy Davis (defensive end) (born 1982), American football player

=== Other sports ===
- Tom Davis (handcyclist) (born 1977), American Paralympian, 2016 Rio Paralympics
- Tom Davis (basketball coach) (born 1938), American college basketball coach
- Tom Davis (basketball player) (born c. 1970), American college basketball player
- Tommy Davis (catcher) (born 1973), American baseball catcher
- Tommy Davis (outfielder) (1939–2022), American baseball outfielder
- Thomas Davis (cricketer) (1827–1898), English cricketer
- Thomas Davis GAA, a Gaelic football club in Tallaght, County Dublin, Ireland
- Thomas Davis GFC, Corrinshego, a Gaelic football club in Corrinshego in County Armagh, Northern Ireland
- Tom Davis (footballer, born 1901) (1901–?), English association footballer
- Tom Davis (footballer, born 1911) (1911–1987), Irish association footballer
- Tom Davis (rugby union) (c. 1894–?), rugby union player who represented Australia

== Other uses ==
- Thomas Davis (chief) (1755–1837), Mohawk Chief of Davisville/Davis' Hamlet, near Brantford, Ontario
- Thomas Hoyt Davis (1892–1969), U.S. federal judge
- Tom Davis (comedian) (1952–2012), American comedy writer on Saturday Night Live
- Tom Davis (journalist) (born 1967), mental-health educator
- Tom Davis (actor) (born 1979), comedian and actor
- Tommy Davis (Scientology) (born 1972), former spokesperson for the Church of Scientology
- T. Neil Davis, professor of geophysics

== See also ==
- Thomas Davies (disambiguation)
- Thomas Henry Davis (disambiguation)
- Thomas Osborne Davis (disambiguation)
- Thomas Davis House (disambiguation), several houses in the United States
