= Broderip =

Broderip is a surname. Notable people with the surname include:

- Frances Freeling Broderip (1830–1878), English children's writer
- Francis Broderip (died 1871), lawyer and philanthropist
- John Broderip (1719–1770), English organist
- Robert Broderip (died 1808), English organist and composer
- William Broderip (organist) (1683–1726), English organist
- William Broderip, full name William John Broderip (1789–1859), English lawyer and naturalist
