= General Davis =

General Davis may refer to:

- Benjamin O. Davis Jr. (1912–2002), U.S. Air Force general
- Benjamin O. Davis Sr. (1877–1970), U.S. Army brigadier general
- Bennie L. Davis (1928–2012), U.S. Air Force general
- Dickie Davis (British Army officer) (born 1962), British Army major general
- Ed Davis (Royal Marines officer) (born 1963), Royal Marines lieutenant general
- Edmund J. Davis (1827–1883), Union Army brigadier general
- Franklin M. Davis Jr. (1918–1980), U.S. Army major general
- George R. Davis (New York politician) (1788–1867), New York State Militia general
- George B. Davis (1847–1914), U.S. Army major general
- George Whitefield Davis (1839–1918), U.S. Army major general
- Gronow Davis (1828–1891), British Army major general
- James B. Davis (general) (born 1935), U.S. Air Force general
- Jefferson C. Davis (1828–1879), Union Army brevet major general
- Jefferson Davis (1808–1889), Army of Mississippi major general
- John Davis (British Army officer) (1832–1901), British Army major general
- John Davis (Pennsylvania politician) (1788–1878), U.S. major general of militia
- John J. Davis (general) (1909–1997), U.S. Army lieutenant general
- John K. Davis (1927–2019), U.S. Marine Corps four-star general
- Jon M. Davis (fl. 1980s–2010s), U.S. Marine Corps lieutenant general
- Joseph R. Davis (1825–1896), Confederate States Army brigadier general and Mississippi National Guard major general
- Leighton I. Davis (1910–1995), U.S. Air Force lieutenant general
- Nelson H. Davis (1821–1890), U.S. Army brigadier general
- Raymond G. Davis (1915–2003), U.S. Marine Corps four-star-general
- Reuben Davis (representative) (1813–1890), Confederate States Army brigadier general
- Robert Courtney Davis (1876–1944), U.S. Army major general
- Russell C. Davis (general) (born 1938), U.S. Air Force lieutenant general
- Stephen L. Davis (fl. 1980s–2020s), U.S. Air Force major general
- Thomas Francis Davis (1853–1935), U.S. Army brigadier general
- Thomas Jefferson Davis (1893–1964), U.S. Army brigadier general
- William Church Davis (1866–1958), U.S. Army brigadier general and major general (retirement list)
- William G. M. Davis (1812–1898), Confederate States Army brigadier general

== See also ==
- General Davies (disambiguation)
- Attorney General Davis (disambiguation)
