= Thomas Frederick Davies =

Thomas Frederick Davies or Bishop Davies may refer to:

- Thomas Frederick Davies (father) (1831–1905), third bishop of the Episcopal Diocese of Michigan, 1889–1905
- Thomas Frederick Davies Jr. (1872–1936), second bishop of the Episcopal Diocese of Western Massachusetts, 1911–1936

== See also ==
- Thomas Davies (disambiguation)
