= Carling O'Keefe =

Brewing company in Canada

Carling O'Keefe was a brewing company in Canada that is now part of Molson Coors. The company's origins can be traced to Canadian Breweries, which bought the Carling Brewery in 1930 and the O'Keefe Brewery in 1934. Canadian Breweries purchased numerous other brewers, some to shut down, and some solely for their brands. In 1969, Canadian Breweries was acquired by a subsidiary of Rothmans, which renamed the company Carling O'Keefe in 1973. The company was sold in 1987, then merged with Molson in 1989.

== Predecessors ==
=== Carling 1840–1930 ===
In 1840, Thomas Carling began a small brewing operation in London, Upper Canada, selling beer to soldiers at the local military camp. When he died, his sons William and John took over, naming it the W & J Carling Brewing Co. John Carling became a prominent figure in Canadian business and politics; he was knighted in 1893 and died in 1911. The Carling Brewery then changed hands several times. In 1930, the Carling company was merged into the Brewing Corporation of Ontario, founded by E. P. Taylor.

=== O'Keefe 1862–1934 ===
Eugene O'Keefe, a banker, purchased the Hannath & Hart Brewery in 1862. By 1864, one of his partners had died, while the other (Patrick Cosgrave) left to found his own brewery. The business was renamed O'Keefe and Company. It was the first to produce lager beer in Canada, along with the traditional ale and porter. In 1891, the company was incorporated as O'Keefe Brewing Company Limited. In 1911 another new brewery was built with an annual capacity of 500,000 barrels. O'Keefe was one of the first to use trucks for beer delivery, the first to build a mechanically refrigerated warehouse, and one of the first to advertise extensively.

O'Keefe died in 1913. The company became owned by a holding company, O'Keefe Limited, controlled by Sir Henry Pellatt, Sir William Mulock and Charles Vance Millar, who served as its president until his death in 1926. O'Keefe House is the former mansion owned by Eugene O'Keefe in Toronto. It now serves as a residence for Toronto Metropolitan University. The O'Keefe brewery facility was located at Victoria and Gould streets, just east of Yonge Street. It was sold to Ryerson in 1966. The brewery was demolished and used as a parking lot for several decades, and later a Ryerson parking garage was built on-site. The site is now part of the 10 Dundas East mixed-use development, including a movie theatre used as lecture rooms by Ryerson (as part of a deal for air rights over their parking garage), a parking garage and the Ryerson book store. Other O'Keefe buildings on the east side of Victoria were converted for Ryerson's use, including the bottling plant and warehouse (built in 1953) at 122 Bond Street that became home to the School of Image Arts. The main O'Keefe's regional office building (285 Victoria Street, built 1946-48) becoming home to the Faculty of Business in 1967 until they moved into the new Ryerson Business Building (renamed the Ted Rogers School of Management) at Bay & Dundas in 2006. It is presently known as the Victoria Building.

=== Canadian Breweries 1930–1973 ===
E. P. Taylor began forming Canadian Breweries Limited (CBL) in 1930, beginning with Brading Brewery of Ottawa and Kuntz Brewery of Kitchener. Carling was merged into the-then Brewing Corporation of Ontario later that year. O'Keefe was one of the major targets, but the acquisition was not completed until 1934. Canadian Breweries Limited was a conglomerate, having purchased about 30 breweries. Some of the original brand names stayed in use during this time. The company closed some breweries, reducing its number of brands to just six in 1959. It also expanded into the United States, starting with a Carling Brewery in Cleveland, Ohio in 1934. By 1971, it had seven breweries in the United States. In the UK, it first licensed the production of Carling Black Label in 1952 to Hope & Anchor. Along with Hope & Anchor, CBL built a national brewing group starting in the late 1950s, developing Northern Breweries and Charrington United Breweries.

Taylor resigned as chairman of CBL in 1966, and CBL was sold to Rothmans of Pall Mall Canada in 1969. Under Rothmans, it began a period of consolidation and cutting costs. It closed breweries in Ottawa, Quebec and Cleveland. Faced with declining sales and profits, it renamed itself Carling O'Keefe in 1973.

== Carling O'Keefe 1973–1989 ==
As a new venture, Carling O'Keefe began making Carlsberg and distributing Tuborg in 1973. The company continued the acquisitions of the Taylor era. The company bought two more brewers: Doran's of Northern Ontario, and National Brewing of the US.

In 1981, Carling O'Keefe, responding to the entry of Budweiser by Labatt's, licensed Miller High Life beer for production in Canada. The beer, unlike its other beers was not sold in the "stubby" bottle, instead, it was sold in the long-neck clear bottle. This began the decline of the stubby, which was phased out in the 1980s.

Carling O'Keefe was bought by Elders IXL of Australia in 1987. Carling O'Keefe began bottling Elders' Foster's Lager. Carling O'Keefe merged with Molson Brewery to form Molson Breweries Canada in 1989. At the time of the merger, Molson was the second-largest Canadian brewing company, while Carling O'Keefe was third. The merger put the combined company ahead of former market leader Labatt's and made it the sixth-largest North America brewery. Seven Canadian plants were closed due to consolidation. Molson would later add US brewer Miller Brewing as a minority partner, then buy out Elders and Miller. In 2005, Molson merged with Coors to form Molson Coors Brewing Company.

Carling brands are currently owned by the Molson Coors Brewing Company. Carling O'Keefe's Toronto location on Carlingview Drive (named for the brewery) is now a Molson brewery.

=== Sponsorships and sports ===
O'Keefe, in 1969, was the first television sponsor of the Montreal Expos on CBC and remained affiliated with the team for many years, sponsoring a team MVP award in the early 1970s.

Carling O'Keefe was a major supporter of Langley Speedway, a 3/8th-mile paved stock car oval, in Langley, British Columbia. They often sponsored races and season points championships. For example, Tom Berrow was the 1976 Carling O'Keefe Super Stock Points Champion. Their Company name was painted on the front stretch of the track and was part of the "Winner's Circle" celebration.

In 1974, Carling USA sponsored a NASCAR car driven by Canadian short track driver Earl Ross and owned by former NASCAR driver Junior Johnson in the Winston Cup Series. Over the course of the season, Ross earned four top fives, nine top tens, and a single win at Martinsville Speedway en route to a ninth-place finish in the points standings.

In 1976, Carling O'Keefe became a minority partner in the Toronto Argonauts professional football team and continued to do so until 1991. Carling O'Keefe also held ownership of the NHL's Quebec Nordiques. Both franchises were sold due to the impending merger with Molson. The company, however, maintained promotional interests in both teams. In addition, during the 1980s, Carling O'Keefe was a chief sponsor for the CFL game telecasts on both the CBC and CTV (and, when CTV ceased broadcasting the CFL after 1986, the league-operated Canadian Football Network) networks.

=== Brands ===
- Carling Black Label is the best selling beer in the United Kingdom. The "Mabel, Black Label" was a well-known advertising slogan
- Carling Premier a stronger version of Carling Black Label, with an alcohol percentage of 4.7%. In cans it is sold with a widget.
- Red Cap Ale - now produced by Waterloo Brewing Company
- Old Vienna - now produced by Molson Coors
- Dominion Ale - now produced by Molson Coors

==== Licenses ====
- Carlsberg and Tuborg - made under license of Carlsberg Brewery
- Miller High Life - introduced in 1981
- Foster's Lager - introduced in 1987

==== Former brands ====
- Black Horse Ale (formerly a Dawes brand, a similarly named, but unrelated beer is made for the Nfld/Labrador market by Molson Coors)
- Dow Ale
- O'Keefe Ale
