= Dominion Hotel, Toronto =

Heritage building

Dominion Hotel
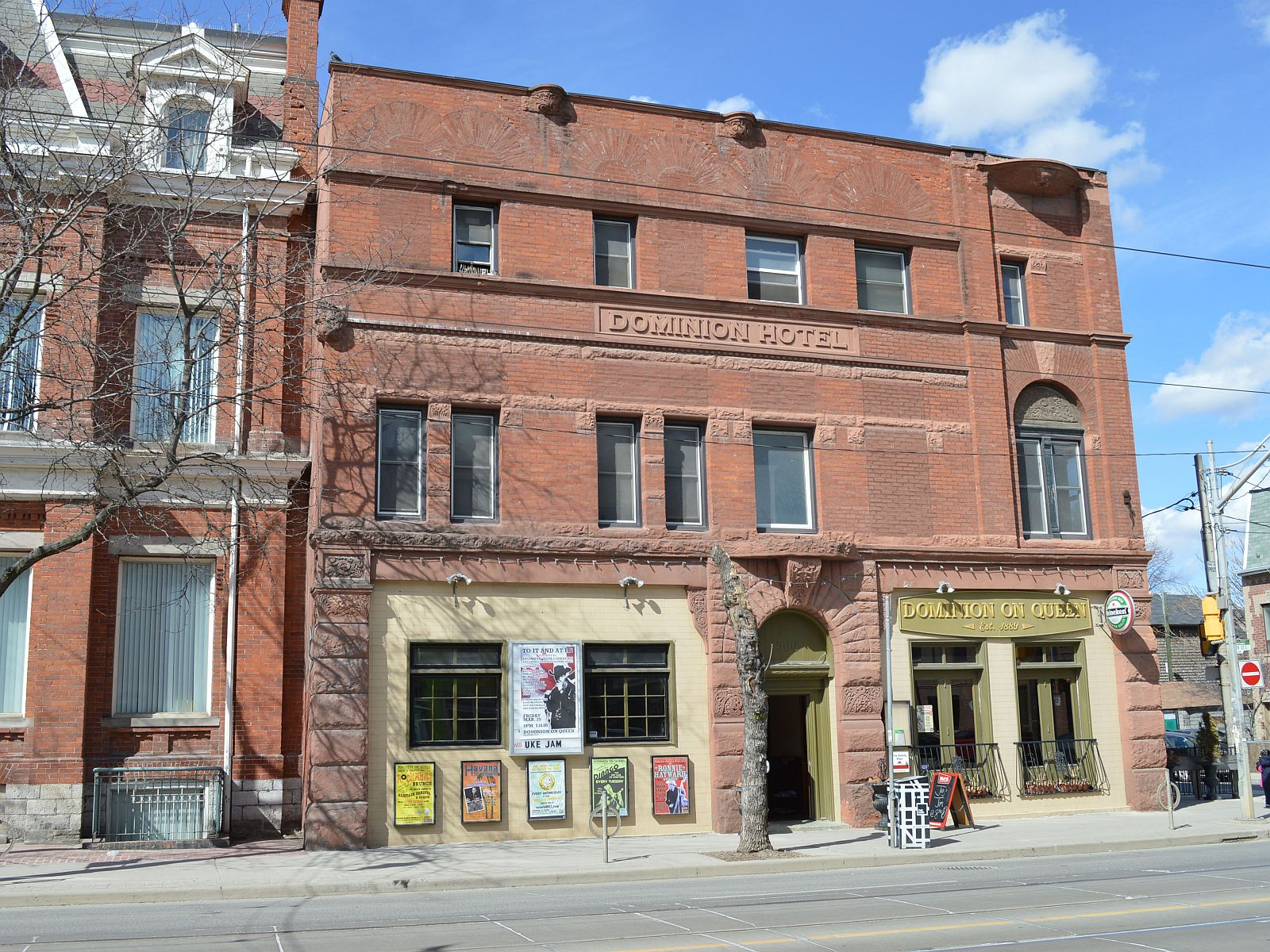
- The building in 2013, prior to restoration

General information
- Location: 498 Queen Street East; Toronto, Ontario, Canada
- Coordinates: 43°39′25″N 79°21′33″W
- Completed: 1889

Design and construction
- Architect: David Roberts Jr.

The Dominion Hotel is a historic building at 498 Queen Street East in the Corktown neighbourhood of Toronto in Ontario, Canada. As of February 2025, the building was closed for an extensive restoration and planned to reopen as a boutique hotel.

== History ==
Constructed as a hotel in 1889, the building is a historic hotel structure, and a designated heritage property. Its first owner was Robert T. Davies, who founded the Dominion Brewery to the west of the building (now Dominion Square) in 1877. Davies had previously been the manager of the nearby Don Brewery, which was owned by his relative Thomas Davies. The building's architect was David Roberts Jr. (1845–1907), who also designed the Gooderham Building (also known as the Flatiron Building) at 49 Wellington Street East.

As originally constructed, the hotel was four stories tall, had a mansard roof, and a small tower. The top floor once "boasted an elegant performance space". Around 1950, the structure lost its fourth floor, mansard roof and tower.

The hotel re-opened in 1998 as a bar, known as Dominion on Queen, which closed in 2014 for renovation work. In mid-2015, FAB Restaurant Concepts leased space on the ground floor to open Dominion Pub & Kitchen on November 30, 2015. The upper floors were used as a rooming house of 25 units. Dominion Pub & Kitchen closed in mid-2023.

In 2021, ERA Architects was engaged to restore the building and convert it into a boutique hotel. The renovated storefront would feature large windows, recessed entrances with wheelchair accessibility, large glazed openings, ornate transom windows, and a paneled base. Original interior finishes, such as metal ceiling tiles, wood paneling, and terrazzo floors, would be preserved. For the upper storeys, decorative cornices were replaced and sandstone was repaired.

== Gallery ==
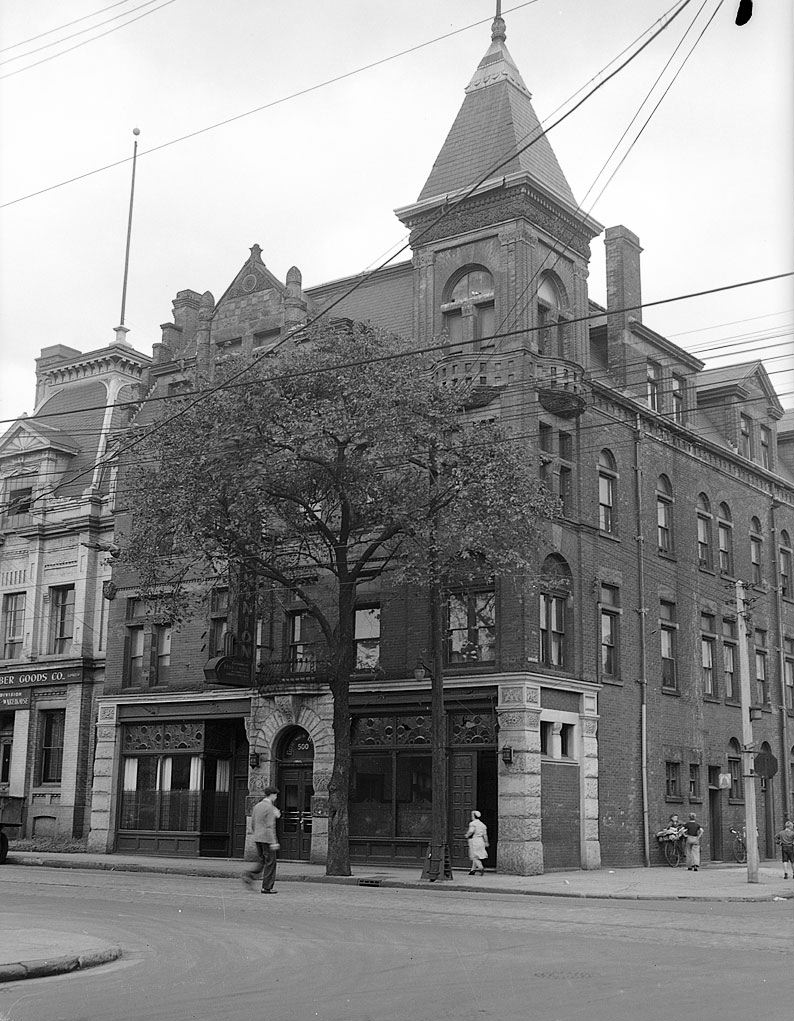
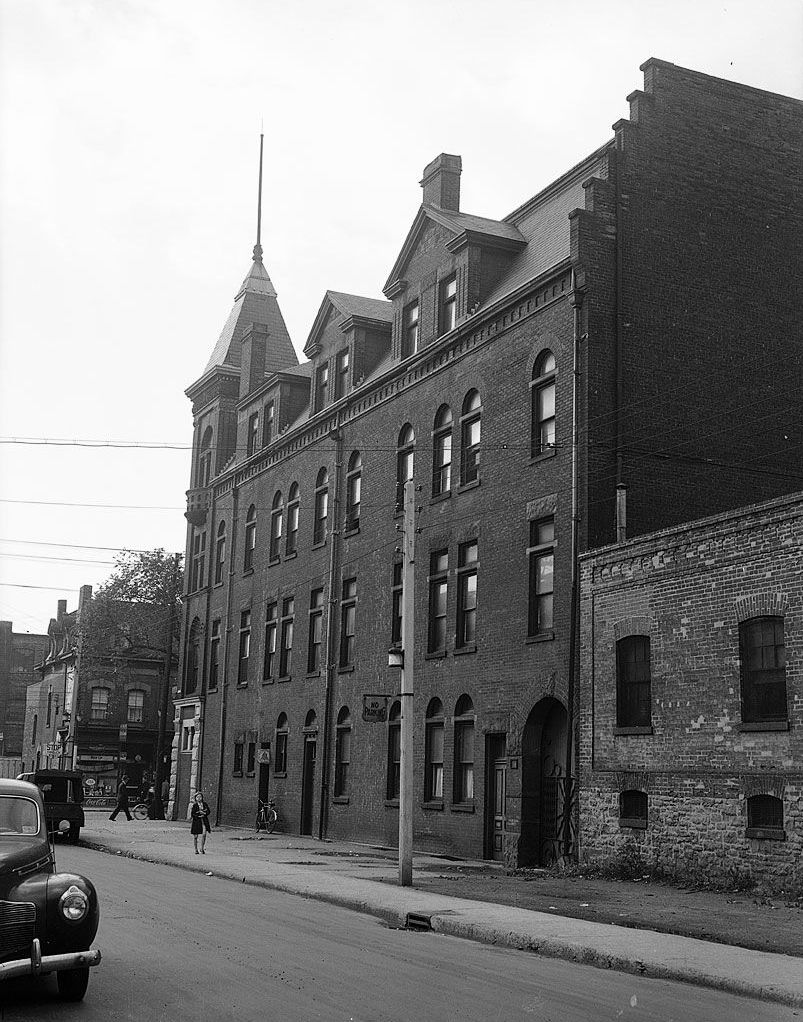
The Dominion Hotel on the northwest corner of Queen Street East and Sumach Street.
This is as the building appeared in 1945, with the fourth floor and its mansard roof and corner tower still intact. The building now has a flat roof.

== See also ==
Other boutique hotels in Toronto include:

- Broadview Hotel
- Drake Hotel
- Gladstone Hotel
