= Thomas Henry Davis =

Thomas Henry Davis may refer to:

- Thomas Henry Davis (businessman) (1918–1999), founder of the former Piedmont Airlines
- Thomas Henry Davis (organist) (1867–1947), English cathedral organist

== See also ==
- Thomas Davis (disambiguation)
