= Attorney General Davis =

Attorney General Davis may refer to:

- Fred Henry Davis (1894–1937), Attorney General of Florida
- Harwell Goodwin Davis (1882–1977), Attorney General of Alabama
- Jeff Davis (Arkansas governor) (1862–1913), Attorney General of Arkansas
- Thomas Clayton Davis (1889–1960), Attorney General of Saskatchewan

== See also ==
- Attorney General Davies (disambiguation)
- General Davis (disambiguation)
