= Peter Dickinson (musician) =

English composer (1934–2023)

Peter Dickinson (15 November 1934 – 16 June 2023) was an English composer, musicologist, author, and pianist.

== Biography ==
Dickinson was born in Lytham St Annes, Lancashire, and studied organ at Queens' College, Cambridge, where he was a student of Philip Radcliffe. In 1958 he became a student at the Juilliard School in New York City, and studied with Bernard Wagenaar, and encountered the works of experimental composers such as Cowell, Cage, and Edgard Varèse. Returning to England in 1962, he established courses in improvisation and experimental music at the College of St. Mark and St. John, Chelsea. After a lectureship at Birmingham (1966–1970), he became the first professor of music at Keele University in 1974, where he created an important centre for the study of American music. He held that position until 1984. He served as chair of music at Goldsmiths College, University of London from 1991 to 1997, and in 1996 became a Fellow and head of music at the Institute of United States Studies in London.

In July 1964, he married Bridget Jane Tomkinson. Their marriage produced two sons. As a pianist, he often performed works by Charles Ives with his sister, mezzo-soprano Meriel Dickinson, reflecting his affinity for that composer. He also accompanied several acclaimed instrumentalists, such as the violinist Ralph Holmes and oboist Sarah Francis. He also made several international lecture-recital tours.

In 1980, Dickinson became a founding member of the Association of Professional Composers and was named a Fellow of the Royal Society of Arts a year later. He was a board member of Trinity College of Music and a member of the Royal Society of Musicians. He was also chair of the Bernarr Rainbow Trust, a charity set up in 1997 for the benefit of music education.

Dickinson died on 16 June 2023, at the age of 88. His widow Bridget and their two sons survive him.

== Music ==
His musical compositions include experimental and aleatoric elements, and are compared to works by Stravinsky, Ives and Satie. Other influences include the music of John Cage, as well as ragtime, blues, and jazz. He layers both serious and popular musical styles together to create what he calls a style modulation. The composer explained his interest in combining musical styles: "Ever since hearing live performances of Charles Ives in New York in the late 1950s and first meeting John Cage there, I have been interested in the effect of hearing different types of music simultaneously." His layering is achieved in a different manner to William Bolcom's "aggressively parodic and deconstructive manner", using more of a "genuine warmth of enthusiasm for the material he is exploiting which suggests something closer to a homage.",

Dickinson composed three concertos, for organ, piano and violin. The Organ Concerto was written for the 1971 Three Choirs Festival. The Piano Concerto (dedicated to the soloist Howard Shelley) was commissioned by the Cheltenham Festival and first performed on July 22, 1984, at Cheltenham Town Hall, with the Philharmonia Orchestra conducted by Edward Downes. The Violin Concerto was commissioned by the BBC and first performed and broadcast on 27 March 1987 by the BBC Philharmonic Orchestra, soloist Ernst Kovacic, conducted by Bryden Thomson. It was recorded for the first time by the BBC in 2014 to mark the composer's 80th birthday by Chloe Hanslip with the BBC National Orchestra of Wales conducted by Clark Rundell. All three are concentrated works, in single movement form and (like much of Dickinson's music) all three have connections with popular music. The Organ Concerto includes a blues song, there's a rag in the Piano Concerto, and the Violin Concerto's opening theme combines Beethoven with a waltz and a 1930s popular song.

His instrumental compositions are for a great variety of musical ensembles, from full orchestra to a single instrument, and there are many keyboard works. He has also composed many songs for solo voice and pieces for various choral ensembles. His modern works for historical instruments are notable. He has composed for better-known historical instruments such as recorder and harpsichord, as well as for less-familiar ones, such as the clavichord and baryton. In contrast to the use of these instruments, he has also added electronic sounds to some works.

== Writing ==
A prolific writer, he had often shown his varied interests in American music. He wrote a series of articles on improvisation in 1964, and more recently has discussed postmodernism, coining the term 'style modulation' to describe the weaving together of serious and popular or past and present music. The term can be applied to his own music, which adds a mix of ragtime, jazz, serial music, and even electronic playback to more traditional types of instrumental musical forms.

== Musical compositions ==
Vocal music

Stage works

- The Judas Tree (music theatre, T. Blackburn), actors, 2 T, chorus, brass, perc, str, 1965

Choral works

- 'Jesus Christ is Risen [Born] Today', SATB, 1955
- Mag and Nunc, unison chorus, organ, 1963
- 2 Motets (Blackburn): John, Mark, ATB, 1963, rev. SATB, 1990
- Christmas is Coming, SATB, 1964
- 4 Poems (Gerard Manly Hopkins), Bar soloists, chorus, org, 1964
- Mass, SATB, 1965
- When I was a Sailor, chorus, 2 insts, perc, 1965
- For the Nativity, SATB, 1966
- Martin of Tours (Blackburn), T, Bar, chorus 2vv, chbr org, pf duet, 1966
- 3 Complaints, unison chorus, insts, perc, 1966
- The Dry Heart (A. Porter), SATB, 1967
- Communion Service, 2 pt chorus, org, 1968
- Outcry (W. Blake, J. Clare, T. Hardy), A, SATB, orch, 1968
- Late Afternoon in November (Dickinson), 16 solo vv, 1975
- A Mass of the Apocalypse, SATB, spkr, perc, pf, 1984
- Tiananmen 1989, double SATB, tubular bells, 1990

Solo vocal

- Four Songs (W. H. Auden), S, pf, 1956
- A Dylan Thomas Cycle, Bar, pf, 1959
- Let the Florid Music, T, pf, 1960
- Three Comic Songs (W. H. Auden), T, pf, 1960, rev. 1972
- An E. E. Cummings cycle, Mez, pf, 1965
- somewhere i have never travelled (W. H. Auden)Mez, pf, 1965
- Elegy (Swinburne), Ct, vc, hpd, 1966
- A Red, Red Rose (Burns), Mez, pf, 1967 [from Songs in Blue]
- 4 Poems (A. Porter), Ct, hpd, 1967
- Extravaganzas (G. Corso), Mez, pf, 1970
- So We'll go no more A-Roving (Byron), Mez, pf, 1971 [in Songs in Blue];
- Winter Afternoons (Emily Dickinson), 6 solo vv, db, 1971
- Surrealist Landscape (Lord Berners), Ct/Mez, pf, tape
- Lust (St. Augustine, Dickinson), 6 solo vv, 1974
- A Memory of David Munrow (wordless), 2 Ct, 2 rec, va da gamba, hpd, 1977
- Schubert in Blue (William Shakespeare), Mez, pf, 1977 [after Franz Schubert; in Songs in Blue]
- Songs in Blue, med voice, pf, 1977
- Reminiscences, Mez, sax, pf, 1978
- The Unicorns (J. Heath-Stubbs), S, brass band, 1982
- Stevie's Tunes (S. Smith), Mez, pf, 1984
- Larkin's Jazz, spkr/Bar, fl + a fl, cl + b cl + E cl, s sax, tpt, vc, pf, perc, 1989
- Summoned by Mother (J. Betjeman), Mez, hp, 1991
- Three Carols, SSA, 1997

Instrumental works

Orchestral works

- Vitalitas, 1959/1960
- Monologue, strings, 1959
- Five Diversions, 1969
- Satie Transformations (based on Trois Gnossiennes), 1970
- Concerto for strings, percussion, and Electronic organ, 1971 [withdrawn]
- Organ Concerto, 1971
- A Birthday Surprise (Three variations on Happy Birthday to You), 1979
- Piano Concerto, 1984
- Violin Concerto, 1986
- Jigsaws, chamber orchestra, 1988
- Merseyside Echoes, 1988

Chamber and solo instrumental

- Fantasy, cl, pf, 1956;
- Threnody, vc, pf, 1956
- String Quartet no. 1, 1958
- Air, fl, 1959
- Fantasia, vn, 1959
- 3 Juilliard Dances, fl, cl, bn, tpt, trombones, perc, pf, vc, 1959
- Sonata, vn, pf, 1961
- Baroque Trio, fl, ob, hpd, 1962
- 4 Duos, fl/ob, vc, 1962
- Music for Oboe and Chamber Organ, 1962
- Sonatina, solo bassoon, 1966
- Fanfares and Elegies, 3 tpt, 3 trombones, org, 1967
- Metamorphosis, fl, 1971
- Translations, recorder, bass viol, harpsichord, 1971
- Recorder Music, recorder, tape, 1973
- String Quartet no.2, with tape/pf, 1975
- Solo for Baryton, tape/b viol/baryton, 1976
- Aria, ob, cl, bn, hn, 1977
- Lullaby, ob/cl, pf, 1982
- The Unicorns, brass band, 1984 [arr. of vocal work], 1982–1984
- American Trio (Hymns, Rags and Blues), vn, cl, pf, 1985
- London Rags, 2 tpt, hn, trombones, tuba, 1986
- Auden Studies, ob, pf, 1988
- Cellars Clough Duo, 2 guitars, 1988
- 5 Explorations, guitar, 1989
- Suffolk Variations, guitar, 1992
- Swansongs, vc, pf, 1993
- Celebration Trio, vn, cl, pf, 2009
- Bach in Blue, vn, cl, pf, 2012
- Three Early Pieces, arr. recorder, piano, 2012

Keyboard

- A Cambridge Postlude, organ, 1953
- Postlude on Adeste Fideles, organ, 1954
- Toccata, organ, 1955
- Vitalitas Variations, piano, 1957, orchestrated for ballet, 1959
- Variations on a French Folk Tune, harpsichord, 1957
- Meditation on Murder in the Cathedral, organ, 1958
- Study in Pianissimo, organ, 1959
- Five Forgeries for piano duet (1963)
- Paraphrase 1, organ, 1967
- Paraphrase 2, piano, 1967
- Satie Transformations, piano, 1970
- Suite for the Centenary of Lord Berners, clavichord, 1972
- Conc. Rag, piano, 1973, rev. 1984
- Piano Blues, 1973
- Quartet Rag, piano, 1975
- Blue Rose, piano, 1979
- Hymn-Tune Rag, piano, 1985
- Wild Rose Rag, piano, 1985
- Blue Rose Variations, organ, 1985
- Patriotic Rag, piano, 1986
- Sonatas for piano, piano & tape playback, 1987
- A Millennium Fanfare, organ, 1999
- Bach in Blue, piano, 2004

== Written publications ==
- 'Charles Ives 1874–1954', MT, cv (1964), 347–9
- 'Improvisation', MT, cv (1964), 294–5, 377–8, 538–9, 612–13, 688–9, 766–7
- 'John Cage', Music and Musicians, xiv/3 (1965–66), 32–4, 54 only, 56 only
- 'Erik Satie (1866–1925)', MR, xxviii (1967), 139–46
- 'A New Perspective for Ives', MT, cxv (1974), 836–8
- ed.: American Music: Keele 1975
- ed.: Twenty British Composers (London, 1975) [incl. ‘Transformations of Erik Satie’, p. 47]
- 'A Note on Some Recent Works', MT, cxviii (1977), 559 only [on Dickinson's works]
- 'Recent Research on American Musical Traditions', IMSCR XII: Berkeley 1977, 353–82
- ‘The Achievement of Ragtime: an Introductory Study with some Implications for British Research in Popular Music’, PRMA, cv (1978–79), 63–76
- ‘Lord Berners, 1883–1950’, MT, cxxiv (1983), 669–72
- ‘William Schumann: an American Symphonist at 75’, MT, cxxvi (1985), 457–8
- ‘Stein, Satie, Cummings, Thomson, Berners, Cage: Toward a Context for the Music of Virgil Thomson’, MQ, lxxii (1986), 394–409
- ‘Directors of a Decade’, MT, cxxviii (1987), 15–17
- The Music of Lennox Berkeley (London, 1988; 2nd enlarged edition Woodbridge, 2003)
- ‘The American Concerto’, A Companion to the Concerto, ed. R. Layton (New York, 1989), 305–325
- ‘Style-Modulation: an Approach to Stylistic Pluralism’, MT, cxxx (1989), 208–11
- ‘Virgil Thomson (1896–1989)’, MT, cxxxi (1990), 31 only
- ‘Nationalism is Not Enough: a Composer's Perspective’, Music and Nationalism in 20th-Century Great Britain and Finland, ed. T. Mäkelä (Hamburg, 1997), 27–34
- Marigold: the Music of Billy Mayerl (Oxford, 1999)
- Copland Connotations: Studies and Interviews (Woodbridge, 2002)
- CageTalk: Dialogues with & about John Cage (Rochester, NY, 2006)
- Lord Berners: Composer, writer, Painter (Woodbridge, 2008)
- Samuel Barber Remembered (Rochester, NY, 2010)
- Lennox Berkeley and Friends: Writings, Letters and Interviews (Woodbridge, 2012)
- Words and Music (Woodbridge, 2016)
- Many other articles and reviews in the Musical Times, Music and Letters, The Musical Quarterly, The Independent, The Times Literary Supplement, Musical Opinion and The Times Higher Education Supplement
