= Philip Radcliffe =

English academic, musicologist and composer (1905–1986)

Philip FitzHugh Radcliffe (27 April 1905 – 2 September 1986) was an English academic, musicologist and composer, born in Godalming, Surrey.

== Early life ==
He was educated at Charterhouse and read Classics at King's College, Cambridge, gaining a scholarship and a First in Part I of the degree, but then only a Third in Part II, causing him to switch his attention to music, studying under Edward Dent and Henry Moule. He was a gifted pianist.

== Career ==
Philip Radcliffe had his first sight of Cambridge in December 1923 when he sat for a scholarship examination. "I attended evensong in the Chapel of my future College and can still recall the impact made upon me by the quiet, other-world sound of the choir singing Remember, O thou man." His dissertation on tonality in sixteenth and seventeenth century music developed on the work of Richard Terry and Edmund Fellowes. Radcliffe became a music fellow at King's College, Cambridge in 1931, and a lecturer between 1947 and 1972. His pupils included Philip Brett, Winton Dean, Jeremy Dibble, Peter Dickinson, Sebastian Forbes and Richard Lloyd. He lived in King's for the rest of his life, never leaving it for more than a few weeks.

His academic writings included the books Mendelssohn (1954), Beethoven's String Quartets (1965), Schubert Piano Sonatas (BBC Music Guide, 1967), a biography of John Ireland (1954), E.J. Dent: a centenary memoir (1974) and sections of Grove's Dictionary, Denis Stevens's symposium The History of Song, and the New Oxford History of Music. In 1933, at the request of T. S. Eliot, Radcliffe took over the Music Chronicle section of The Criterion from J B Trend.

His compositions include short choral pieces (such as the eight part setting of God be In My Head, Mary walked through a wood of thorn, and The Oxen) liturgical music (The Preces and Responses and Versicles and Responses), songs, and a small number of instrumental works (including the String Quartet in D major, 1939). His incidental music for the Cambridge Greek Plays included Clouds (Aristophanes, 1962) Oedipus Tyrannus (1965), Medea (Euripides, 1974), and Electra (Sophocles, 1977). Radcliffe was an active member of the Ten Club playreading society whose other members included EM Forster, Donald Beves and Noel Annan.

He died in a car accident while travelling with his sister, Susan, in France at the age of 81, while still an active Fellow of the College.
