= Maria durch ein Dornwald ging =

Christian hymn

- English: Maria walks amid the thorns
- Occasion: Advent, pilgrimage
- Text: by unknown
- Language: German
- Published: 1850

"Maria durch ein Dornwald ging" ("Maria walks amid the thorns", or literally "Mary walked through a wood of thorn") is a German Advent song. By origin it was a pilgrimage song that initially was spread orally in the 19th century, starting in the Catholic Eichsfeld.

== Versions ==
The earliest known printed version with seven stanzas was found in 1850 in the collection of hymns from August von Haxthausen and Dietrich Bocholtz-Asseburg. The actual origin of the song is unclear. Occasionally this song is dated in the 16th century, which at least may not be proved. However, in the Andernach Hymnal of 1608 a song "Jesus and his mother tender" was printed with the note "to the tune of Maria went through this forest", in which sometimes a nucleus of this Advent song is suspected.

Songbooks of the German Youth Movement at the beginning of the 20th century increased the song's popularity, but they also contributed to its transformation from the pilgrimage origin to an Advent hymn. In 1910, the song appeared in the today well-known three-stanza version initially published in the Jugenheimer Liederblatt. In 1912, the song was absorbed by the collection Der Zupfgeigenhansl and, in 1914, issued in the songbook Der Spielmann created by Klemens Neumann, co-founder of the Catholic youth movement Quickborn. In the Gotteslob, the current common prayer- and hymnbook of Catholic dioceses in Germany, Austria, and South Tyrol, the song is published as no. 224.

There is a choral setting of the carol in English, "Mary walked through a wood of thorn", by the composer Philip Radcliffe.

The carol was translated to Irish by a schoolteacher, Tadhg Ó Séaghdha, under the title 'Chuaigh Muire tríd an draighneach críon'. Ó Séaghdha was the choirmaster in the churches of Ros an Mhíl and an Tulach in County Galway. Feeling there was a dearth of Irish language Christmas carols he took it upon himself to translate carols from European languages to Irish. Twelve carols, including 'Maria durch ein Dordwald ging' feature on the 2013 CD 'Carúil Nollag', recorded by the choir Cór Chois Fharraige.

== Text ==
The first three stanzas describe the visit of Mary to Elizabeth with Jesus "under her heart" as recorded in the Gospel of Luke, Luke 1:39–56. The dead thorn wood, a symbol of infertility and death, begins to bloom when Mary walks through it with the divine child. The other stanzas deal in question and answer format with the catechetical mystery of the incarnation of Jesus.

Maria durch ein Dornwald ging,
Kyrie eleison.
Maria durch ein Dornwald ging,
der hat in sieben Jahrn kein Laub getragen.
Jesus und Maria.

Was trug Maria unter ihrem Herzen?
Kyrie eleison.
Ein kleines Kindlein ohne Schmerzen,
das trug Maria unter ihrem Herzen.
Jesus und Maria.

Da haben die Dornen Rosen getragen,
Kyrie eleison.
Als das Kindlein durch den Wald getragen,
da haben die Dornen Rosen getragen.
Jesus und Maria.

Maria walks amid the thorns,
Kyrie eleison,
Maria walks amid the thorns,
Which seven years no leaf has born.
Jesus and Maria.

What 'neath her heart doth Mary bear?
Kyrie eleison,
The little Child doth Mary bear,
Beneath her heart He nestles there.
Jesus and Maria.

Lo! roses on the thorns appear!
Kyrie eleison,
As the two are passing near,
Lo! roses on the thorns appear!
Jesus and Maria.

Mary walked through a wood of thorn
Kyrie eleison.
Mary walked through a wood of thorn,
Which seven long years no leaf had borne;
Jesus and Mary.

What bore Mary beneath her heart?
Kyrie eleison.
A little child without any smart
Mary bore beneath her heart,
Jesus and Mary.

Then roses sprang from out the thorn;
Kyrie eleison.
As the Christ child through the wood was borne,
Roses sprang from out the thorn;
Jesus and Mary.
