= Dominion Brewery =

Coordinates: 43.65694°N 79.35925°W

The Dominion Brewery was a brewery in Toronto, Ontario, Canada. It operated from 1878 until 1936.

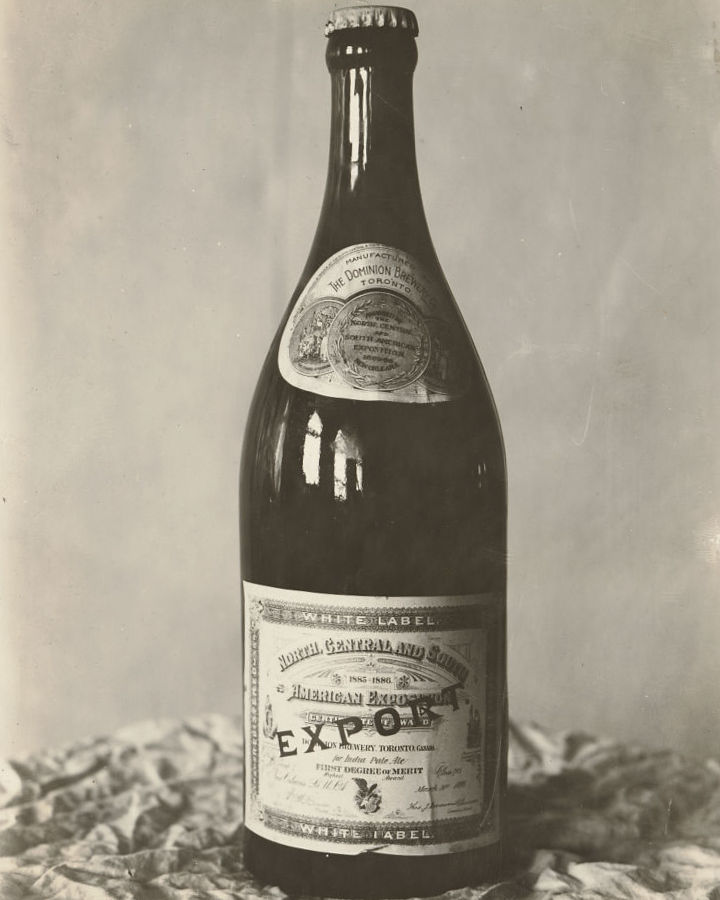
Bottle of Dominion White Label Export India Pale Ale, 1914

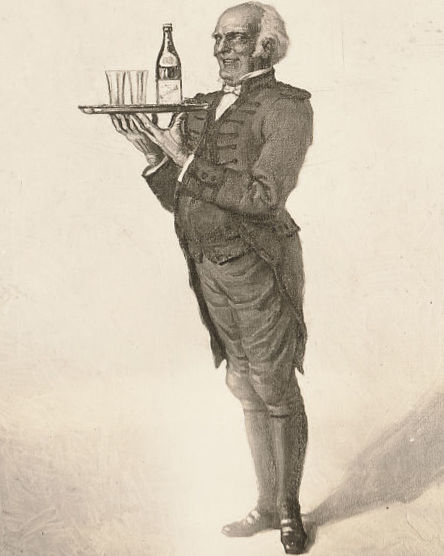
Dominion Brewery advertisement, 1914

The brewery was founded by Robert T. Davies in 1877. Davies had been a manager at his brother Thomas' brewery, the Don Brewery on the Don River at Queen Street East in Toronto. The new brewery opened in 1878, built less than two city blocks away, on Queen Street just west of Sumach Street. Davies had brewed ale and porter varieties, but hired German experts to make lager. The name of the brewery was synonymous with its aim, to be available across Canada, which stretched more Ontario east to the Maritimes. The brewery won awards in 1885 at a competition in New Orleans and continued to enter its products in competitions, with the awards prominently displayed on the labels of the bottles. Being especially proud of its win for an India pale ale product, the label of the beer was replaced with a replica of the award certificate and renamed White Label Ale. By 1888, the brewery shipped over one million gallons of beer annually.

The brewery was sold in 1891 to British interests for CA$1.2 million, and Davies remained its managing director until 1900, when he retired from the brewing business. In 1926, the brewery was sold to the Hamilton Brewing Association, which owned the Regal Brewery in Hamilton, becoming part of the acquisitions forming Canadian Brewing Corporation. In turn, Canadian Brewing Corporation was merged in 1930 with the Brewing Company of Ontario (later Canadian Breweries) conglomerate being set up by E. P. Taylor. In 1936, Taylor moved production of Davies' beer to the Cosgrave Brewery. Cosgrave founded in 1860s would be acquired by O'Keefe Brewery in 1945.

The brewery's west wing and south main wing are both still in existence, having been converted to commercial space in 1981. The nearby Dominion Hotel, was operated for a number of years as an affiliated business; as of February 2025, major renovation work was being completed to convert the establishment into a boutique hotel.
