= Richard Hey Lloyd =

British organist and composer (1933–2021)

Richard Hey Lloyd, 1963

Richard Hey Lloyd (25 June 1933 – 24 April 2021) was a British organist and composer.

== Biography ==
Richard Lloyd was born near Stockport, Cheshire, the younger of two children of Charles Yates Lloyd, an accountant, and his wife Ann Lloyd (née Hey). He was a chorister of Lichfield Cathedral (1942–47) and was educated at Rugby School (1947–51) where he held a music scholarship. He studied at Jesus College, Cambridge, where he was an organ scholar (1952–55). His teachers included Peter Le Huray, Philip Radcliffe and Patrick Hadley. He took the Music Tripos and held the Cambridge degree of MA as well as the FRCO and ARCM diplomas.

After National Service he was organist and choirmaster at SHAPE near Paris. From 1957 to 1966 he was assistant organist of Salisbury Cathedral under Christopher Dearnley. In 1966 he was appointed Organist and Master of the Choristers of Hereford Cathedral. He was chief conductor at the Hereford Three Choirs Festival in 1967, 1970 and 1973. In 1974 he moved to Durham on his appointment as Organist and Master of the Choristers of Durham Cathedral. In 1985 he became deputy headmaster of Salisbury Cathedral School. Ill health forced his early retirement in 1988.

In later life Lloyd resided in Leominster, Herefordshire. After retiring, he divided his time between examining (he was an examiner for the ABRSM for 44 years) and composing. Other titles and positions which he held were Mem. Council, RCO, 1974–93. FRSA, and Hon FGCM 2006.

"Lloyd devoted much of his life to composition and his distinctive choral music can be heard regularly at services all over the world." "Composing was always a central part of his musical life; he produced around 600 compositions and arrangements, many of which were written during his time in Durham. He has been an inspiration to many musicians, writing accessible, beautifully crafted music of very high quality for both parish and cathedral choirs." According to Gramophone (magazine), Richard Lloyd's music “stands out as some of the most rewarding church music of our time”. In 2010 he received a Fellowship (FRSCM) of the Royal School of Church Music.

He died in Hereford on 24 April 2021 after a short illness and is survived by his wife Teresa Morwenna (née Willmott, whom he married in 1962) and four daughters.

== A selection of compositions and publications ==
=== Choral music ===
- Adam our Father (SATB, Encore Publications)
- A Garland of Praise (SATB, Encore Publications)
- A Prayer (Treble voices/Organ, Alfred Lengnick, 1973)
- Drop down ye Heavens. The Advent prose. (SATB/Organ, Cathedral Music, 1979) See also: Rorate caeli
- Epiphany Responsory (TB (or cantor) SATB/Organ, Encore)
- Fill thou my life (Kevin Mayhew)
- Give The King Thy Judgements, O Lord (SATB/Organ, unpublished)
- God be in my head (SATB or ATB, Encore Publications)
- God is love (SATB/Organ, 1987, Banks Music Publications)
- God of peace (in Five Modern Anthems Set 2, Kevin Mayhew)
- Grant to your servants O God (Kevin Mayhew)
- Great Lord of Lords (SATB/Organ, Encore Publications)
- Hereford Mass (SATB/Organ, Novello, 1991)
- Into a quiet world (SATB, 1969, published as: All so still, Alfred Lengnick, 1972)
- I saw three ships (SATB, Novello)
- I sing the birth was born tonight (SATB, unpublished, 2010)
- It was upon the twelfth day (SATB with soli, Encore Publications)
- King of Glory (in Five Modern Anthems Set 1, SS/Organ, Kevin Mayhew)
- Kindle a light to lighten the darkness (SATB/Organ, Encore Publications)
- Lord, it belongs not to my care (in New Anthem Book, vol. 3, Kevin Mayhew)
- Lord, who hast formed me (SATB)
- Magnificat & Nunc Dimittis. The Carlisle Service. (SATB/Organ)
- Magnificat & Nunc Dimittis. The Durham Service. (SATB/Organ, Encore Publications, 1991)
- Magnificat & Nunc Dimittis. The Hereford Service. (SATB/Organ, Novello, 1983)
- Magnificat & Nunc Dimittis. The Salisbury Service. (SATB/Organ, RSCM)
- Magnificat & Nunc Dimittis. The Peterborough Service. (SATB/Organ)
- Magnificat & Nunc Dimittis. The St Hild Service. (SATB/Organ)
- Now sing a Saviour's birth (SATB, Novello, 1956)
- O God, who through the Grace of Thy Holy Spirit (SATB, Encore Publications)
- Open our hearts (SATB, unpublished)
- Preces & Responses (Hereford) (SATB, Novello, 1975)
- Preces and Responses, Set 2 (Durham) (SATB, Encore Publications, 1995)
- Preces and Responses for ATB (Cathedral Music, 1991)
- Preces and Responses for trebles (Cathedral Music, 1991)
- Sarum New (Hymn, Anglican Hymn Book, 1965)
- Spirit of God (SATB/Organ, RSCM)
- St Matthew Passion (for soprano and tenor/baritone/bass soloists, SATB/Organ, Encore Publications)
- The Ballad of the Judas Tree (Basil Ramsey/Banks Music Publications)
- The Call (Come, my way, my truth, my life) (SATB, RSCM)
- The Fairest Flower (SATB, Encore Publications)
- The Gate of Heaven: 12 short anthems and introits (SATB, Encore Publications)
- The Reproaches (SATB, Encore Publications)
- The Song of the Angels (SATB/Organ, Encore Publications)
- The Spirit of Truth/Gracious Spirit, Holy Ghost (2 anthems for SATB, Encore Publications)
- The Windows (Lord, how can man preach thy eternal word?) (SATB, Church Music Society, Oxford University Press, 1995)
- Thee we adore (SATB, Encore Publications)
- To Christ, the Prince of Peace (SATB/Organ, Encore Publications)
- View Me Lord (SATB, 1963, Novello)
- Virtue (SATB, RSCM)
- What songs are these? (SS/Piano or Organ, Basil Ramsey/Banks Music Publications, 1982)

=== Organ compositions ===
- Church Parade
- 100 Processionals and Recessionals (Kevin Mayhew Publishers)

=== Arrangements ===
- The Linden Tree (arr. Richard Hey Lloyd, SATB, Encore Publications)
- Were you there? (arr. Richard Hey Lloyd, SATB, Encore Publications)

=== Descants ===
- Hit the Roof. 100 descants by Malcolm Archer, Christopher Gower, Richard Lloyd, Thomas McLelland Young and Harrison Oxley (Kevin Mayhew Ltd)

=== Editions ===
- A Treasury of European Service Music for Manuals. Ed. by Richard Lloyd. (Kevin Mayhew Publishers)
- A Treasury of European Service Music for Organ. Ed. by Richard Lloyd. (Kevin Mayhew Publishers)
- Fanfare for the Common Man and Other Favourites for Organ. Arr. by Richard Lloyd. (Kevin Mayhew Publishers)
- Fanfare for the Common Man and Other Favourites for Piano. Arr. by Richard Lloyd. (Kevin Mayhew Publishers)
- Fantasia on a Theme by Thomas Tallis. Arr. by Richard Lloyd. (Kevin Mayhew Publishers)
- Favourite Anthems Book 5 (Kevin Mayhew Publishers)
- Five French Toccatas for Organ. Ed. by Richard Lloyd. (Kevin Mayhew Publishers)
- Intermezzo and Other Favourites for Clarinet. Arr. by Richard Lloyd. (Kevin Mayhew Publishers)
- Intermezzo and Other Favourites for Cello. Arr. Richard Lloyd. (Kevin Mayhew Publishers)
- Intermezzo and Other Favourites for Flute. Arr. Richard Lloyd. (Kevin Mayhew Publishers)
- Intermezzo and Other Favourites for Violin. Arr. Richard Lloyd. (Kevin Mayhew Publishers)
- Last Verses for Manuals. Arr. Richard Lloyd. (Kevin Mayhew Publishers)
- Spartacus and Other Favourites for Organ. Arr. by Richard Lloyd. (Kevin Mayhew Publishers)
- Ultimate Carol Book For Choir. Feat. Richard Lloyd. (Kevin Mayhew Publishers)

== Articles ==
The Church Music of Herbert Howells, Address given at the Annual General Meeting of The Church Music Society, 16 June 1982 by Richard Lloyd

== Recordings ==
- The Choristers of Hereford Cathedral. Dir. by Richard Lloyd. Robert Green, Organ and Piano. Abbey Records FE 648. 1968
- Hereford Cathedral Organ played by Richard Lloyd. Abbey Records FE 649. 1968
- In Quires and Places. No. 6. The Choir of Hereford Cathedral. Dir. by Richard Lloyd. Robert Green, Organ and Harpsichord. Abbey Records LPB 696. 1972
- Carols from Durham Cathedral. Dir. by Richard Lloyd. Alan Thurlow, Organ. Abbey Records MVPC 800. 1978
- In Quires and Places. No. 26. Durham Cathedral Choir. Dir. by Richard Lloyd. Alan Thurlow, Organ. Abbey Records LPB 795. 1978
- Souvenir Cassette: Durham Cathedral. Side 2:Durham Cathedral Choir. Dir. Richard Lloyd, Acc. Alan Thurlow. Produced by Keith Allan & Helen Pickles. Recorded 7 July 1979.
- English Cathedrals & their Music, #6: Salisbury Cathedral. Dir. Richard Seal. Recorded 1979. BBC Broadcast 14 August 1981.
- English Cathedrals & their Music, #7: Durham Cathedral. Dir. by Richard Lloyd, with Assistant Organist Alan Thurlow. Recorded 1979. BBC Broadcast 21 August 1981
- Durham Cathedral choir. Dir. by Richard Lloyd. Ian Shaw, Organ. Brendan Hearne Recordings/York Ambisonic HAC (and HAR) 832. 1983
- Nearer, my god, to thee and other hymns. Durham Cathedral Choir. Dir. by Richard Lloyd. Ian Shaw, Organ – Brendan Hearne Recordings/York Ambisonic HAC 852. 1985
- British Church Composer Series – 8: [Choral music by] Richard Lloyd. The Bede Singers. Dir. David Hill. Priory PRCD838. 2007
- Ilumine me. Choral Works by Richard Lloyd. The Bede Singers. Dir. David Hill with Ian Shaw and Daniel Hyde. Regent Records Ltd. 2016

== Literature ==
- The Organists and Organs of Hereford Cathedral: Watkins Shaw and Roy Massey. Hereford: Hereford Cathedral Organ Committee, 2005. First published in 1976.

Cultural offices
Preceded by Melville Cook	Master of the Choristers and Organist Hereford Cathedral; 1966–1974	Succeeded by Roy Massey
Preceded by Conrad Eden	Master of the Choristers and Organist Durham Cathedral; 1974–1985	Succeeded by James Lancelot
