= Canadian Breweries =

Canadian brewing conglomerate

Canadian Breweries Limited
- Industry: Brewing
- Founded: 8 March 1930
- Successor: Renamed Carling O'Keefe in 1973
- Headquarters: O'Keefe Building, 297 Victoria Street, Toronto, Ontario

Canadian Breweries Limited (CBL), originally the Brewing Corporation of Ontario, was an Ontario-based holding company in the brewing industry. The company was founded in 1930 by a merger of two breweries, Brading of Ottawa and Kuntz of Kitchener-Waterloo. Under the direction of its top executive, E. P. Taylor, the company bought or merged many of the smaller competitors existing after the repeal of prohibition. The new company closed many plants, reduced the number of beer brands and built new, larger plants to produce enough beer for a much larger geographic area. By the 1950s, the company had reduced the number of beer brands from approximately one hundred to six. Canadian Breweries became part of a large conglomerate of manufacturing and consumer businesses controlled by the Argus Corporation in 1945.

Canadian Breweries was one of the "Big Three" Canadian brewers (along with Labatt and Molson) that dominated the Canadian beer market for many years. In 1969, Canadian Breweries was acquired by a subsidiary of Rothmans, which renamed the company as Carling O'Keefe in 1973. After some changes of ownership, the company merged with Molson, which later merged with Coors to form the Molson Coors Beverage Company in 2005. Molson Coors continues to produce Carling brand beers, including Carling Black Label and Old Vienna. Another brand, Red Cap, based on Carling Red Cap, is brewed by the Waterloo Brewing Company.

== Canadian Breweries ==
In 1928, E. P. Taylor's family owned the Brading Brewery of Ottawa, a brewer since 1867. Taylor presented a plan to the directors to capitalize on the recent legalization of alcohol in Ontario. Brading, while brewing in Ontario, had previously only sold its beer in Quebec. Taylor had studied the brewing business in Ontario. In 1928, there were 37 breweries in Ontario. They operated at below capacity and many were in need of modernization. They were not profitable in general and had only CA$12 million in sales on assets of CA$24 million. Quebec was dominated by three breweries, one of which, National Breweries, had consolidated 14 breweries that had operated before World War I. Taylor proposed a similar strategy to Brading's board of directors – acquire and merge with successful breweries in Ontario, and acquire and close other breweries to bring under its control some 70% of the volume of beer sold in Ontario. While the stock market crash of 1929 meant that the plan could not be funded by securities, Taylor proposed selling stock in Brading when acquiring firms. The strategy changed in 1930, when Taylor met Clark Jennison, representing British interests, who was able to invest CA$500,000 in Canadian breweries.

Taylor and Jennison incorporated the Brewing Corporation of Ontario (BCO) in March 1930 by merging Brading Breweries Limited with Kuntz Brewery of Waterloo, Ontario, backed by CA$500,000 from the British interests of Industrial General Trust and Atlas Investment Trust. Immediately, BCO acquired British American Brewing Company (a Windsor, Ontario brewery founded in 1882) and Taylor & Bate of St. Catharines, founded in 1834. In August, the company merged with Canadian Brewing Corporation Ltd, which owned Dominion Brewery in Toronto and the Regal Brewery in Hamilton. Later that year, Taylor negotiated the purchase of Carling Brewing Co. (founded in 1840 in London, Ontario) from the Dominion Bank, which had gotten control when the company needed money to continue. In October 1930, the company changed its name to Brewing Corporation of Canada Ltd. to reflect its objectives.

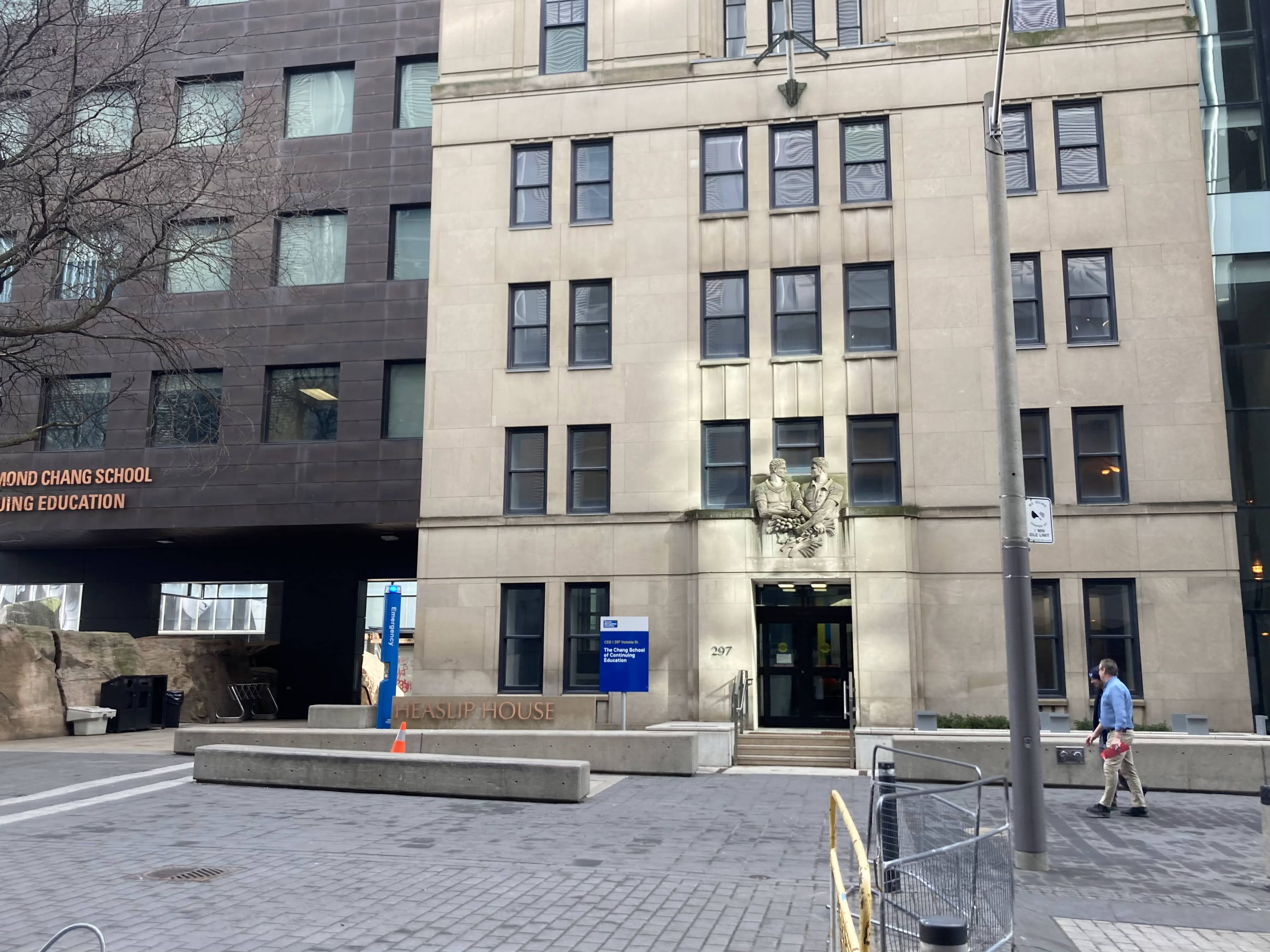
O'Keefe House, the company's 1939 headquarters building at 297 Victoria Street in Toronto, designed by Chapman and Oxley. It is now called Heaslip House and is owned by Toronto Metropolitan University.

Even when Canadian provinces prohibited alcohol consumption, federal law did not affect production for export. For some breweries, particularly those close to the U.S. border, a period of prosperity existed during Prohibition in the United States. Taylor also served as Vice President of Burmuda Export Co., a brewery industry company that aimed to control prices and exports of beer.

Taylor's expansion was aggressive and, during the 1930s and 1940s, his holding company acquired about thirty Canadian brewers. In 1931, it purchased Budweiser Brewing Company of Canada, located in Belleville. That same year, co-founder Jennison died, and Taylor purchased his shares. Continuing the acquisitions process, Taylor made an unsolicited takeover offer to the Cosgrave Brewery and threatened a potential price war. The offer was rebuffed, but Taylor persisted and the Brewing Corporation started purchasing Cosgrave stock on the open market. By the end of 1934, it had a controlling share of 80%. The pace of acquisitions and consolidations caught up with the company. It had to halt its drive in 1932 and return to its London investors to secure an operating loan when their bank refused a CA$800,000 line of credit and called in their debt. The Depression also had an effect on beer sales. With unemployment at 19%, beer sales dropped to 16 per cent of capacity from 25 per cent. The Brewing Corporation posted no profits from 1930 to 1934.

In 1934, the company purchased O'Keefe Brewery outright for CA$2.07 million. The purchase had to be financed, and this time the funds were raised through Scottish investor John Paul and the London investors. The O'Keefe Brewery on Victoria Street in Toronto would remain in use until 1966, when production was moved to a new plant in northwest Toronto. Also in 1934, the Windsor Riverside Brewery was acquired through the purchase of securities held by its banker. The brewery was immediately wound up, its sales picked up by Brewing Corporation's British American Company, located in Windsor.

The business was not limited to Canada. The Peerless Motor Company's James A. Bohannon approached Taylor to seek the rights to Carling beer in the United States. In exchange for 25,000 shares of Peerless, which exited the automobile business, Bohannon's Cleveland, Ohio brewery became Carling Inc. (Cleveland) and began brewing Carling brand beer under license. The US business would eventually grow to seven breweries by 1971 when the company closed the Cleveland plant. The US business was sold in 1979 to Heileman Brewing Co., which was itself sold to the Pabst Brewery in 1996.

In 1935, the conglomerate posted its first profit. The next step was to consolidate the brewing plants. Dominion Brewery was closed, its production transferred to Cosgrave. Taylor & Bate was closed, its production transferred to the Regal Brewery in Hamilton. Carling was closed, its production moved to the Kuntz plant. The company changed its name to Canadian Breweries Limited in 1937. That year, the company gained control of Canadian Bud Brewery in Toronto, although the company did not own 100% of its shares until 1943 when its brands were discontinued and the plant became part of O'Keefe. In 1952, the company took over National Breweries in Quebec and converted Frontenac Brewery to Carling Brewery (Quebec) Ltd. By 1959, the company had fully rationalized its brand lineup down to six brands: Black Label, Old Vienna, O'Keefe Ale, Dow Ale, Black Horse Ale and Red Cap.

In 1944, the company opened Victory Mills to alleviate a wartime shortage of vegetable oil in Canada. The company selected a location at the eastern end of Toronto Harbour and built a CA$25 million plant for the processing of soybeans. At the time, Canada did not produce enough soybeans for its own consumption, but this would change after the opening of the plant. Victory would also build a CA$4 million malt processing plant to supply Canadian Breweries. Canadian Breweries would also purchase Dominion Malting of Manitoba in 1944 when its main supplier announced it would close down in 1945. It was sold in 1954 to Procter & Gamble. The plant operated until 1991. The abandoned mill silos remain on the site which is mostly used today for parking.

In 1945, the Argus Corporation was formed to hold Taylor's and other interests in Canadian Breweries, Canadian Food Products and others. One notable executive was George Montegu Black II, the father of Conrad Black.

After the purchases of Frontenac Brewery in 1951 and National Brewery of Quebec in 1952, the Canadian Restrictive Trade Practices Commission launched an investigation into the company, later charging Canadian Breweries with being part of an illegal combine by its participation in a series of mergers that were a detriment to the public by lessening price competition. The case was heard in the Ontario Court of Queen's Bench in the fall of 1959 by Chief Justice McRuer as Regina v. Canadian Breweries Limited. The company's successful defence argued the rules did not apply to liquor sales, a business sector where prices were already regulated through legislation. During this period, the breweries set the prices which the provinces routinely approved and used their warehousing operations to control independent competitors and keep out foreign competition, particularly that of the US. The products of the "Big Three" of Canadian, Labatt and Molson tasted more alike and, starting in 1961, came in standardized "brown stubby" bottles.

In 1952, Taylor had worked out a deal with the Hope & Anchor brewery in England, whereby Hope & Anchor would produce and distribute Carling Black Label in the UK, while Hope & Anchor's Jubilee Stout would be brewed and sold by Canadian Breweries in Canada. In 1958, the two breweries made plans to make a national brewing group in England, similar to Canadian Breweries. In 1960, the group merged Hope & Anchor, Hammonds United and John Jeffrey and Company of Scotland into Northern Breweries of Great Britain Ltd. Taylor would purchase or merge eight UK breweries, among them George Younger and Son, John Fowler and Co., William Murray and Company, Webbs (Aberbeeg) and Calder and Company. The acquisitions completed, the company name was changed to United Breweries Limited. In 1961, the company bought up five more brewers, including Hewitt Brothers. In 1962, the group merged with the large Charrington Brewery, becoming Charrington United, the third-largest brewery group. The company would continue making new mergers in 1963 and 1964, including Woodhead's Brewery, Lyle and Kinahan Limited, and Old Bush Mills Distillery Co.

In 1965, Ian R. Dowie resigned as president of CBL. He had been with the firm since 1929, had been president of Carling from 1951, and president of CBL since 1958. Profits were down 3.4 per cent while sales had increased 3.6 per cent. From 1965, Canadian Breweries was headed by president J. G. (Jack) Campbell, an accountant. In 1966, Taylor, now 65, stepped down as chairman of CBL, although he remained a director. Later in 1966, CBL sold its plants and office buildings (the former O'Keefe plants and buildings) in downtown Toronto to Ryerson Polytechnical Institute for CA$3.5 million, ending a long period of brewing at the location dating back to 1846. CBL consolidated its brewing at its 1961 plant by the Toronto airport and moved its head offices into new buildings near St. Clair and Yonge Streets in Toronto.

In 1966, CBL opened a new Carling subsidiary in Hong Kong. It consisted of a CA$2.1 million plant that could produce 500,000 barrels annually. In 1967, CBL completed its plan to create a major brewing group in the UK. The Charrington United brewer merged with the Bass Brewery, forming Bass Charrington, a £200 million concern. It was the largest brewing concern in the United Kingdom, with 19 per cent of the market, plus overseas sales of Bass and Charrington beers.

In 1968, the Argus-owned shares of Canadian Breweries Limited, amounting to 10% of CBL stock, were sold to Rothmans of Pall Mall Canada Ltd. for CA$28.8 million. For the purchase, Rothmans borrowed 50% from its corporate parent, and 50% from the Bank of Montreal. Rothmans considered merging with CBL later in 1968 as a way to increase its stake to 50%; however, it abandoned the merger plan a few months later. In 1969, Rothmans had to fight off a hostile takeover by US tobacco firm Philip Morris. Philip Morris offered CA$130 million for 50% of the shares. Rothmans opposed the bid, and Philip Morris increased its bid to $15 per share, but Rothmans spent CA$116 million (CA$70 million in one week alone) to purchase enough of the company's stock on the open stock market to increase its stake to 50% and kill the takeover attempt. Rothmans' acquisition spree was funded by other Rothmans companies overseas. This ended Taylor's association with CBL.

Rothmans began a CA$21 million program of plant consolidation. Later in 1969, CBL began closing its Ottawa brewing operations, closed a brewery in Quebec and moved production among its plants for a projected saving of CA$2.85 million annually. Campbell, who had stayed on as CBL president after the Rothmans purchase, retired in June 1969, staying on as a director. The Windsor Carling brewery closed in September 1969.

The Rothmans management decided to cut its ownership involvement with Bass Charrington in 1970, selling its 5 per cent ownership share. Its also divested its Hare Place holding company for £15.5 million.

== Carling O'Keefe ==
By 1973, CBL profits were again in decline and it initiated an internal shakeup. Rothmans renamed Canadian Breweries Limited for its two largest subsidiaries as Carling O'Keefe. The company bought two more brewers: Doran's of Northern Ontario, and National Brewing of the US. The company also acquired the Canadian license to make and distribute Carlsberg beer and distribute Tuborg brands in North America.

In 1987, Rothmans decided to sell its 50 per cent share in Carling O'Keefe, which was not meeting expectations. Later, the company was controlled by Elders IXL, which merged the company with Molson. The merger, which now controlled 53% of the Canadian market, allowed the new company to close plants in seven provinces. In 2005, Molson would merge with the US-based Coors Brewery to form Molson Coors Brewing Company.

== Acquired companies ==
- The Brading Breweries (Ottawa) (merged 1930, closed 1970)
- Kuntz Brewery (Waterloo) (merged 1930)
- Grant's Spring (Hamilton) (merger 1930, closed 1932)
- Budweiser Brewery of Canada (Belleville) (acquired 1930, closed 1936)
- Taylor & Bate (St. Catharines) (acquired 1930, closed 1938)
- Regal Brewing (Hamilton) (merger 1930, closed 1938)
- Dominion Brewery (Toronto) (acquired 1930, closed 1936)
- British American Brewing Company (Windsor) (acquired 1930)
- Carling Brewing (London) (acquired 1930)
- Rock Brewery, Geo. Bernhardt, Preston, Ont.
- O'Keefe (Toronto) (acquired 1934)
- Cosgrave Export Brewery (Toronto) (acquired 1934)
- Welland Brewery (Welland) (acquired and closed 1934)
- Riverside Brewery (Windsor) (acquired and closed 1935)
- Canada Bud Breweries Ltd (Toronto) (stock control 1936, closed 1943 and merged into O'Keefe)
- Capital Brewing (Ottawa) (acquired 1944, merged into Brading)
- Bixel Brewery (acquired 1944)
- Walkerville Brewery (acquired 1944)
- Frontenac Brewery (Quebec) (acquired 1951)
- National Breweries (Montreal; acquired 1952)
  - Boswell Brewery (closed 1952)
  - Dow Breweries
  - Dawe's
- Brewing Corporation of America (1952; originally partnership with Peerless)
- Western Canada Breweries: (1953)
  - Vancouver Breweries
  - Drewry's
- Grant's Brewery (Manitoba) (acquired 1954)
- Bohemian Maid (Edmonton) (acquired 1961)

== Brands ==
- Black Horse Ale (Dawes/Dow/National in Quebec)
- Carling Black Label - now produced by Molson Coors
- Cincinnati Cream or Cinci (Windsor, then Carling)
- Dow Ale (Dow/National)
- O'Keefe Double Stout
- O'Keefe Extra Old Stock
- Old Stock (Brading)
- Old Vienna - an American beer licensed, now produced by Molson Coors
- Red Cap Ale - now produced by Waterloo Brewing Company

== See also ==
- Beer in Canada
