= Southern Maid (horse) =

American-bred Thoroughbred racehorse

- Sire: Plaudit
- Grandsire: Himyar
- Dam: Sally K
- Damsire: Mirthful
- Sex: Filly
- Foaled: 1911
- Country: United States
- Colour: Black
- Breeder: John E. Madden
- Owner: Robert T. Davies
- Trainer: John Nixon
- Record: not found
- Earnings: $10,698

Major wins
- Endenwold Stakes (1913); Victoria Stakes (1913); Fort Erie Niagara Stakes (1913); Nursery Plate (1913)

Awards
- American Champion Two-Year-Old Filly (1913)

Southern Maid (foaled 1911 in Kentucky) was a Thoroughbred Champion racehorse and successful broodmare who raced in Canada and the United States. Bred by John E. Madden, one of the most influential breeders in American horse racing history, her sire was the 1898 Kentucky Derby winner, Plaudit. Grandsire Himyar was also the sire of U.S. Racing Hall of Fame inductee Domino.

Purchased by Canadian businessman Robert T. Davies of Toronto, Southern Maid was trained by future Canadian Horse Racing Hall of Fame inductee John Nixon. In 1913, Southern Maid was the dominant filly in racing, both in Canada and the United States. She regularly beat her male counterparts in races that drew some of the best horses in North America. Her wins included the Victoria Stakes at Old Woodbine Race Course in Toronto, and the Nursery Plate at the Hamilton Jockey Club course in Hamilton, Ontario, in which she defeated Edward R. Bradley's colt Black Toney. Up against another field dominated by males, Southern Maid ran second to H. P. Whitney's colt, Pennant, in the Futurity Stakes, held that year at Saratoga Race Course.

Southern Maid's 1913 performances earned her retrospective American Champion Two-Year-Old Filly honors and, in the pre-Sovereign Award era, the de facto Canadian Champion Two-Year-Old Filly. Racing at age three, Southern Maid met with limited success.

== Breeding record ==
Southern Maid served as a broodmare for the Davies family Thorncliffe Stable. She notably foaled:

- Captain Scott - won the 1921 Coronation Futurity Stakes
- South Shore - 1922 winner of Canada's most prestigious race, the King's Plate.
- Trail Blazer - won the 1923 Breeders' Stakes

== Pedigree ==
Pedigree of Southern Maid
Sire Plaudit	Himyar	Alarm	Eclipse
Sire Plaudit	Himyar	Alarm	Maud
Sire Plaudit	Himyar	Hira	Lexington
Sire Plaudit	Himyar	Hira	Hegira
Sire Plaudit	Cinderella	Tomahawk	King Tom
Sire Plaudit	Cinderella	Tomahawk	Mincemeat
Sire Plaudit	Cinderella	Manna	Brown Bread
Sire Plaudit	Cinderella	Manna	Tartlet
Dam Sally K	Mirthful	Hagioscope	Speculum
Dam Sally K	Mirthful	Hagioscope	Sophia
Dam Sally K	Mirthful	Sister Cheerful	Petrarch
Dam Sally K	Mirthful	Sister Cheerful	The Nun
Dam Sally K	Unsightly	Pursebearer	Scottish Chief
Dam Sally K	Unsightly	Pursebearer	Thrift
Dam Sally K	Unsightly	Hira Villa	Himyar
Dam Sally K	Unsightly	Hira Villa	Tolima
