= Attorney General Davies =

Attorney General Davies may refer to:

- John C. Davies (lawyer) (1857–1925), Attorney General of New York
- John Mark Davies (1840–1919), Attorney General of Victoria

== See also ==
- William Rees-Davies (judge) (1863–1939), Attorney General of Hong Kong
- Attorney General Davie (disambiguation)
- Attorney General Davis (disambiguation)
- General Davies (disambiguation)
