= Robert T. Davies =

Canadian racehorse owner

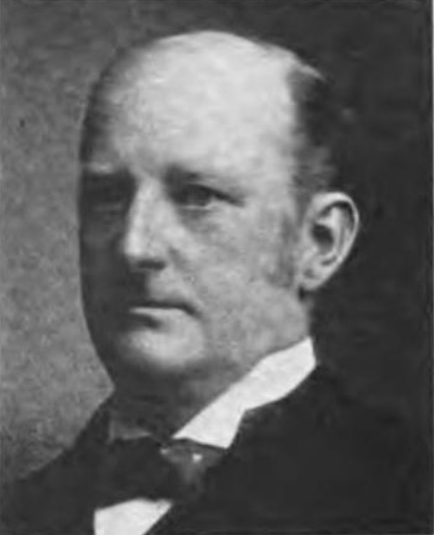
- Born: May 19, 1849; Toronto, Canada West
- Died: March 22, 1916 (aged 66); Toronto, Ontario
- Resting place: Mount Pleasant Cemetery, Toronto
- Education: Upper Canada College
- Occupations: Businessman; Racehorse owner/breeder
- Spouse: Margaret Matilda Taylor
- Children: George (b. 1875), Carolyn (b.1878), Robert (b. 1879), Louise (b. 1883), Norman (b. 1886), Adelia (b. 1888), Wilfred (b. 1889), Melville (b. 1891), Leslie (b. 1895)
- Honors: Canadian Horse Racing Hall of Fame (2001)

Robert T. Davies (May 19, 1849 – March 22, 1916) was a Canadian businessman, as well as a Thoroughbred and Standardbred racehorse owner and breeder.

== Life and career ==
Born in Toronto, he studied at Park School and Upper Canada College. In the early 1870s, Davies married Margaret Matilda Taylor, the daughter of John Taylor, owner of paper mills in Todmorden Mills, Ontario, just north of Toronto. By the turn of the century, they had nine children and owned a large home at 244 Don Mills Road (now Broadview/O'Connor) in Todmorden Mills, which they called "Chester Park".

Davies' brother Thomas Davies owned the Don Brewery at Queen Street near the Don River, which Robert helped manage. In 1877, Robert Davies founded the competing Dominion Brewery only two blocks to the west on Queen Street. Ten years later, his success led to the selling of shares in the company to a group of investors arranged by a banking house in London, England.

In 1901, after his wife's family encountered financial difficulties, Davies acquired most of the Taylor family's holdings in the Don Valley, including two paper mills and the Don Valley Brick Works. By the time of his death in 1916, Davies was one of the wealthiest people in Toronto.

== Horse racing ==
As a boy, Davies developed a love for horse racing and for a while was a jockey in Thoroughbred flat racing. In 1865 at the racetrack in London, Ontario, the then sixteen-year-old rode in that year's edition of the Queen's Plate. He soon turned to training his own horses and at age twenty-two raced and trained Floss, which won the 1871 edition of the Plate. The following year, a horse he bred named Fearnaught won the Plate. As of 2008, Davies is the only person ever to ride in the Queen's Plate as well as own, train and breed winners of that race.

Davies purchased the filly Southern Maid from a Kentucky breeder, John E. Madden. A daughter of 1898 Kentucky Derby winner Plaudit, Southern Maid was voted the retrospective American Champion Two-Year-Old Filly of 1913. As a broodmare for the Davies family, she produced the 1922 King's Plate winner South Shore.

In 1888, Davies had purchased a large property in the Don Valley from his father-in-law, on which he established a breeding operation that he dubbed Thorncliffe Farms. He raced horses both in Thoroughbred flat racing and in harness racing under the nom de course of Thorncliffe Stable.

Davies served as president of the Canadian Horse Breeder's Association. A vice-president of the Ontario Jockey Club from 1895 to 1904, he unsuccessfully lobbied for the lifting of the rule that prevented horses foaled outside of the province of Ontario from competing in the King's Plate.

== Death and legacy ==
In 1916, Davies died at "Chester Park" and was buried at the Mount Pleasant Cemetery in Toronto. For his contributions to the industry, he was inducted in 2001 into the Canadian Horse Racing Hall of Fame, in the Builders category. His estate sold Thorncliffe Farms to a group of investors from Baltimore, Maryland, who built Thorncliffe Park Raceway on the site.

Davies' Dominion Brewery complex at Queen Street East and Sumach Street continued until 1936. The brewery complex was renovated from 1987 to 1990 and is now called Dominion Square (and used by Vistek as commercial office space), while the old Dominion Hotel is now home to the pub Dominion on Queen.
