= Thomas Davies =

Thomas Davies may refer to:

== Arts and literature ==
- Thomas Davies (bookseller) (c. 1713–1785), London-based Scottish bookseller
- Thomas Nathaniel Davies (1922–1996), Welsh artist
- T. Glynne Davies (1926–1988), Welsh poet, novelist and broadcaster
- Tom Davies (born 1990), British YouTuber better known as GeoWizard

== Law and politics ==
- Thomas Henry Hastings Davies (1789–1846), British member of parliament for Worcester
- Thomas Davies (Conservative politician) (1858–1939), British member of parliament for Cirencester and Tewkesbury, 1918–1929
- Thomas Davies (Australian politician) (1881–1942), Australian politician

== Religion ==
- Thomas Davies (bishop) (c. 1511–1573), Welsh clergyman, bishop of St Asaph, 1561–1573
- Thomas Frederick Davies Sr. (1831–1905), third bishop of the Episcopal Diocese of Michigan, 1889–1905
- Thomas Frederick Davies Jr. (1872–1936), second bishop of the Episcopal Diocese of Western Massachusetts, 1911–1936

== Science and medicine ==
- Thomas Davies (died 1615), English physician and Lumleian lecturer
- Thomas Davies (physician) (1792–1839), Welsh physician
- Thomas Stephens Davies (c. 1794–1851), British mathematician

== Sports ==
=== Association football (soccer) ===
- Thomas Davies (footballer, born 1865) (1865–1902), Oswestry Town F.C. and Wales international footballer
- Thomas Davies (footballer, born 1872) (1872–1950s), Druids F.C. and Wales international footballer
- Tom Davies (footballer, fl. 1894–1911), English footballer who played for Burslem Port Vale
- Tom Davies (footballer, born 1882) (1882–1967), English footballer who played for Swindon Town, Nottingham Forest, Reading and Southampton
- Tom Davies (footballer, born 1992), English professional footballer
- Tom Davies (footballer, born 1998), English professional footballer
- Thomas Davies (footballer, born 2003), Welsh professional footballer

=== Rugby ===
- Mervyn Davies (rugby union) (Thomas Mervyn Davies, 1946–2012), Welsh rugby union player
- Tom Davies (rugby union, born 1986), Welsh rugby union player
- Tom Davies (rugby union, born 1993), Welsh rugby union player
- Tom Davies (rugby league) (born 1997), English rugby league footballer

=== Other sports ===
- Thomas Davies (bowls), Welsh lawn bowls player
- Tom Davies (American football) (1896–1972), American football player and coach
- Tommy Davies (1920–1998), Welsh welterweight boxer

== Others ==
- Thomas Davies (?–1869), see Don Brewery
- Thomas Davies (British Army officer) (c. 1737–1812), Royal Artillery officer, artist, and naturalist
- Thomas Alfred Davies (1809–1899), American Civil War general

== See also ==
- Thomas Davis (disambiguation)
- Evan Thomas Davies (disambiguation)
