= Thomas Osborne Davis =

Thomas Osborne Davis may refer to:

- Thomas Osborne Davis (Canadian politician) (1856–1917), Saskatchewan parliamentarian
- Thomas Davis (Young Irelander) (1814–1845), Young Ireland writer and politician

== See also ==
- Thomas Davis (disambiguation)
