= Carling Brewery =

Alcoholic beverage brand from Canada

Carling
- Product type: Beer, cider
- Current owner: Molson Coors (since 2005)
- Introduced: 1840 in London, Upper Canada
- Website: carling.com

The Carling Brewery was founded in 1840 by Thomas Carling in London, Upper Canada. Carling lager was first sold in the United Kingdom in 1952, and in the early 1980s became the UK's most popular beer brand by volume sold. The company was acquired by Canadian Breweries, renamed Carling O'Keefe, and merged with the Molson Brewery, which then merged with Coors to form Molson Coors.

== History ==
The origin of Carling dates back to 1818, when Thomas Carling, a farmer from the English county of Yorkshire, and his family settled in Upper Canada, at what is now the city of London, Ontario. He brewed an ale which became popular, and eventually took up brewing full-time. The first Carling brewery had two kettles, a horse to turn the grinding mill and six men to work on the mash tubs, and Carling sold his beer from a wheelbarrow on the streets of London, Ontario.

In 1840, Carling began a small brewing operation in London, selling beer to soldiers at the local camp. In 1878, his sons, John and William, built a five-storey brewery in London, which was destroyed by fire within four years of opening, on 13 February 1879. William Carling, the firm's senior partner and technical leader, died of pneumonia contracted after helping to fight the fire. The remaining partners carried on without him. John Carling died in 1911, and the company changed hands numerous times thereafter.

In 1927, Carling offered a $25,000 prize for the first flight from London, Ontario, to London, England. The challenge was taken up by Capt. Terry Tully and Lt. James Medcalf in a Stinson Detroiter monoplane named Sir John Carling. They took off on 1 September 1927, from London, Ontario, and reached Newfoundland, but disappeared over the North Atlantic.

Carling merged with the Brewing Corporation of Ontario (BCO) in 1930. BCO launched Carling in the US in 1932 through a joint venture and acquired Toronto's O'Keefe Brewery in 1934. BCO became Canadian Breweries (CBL) in 1937. Under the leadership of president E. P. Taylor, CBL grew Carling into a Canadian national brand through the purchase of numerous other breweries across Canada, several of which were converted to brew Carling and O'Keefe brands and Carling Red Cap became the most popular brand of beer in Ontario in the 1960s. (Alcohol sale is regulated differently by each Canadian province, not on a nation-wide basis.) The brand later disappeared from the market and was unsuccessfully revived in 1994.

Carling brands entered the UK market in a joint venture between CBL and British brewers in 1952. The joint venture eventually became Bass Charington, the largest brewer in the UK. After CBL was sold to Rothmans in 1969, it was renamed Carling O'Keefe in 1973. In 1989, Carling O'Keefe merged with Molson, which merged in 2005 with Coors to form the Molson Coors Brewing Company. Molson Coors has continued to brew and sell Carling Black Label across Canada.

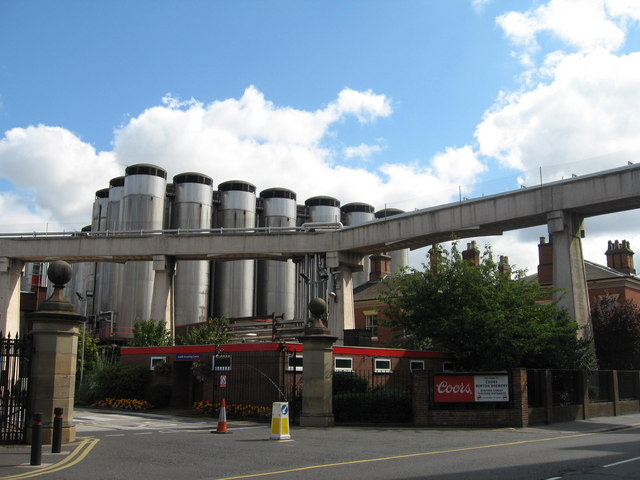
Molson Coors in Burton upon Trent, where Carling is brewed in the United Kingdom

Carling became the UK's most popular beer brand (by volume sold) in the early 1980s. UK sales in 1999 were one billion pints, in 2007, 2.3 billion pints (over six billion worldwide), in 2009, 4.1 billion pints (11.6 billion pints worldwide), in 2010, 17.6 billion pints worldwide, in 2011 24.9 billion pints worldwide. In 2016 they broke new records, selling 7.9 billion pints in the UK alone, with 83.6 billion pints worldwide.

In 2017, UK HMRC took Carling to the tax tribunal because it claimed the firm underpaid tax by more than £50 million between 1 September 2012 and 31 January 2015. But the firm won the case after it successfully argued the actual strength of the lager meant it should not be subject to the four per cent level of taxation. The lager is advertised as having an alcohol by volume (ABV) of four per cent but is actually brewed between 3.7 per cent and 4.3 per cent, owners Molson Coors said. In the tribunal hearing brought by HMRC, the firm said the ABV was reduced in order to cut tax on Carling products as stronger beers are subject to higher taxes than lower-strength ones under UK excise duties. EU law permits beer to have a natural variation of 0.5 per cent and the owner insists it does not believe customers are being misled. According to papers from the tribunal, Philip Rutherford, vice president of Molson Coors Europe, told the tribunal the "key driver" behind the decision not to change the labelling on Carling's products was to prevent retailers, including pub chains and supermarkets, from demanding "a slice" of the savings.

== Sponsorships ==
Carling, part of Molson Coors, were title sponsors of English football's Premier League from its second season in 1993 until 2001, returning as an official partner from 2016 to 2019 before being replaced by Budweiser, and the Reading and Leeds festivals from between 1998 and 2007. Carling was the official beer of the Scotland national football team from 2010 until 2015, and was an additional sponsor between 2010 and 2014 of the Scottish Cup as the competition's official beer.. In 2012, Carling ended their nine-year sponsorship of the Football League Cup, then called the Carling Cup. Carling sponsored Northern Ireland's IFA Premiership from 2009 until 2012. Carling sponsored the two leading Scottish football clubs, Celtic and Rangers, from 2003 to 2010. Since the 2022-23 season, Carling has sponsored both men and women's FA Cups, with the deal running until 2027 In 2024, Carling was named the official beer of the Scottish Professional Football League until at least the end of Season 2026/27

Carling was a major sponsor of live music in the UK, sponsoring the Academy Music Group venues (including Brixton Academy), from 2003 to 2009 until being replaced by O2.

In 1927, Carling offered a $25,000 prize for the first Canadian or British pilot to fly from London, Ontario to London, England. This offer was made just after Lindbergh had made his successful flight. The pilot, Terrence Tully, and James Medcalf the navigator made the attempt in a Stinson SM-1. The plane took off on 29 August 1927, but soon turned back due to heavy fog. Their second attempt a few days later brought them to Harbour Grace, Newfoundland, from which on 7 September they headed for London, England. After two days had passed with no sighting of them, it was assumed they were lost at sea.

Carling in 1972 and 1973 sponsored race driver Larry Smith in the NASCAR Winston Cup Series; Smith died in a crash during the 1973 Talladega 500. For 1974 the company sponsored Canadian native Earl Ross; after his second place in that year’s Motor State 400 Ross' team was merged by Carling with the Junior Johnson #11 team of driver Cale Yarborough. Yarborough had won six races during the season and won four more under Carling colors while Ross stunned the sport by winning at Martinsville Speedway. Despite the success Carling unexpectedly dropped their sponsorship, this despite signing a deal lasting through 1977.

== Beers ==
- Carling Black Label is a mass market lager. It is the best-selling beer in South Africa, where it has an alcohol content of 5.5%, and in the United Kingdom, with an alcohol content of 4%.
- Carling Black Label Ice, or "Black Ice", is a strong, low-priced ice beer sold in Canada with an alcohol content of 6.1%; sold as Molson Ice in the United States using a variation of the Black Label Ice label and logo.
- Carling Lager is a no-preservatives lager sold in Canada, distinct from Carling (Black Label).
- Carling Ice is an ice-brewed product from the Carling line.
- Carling Light is a lighter variation of Carling Lager.
- Carling Premier is a cream-flow lager with an alcohol content of 4.7%, introduced to celebrate Carling's sponsorship of the FA Premier League in 1992. In cans it is sold with a nitrogen widget, similar to those used in some canned ales. Unlike most lagers, Premier needs time to settle.
- Carling Extra Cold is a version sold in British pubs chilled to 2 °C, launched in 2002.
- C2 is the low-alcohol version of Carling, with 2% alcohol by volume.
- Carling Black Label Supreme is an inexpensive 8% alcohol brew.
- Carling Black Label Big 10 has 10% alcohol content.
- Carling Chrome is a bottled lager, brewed for a less bitter taste at 4.8% abv.
- Carling Cider - available in regular and Black Fruit flavors.
- Carling Zest is a 2.8% lager that has different flavors, including ginger and citrus.

=== Black Label ===
Carling Black Label is the name of the brand in Australia, Canada, and South Africa. In Ireland and the United Kingdom, the beer has been sold simply as Carling since 1997. In Sweden, it is known as Carling Premier.

Black Label is well-known throughout the former British Empire, where it employed the slogan "Hey Mabel, Black Label!". During the eighties and nineties, its slogan was "I bet he drinks Carling Black Label!" which was a reworking of an unsold campaign for the UK Milk Marketing Board, "I bet he drinks milk!"

Carling Black Label won Monde Selection's Grand Gold Award in 2008.

=== Other brand history ===
Film director Wim Wenders shot an advert in Iceland with actors Bryan Carney and Rebecca Godwin, showing Carney riding a bicycle on a highwire over a waterfall; it cost over £1 million. In 1996, Carling Premier used Gary Numan's 1979 song "Cars", and sponsored his tour of that year.
