= General Davies =

General Davies may refer to:

- Clinton W. Davies (1899–1989), U.S. Air Force brigadier general
- Francis Davies (British Army officer) (1864–1948), British Army general
- Henry Eugene Davies (1836–1894), Union Army brigadier general
- Henry Lowrie Davies (1898–1975), British Indian Army major general
- Henry Rodolph Davies (1865–1950), British Army major general
- Peter Ronald Davies (born 1938), British Army major general
- Philip Davies (British Army officer) (born 1932), British Army major general
- Richard Hutton Davies (1861–1918), New Zealand Military Forces major general
- Thomas Davies (British Army officer) (c. 1737–1812), British Army lieutenant general
- Thomas Alfred Davies (1809–1899), Union Army brigadier general and brevet major general
- William W. Davies (USMC) (1900–1985), U.S. Marine Corps major general

== See also ==
- Henry Ferguson Davie (1797–1885), British Army general
- William Richardson Davie (1756–1820), U.S. Army brigadier general
- William Gabriel Davy (1780–1856), British Army general
- Attorney General Davies (disambiguation)
- General Davis (disambiguation)
