= Attorney General Davie =

Attorney General Davie may refer to:

- Alexander Edmund Batson Davie (1847–1889), Attorney General of British Columbia
- Theodore Davie (1852–1898), Attorney General of British Columbia

== See also ==
- Thomas Davy (politician) (1890–1933), Attorney-General of Western Australia
- Attorney General Davies (disambiguation)
