= Conrad William Eden =

English cathedral organist (1905–1995)

Conrad William Eden, TD (1905–1995) was an English cathedral organist, who served in Wells Cathedral and Durham Cathedral.

He was born in 1905 in Alton, Hampshire, and was a chorister at Wells Cathedral. He won a scholarship to Rugby School, another to the Royal College of Music and an exhibition which took him to St John's College, Oxford, as college organist. A short period as organist of St. Philip and St. James and director of music at the Dragon School, Oxford, ended with a fractured skull. After his recovery he went as assistant organist at Wells Cathedral where in 1933 he was appointed organist and master of the choristers. In 1936, he moved to Durham Cathedral.

Assistant organist of:

- Wells Cathedral 1927–1933

Organist of:

- Wells Cathedral 1933–1936
- Durham Cathedral 1936–1974

Cultural offices
| Preceded by Revd. Canon Thomas Henry Davis | Organist and Master of the Choristers of Wells Cathedral; 1933-1936 | Succeeded by Denys Pouncey |
| Preceded by John Dykes Bower | Organist and Master of the Choristers of Durham Cathedral; 1936-1974 | Succeeded by Richard Lloyd |
