= William Broderip (organist) =

English organist

William Broderip (1683–1726) was an English organist.

== Life ==
Broderip, whose parentage and education is not known, was appointed a vicar choral of Wells Cathedral on 1 April 1701. On 1 October 1706 he was appointed sub-treasurer, and on 1 April 1708 a cathedral stall was assigned to him. On 2 January 1712 he succeeded John George as organist of the cathedral, at an annual salary of £20. He retained this post until his death, which took place 31 January 1726. Broderip was buried in the nave of the cathedral.

== Works ==
The Tudway Collection contains an anthem, 'God is our hope and strength,’ with instrumental accompaniments, which was written by Broderip in 1713 to celebrate the peace of Utrecht, but this is almost his sole composition extant.

== Family ==
According to the inscription on his gravestone, he left a widow and nine children. Some of the latter probably followed their father's profession, as besides Robert and John Broderip there were two other organists of the name in the west of England towards the latter part of the eighteenth century: Edmund Broderip, who was organist of St. James's, Bristol, between 1742 and 1771, and another organist of the same name (whose Christian name is not known) who lived at Leominster about 1770.
