= Carling Black Label =

Canadian beer

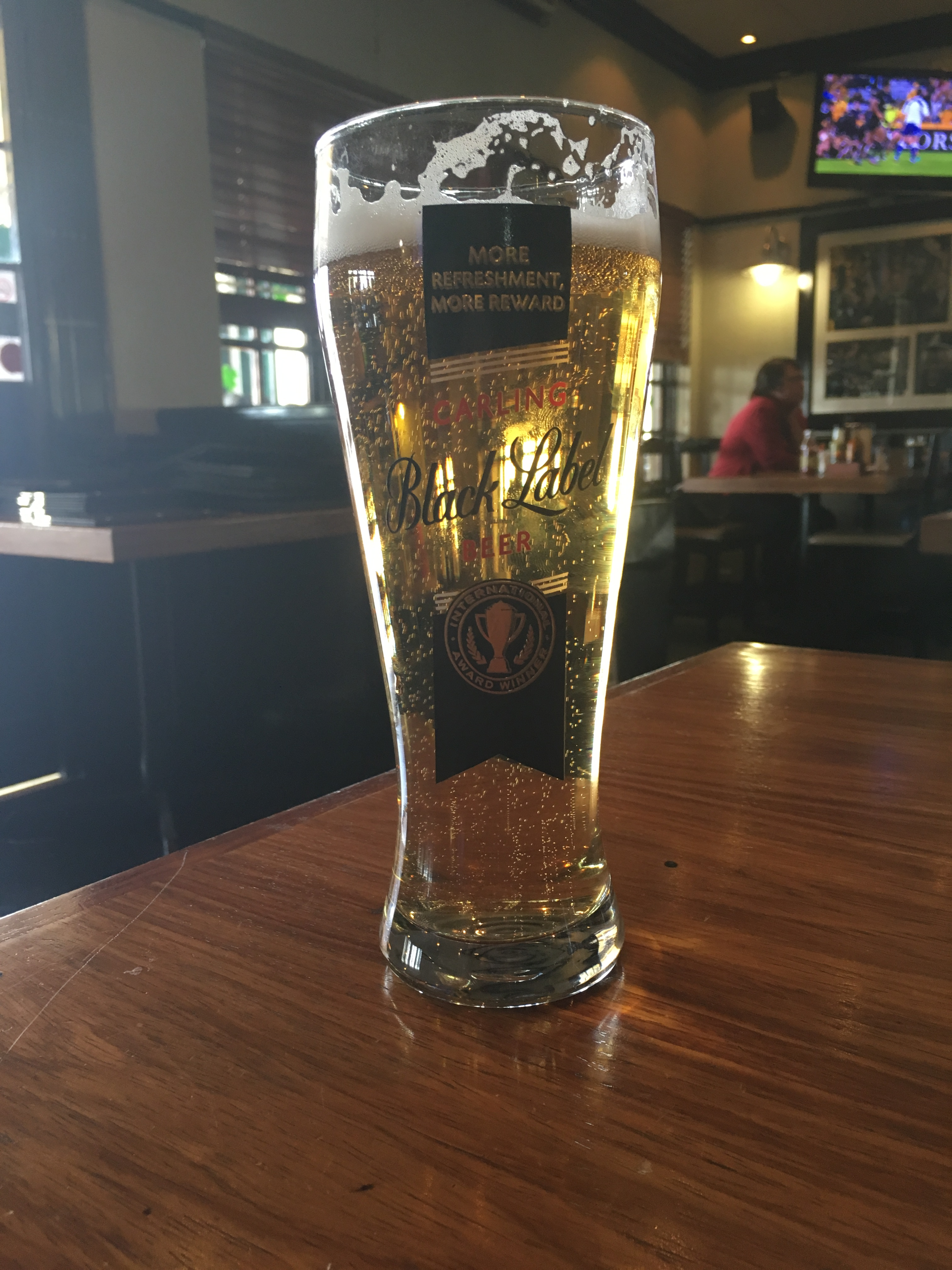
- A draught Black Label
- Type: Beer
- Manufacturer: Carling Brewing Company
- Distributor: Carling Brewing Company
- Origin: Canada
- Introduced: 1927
- Alcohol by volume: 4.7%–5.5%
- Website: https://www.carlingblacklabel.co.za/

Carling Black Label is a lager distributed by Carling Brewing Company.

== History ==
Although its original focus was on ale, Carling has brewed lager-style beers since the 1870s. In 1927, as part of a corporate re-branding under new president J. Innes Carling, the company renamed its Black & White Lager to Black Label.

Three years later, Carling was purchased by Toronto business tycoon E. P. Taylor, who merged it into his Canadian Breweries Limited (CBL), which grew to be the world's largest brewing company. Under Taylor, Black Label was promoted as CBL's flagship brand and went on to become the first beer to be brewed on a mass international scale, becoming particularly popular in Commonwealth countries such as the United Kingdom, Australia, New Zealand and South Africa.

=== Canada ===
In response to a shift in popular taste away from ale, Carling added a three-storey lager plant to their main London, Ontario, brewery in 1877. Carling's Lager (later renamed Carling's Bavarian Stock Lager, and then Carling's Imperial Club Lager) was the company's first lager. Carling's Black & White Lager was introduced in the 1920s and later renamed Black Label Lager, in contrast to their Red Cap Ale.

Around 1990, Black Label had an advertising campaign in Canada which used the phrase "The Legend is Black".

=== United States ===
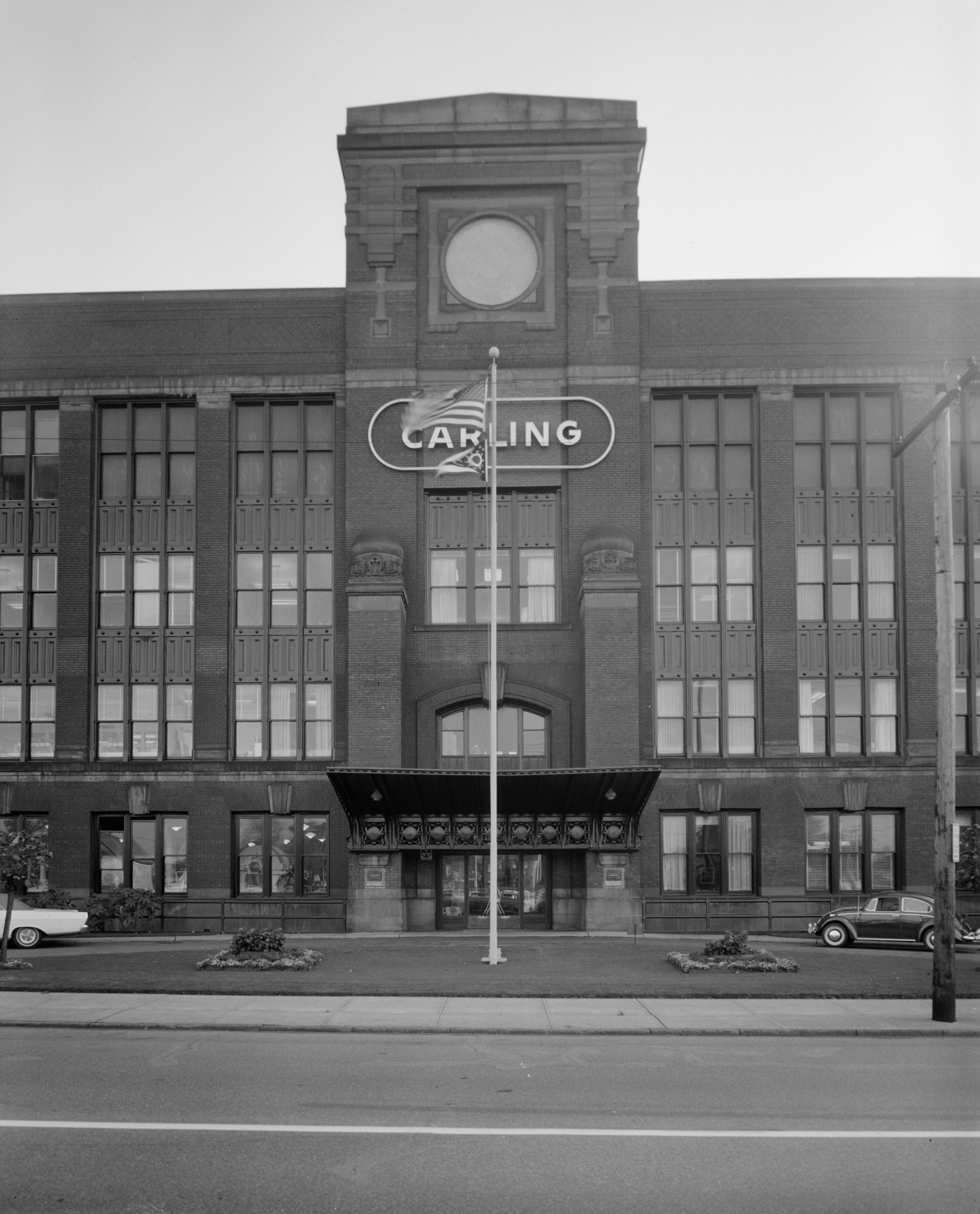
Brewing Corporation of America of Cleveland, Ohio in 1965. Home of Carling Black Label lager and Carling Red Cap Ale and former site the Peerless Motor Car Company

After the repeal of prohibition in 1933, the Peerless Motor Car Company, looking for a way to diversify in the car market of the Great Depression, purchased the American rights to Carling's formulas, identifying labels and trademarks. Technicians and brewmasters were sent from Canada to convert a Peerless plant in Cleveland, Ohio, into the Brewing Corporation of America. They first tried just brewing Carling's Red Cap Ale, but sales were too slow to maintain the brewery, and didn't climb until the introduction of Black Label lager. The philosophy behind Black Label was to have a high quality lager that was available nationwide, but with a locally brewed budget price. The strategy worked, and the next several decades led to rapid growth and expansion for the brewery and the Carling Black Label brand. Carling Black Label was available to GIs in Vietnam, but still in steel cans, which were sometimes rusted when the troops got it there, and served warm.

When Carling stopped producing Black Label to focus on a more profitable lager, they found their sales plummeting. Carling re-introduced Black Label with a beautiful blonde named Mabel, portrayed by Jeanne Goodspeed, with the slogan "Hey Mabel, Black Label!". The twenty-year marketing campaign cemented the name in the popular culture of America.

In 1979, after several years of intense pressure from Miller and Anheuser-Busch, Carling was bought out by the Heileman Brewing Co. of La Crosse, Wisconsin. Carling and the Black Label brand are currently owned by the Molson Coors Brewing Company. Though no longer widely distributed in the U.S., Black Label is still available in select markets (notably, metro Detroit), and remains the official beer of Beer Frisbee.

=== United Kingdom ===
Black Label was introduced to the United Kingdom in 1952. Originally only available in bottles, in 1965 the Hill Top in Sheffield became the first pub to pour Carling Black Label on draught.

A pint of Carling in a pub in Kettering, England

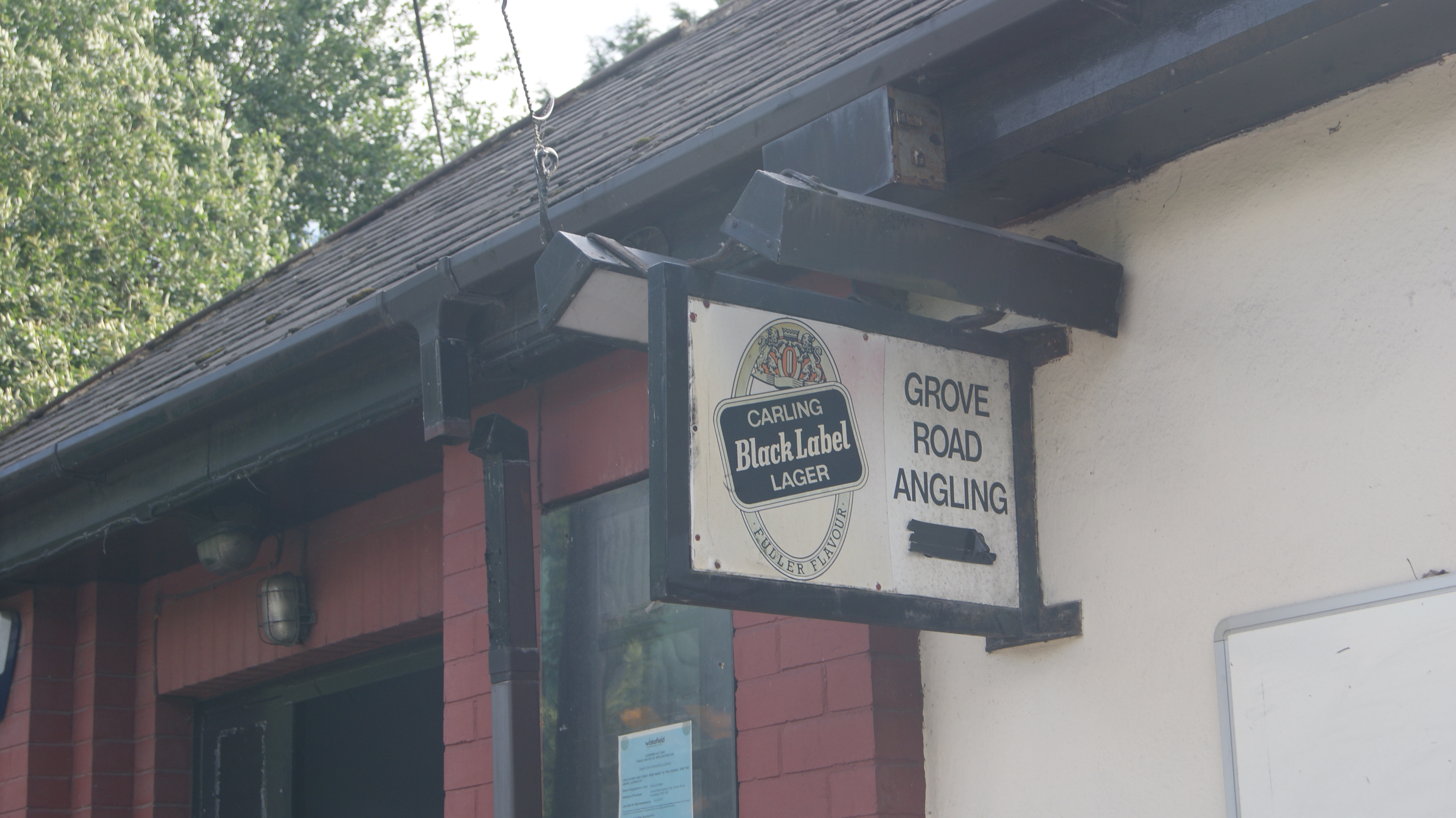
Carling Black Label sign on a club in Pontefract, West Yorkshire.

In the 1970s and 1980s, Carling Black Label sales were driven to great heights, due partly to increased advertising support, in particular the classic "I bet he drinks" series of advertisements, and partly with the launch of Carling Black Label in cans. Cans were important to Carling's success as they helped open up the "take home" market.

The "I bet he drinks" series of ads showed someone doing something cool, clever or difficult, and having a bystander say "I bet he drinks Carling Black Label". With the help of this advertising campaign, it became Britain's best-selling brand of beer in 1971. In the 1980s, many of the adverts featured comedians Mark Arden and Stephen Frost, also known as The Oblivion Boys, delivering the classic punchline. One of the advertisements in the series, Dambusters from 1989, was a parody of the 1955 film of the same name, and was ranked at number 12 on ITV's list of the "Best Ever Ads" in 2005, and at number 17 on Channel 4's list of the "100 Greatest TV Ads" in 2000. Campaign Live also ranked it at number 5 in their list of the "Top 10 Funniest TV Ads of All Time" in 2008.

Carling was Britain's best selling draught beer between 1985 and 2024. Black Label was dropped from the brand name and logo in Britain in 1997, but was reintroduced in February 2026 with a new premium look and recipe.

=== South Africa ===
In South Africa, Black Label began to take on a different tone with the anti-apartheid movement. This was partly due to the fact that, at 5.5%, it had more alcohol than the other brands of beer that generally had 5.0%, as noted in the popular advertising catch phrase "only hard working students deserve an extra 0.5 percent".

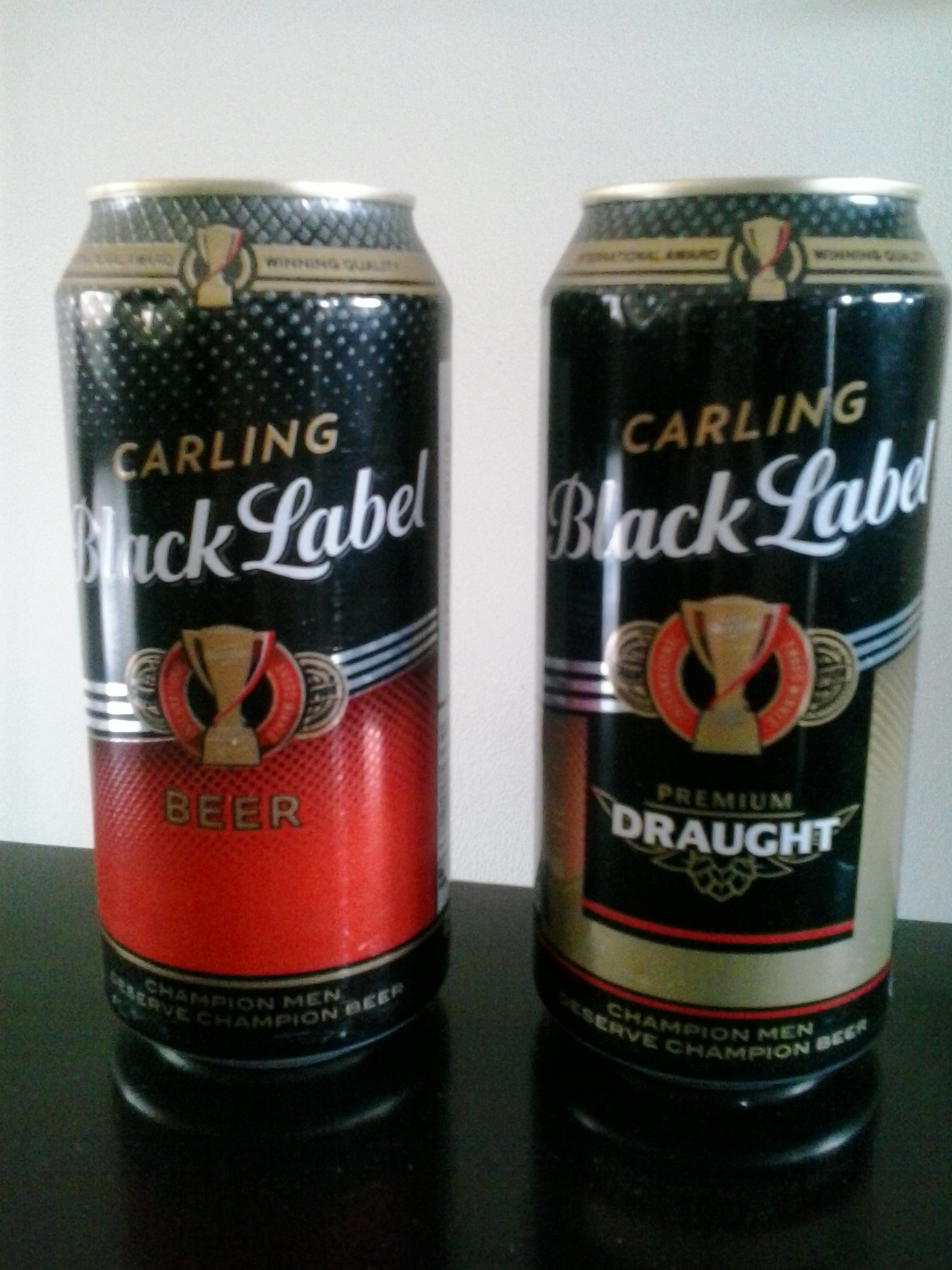
SABMiller variants of Black Label

Furthermore, the connotation of black to the racial issue became a point of pride to the native Africans. It used to be sold with the motto, "America's Lusty, Lively Beer", perhaps in reference to Canada, though it is seldom seen in the United States. The motto came from an older advertising campaign in the United States. Another famous Afrikaans slogan for Black Label in South Africa is "Black Label sê die bybel", which means "The Bible says (one should drink) Black Label".

The beer was parodied by South African T-shirt company Laughitoff. The slogan was changed to "Black Labour, White Guilt", which led to an unsuccessful trademark infringement lawsuit from SABMiller.

The brand has the local nickname "Zamalek", after the Egyptian soccer team Zamalek SC beat Kaizer Chiefs in the 1990s.
