= Denys Pouncey =

English cathedral organist

Denys Pouncey (1906–1999) was an English cathedral organist, who served in Wells Cathedral.

== Background ==
Denys Duncan Rivers Pouncey was born on 23 December 1906 and was educated at Marlborough College and Queens' College, Cambridge.

In 1935 he founded the Northampton Bach Choir.

From April 1943 to April 1946 he served in the Royal Air Force and his duties at Wells Cathedral were filled by Revd. H.G. Bawtree-Williams, an amateur organist from Hampshire.

== Career ==
Assistant organist of:

- St. John's College, Cambridge 1928–1934

Organist of:

- St Matthew's Church, Northampton 1934–1936
- Wells Cathedral 1936–1970

Cultural offices
Preceded by Conrad William Eden	Organist and Master of the Choristers of Wells Cathedral; 1936-1970	Succeeded by Anthony Crossland
