= Tom Davis (journalist) =

American journalist and academic

- Born: 1967 (age 58–59)
- Education: M.S. in New Media Journalism
- Occupation: Journalist
- Notable credit: Coping
- Website: http://www.tom-davis.net/

Tom Davis (born 1967) is an American journalist and academic on mental health issues.

== Career ==
=== Journalism ===
One of Davis' first jobs was as a reporter and columnist at The Princeton Packet when he was employed by the magazine in 1989, in 1990 he moved on to The Delaware State News where he worked for 3 years. He wrote for The Ocean County Observer before becoming a reporter at The Press of Atlantic City in 1993, a position he maintained for 5 years.

In 1998 Davis moved on to The Morning Call before leaving there in 2001 to work for The Record where he wrote Coping one of the nation’s only mental health newspaper columns that was published in The Record of Bergen County, New Jersey, from 2003 to 2008.

He has written about mental health issues for The Huffington Post.

In September 2010, Davis became Jersey Shore regional editor at AOL's Patch.com and later managed Patch.com's operations in New Jersey. In 2023, Davis was named editor of Best's Review.

His first book, A Legacy of Madness: Recovering My Family from Generations of Mental Illness, was released by Hazelden Publishing on Oct. 3, 2011.

=== Teaching ===
Davis teaches journalism classes at Rutgers University, and a course on mental health issues in the media at Fairleigh Dickinson University in New Jersey. He also teaches a class called Writing For Media as well as Media Ethics at Rutgers.

== Awards and honours ==
In 1990, Davis was awarded the NJPA's Robert P. Kelly award, which is the state's rookie-of-the-year prize for young journalists.

In 2003, he won a first-place award in the New Jersey Press Association's annual Better Newspaper Contest. It was his fourth such honor. He was one of six people in the nation to win the Rosalynn Carter Mental Health Journalism Fellowship in 2004.

Tom Davis was named "Citizen of the Year" by the New Jersey Psychiatric Association in 2007. He also received an ambassador award from the New Jersey Governor’s Council on Stigma in 2008.
