= Robert Broderip =

English organist and composer

Robert Broderip (died 1808) was an English organist and composer.

== Life ==
Broderip lived at Bristol during the latter part of the eighteenth century. He was a relation of John Broderip, organist of Wells Cathedral, probably either a brother or son, and also of Francis Broderip (d. 1807) who was a bookseller and publisher at 13 Haymarket, and who was one of the founders of the firm of Longman & Broderip, pianoforte makers and music publishers. Next to nothing is known of Broderip's biography. He lived at Bristol all his life, and wrote a considerable quantity of music. He died in Church Lane, Bristol, on 14 May 1808. His eldest son, a lieutenant on HMS Achates, died of yellow fever in the West Indies in 1811, aged 19.

== Works ==
His most important compositions are an occasional ode on the king's recovery, a concerto for pianoforte (or harpsichord) and strings, eight voluntaries for the organ, a volume of instructions for the pianoforte or harpsichord, a collection of psalms (partly by John Broderip), collections of duets, glees, &c., and many songs.
