= Thomas Jefferson Davis =

United States Army general

Thomas Jefferson Davis (October 19, 1893 – 1964) was born in West Union, South Carolina and worked as a farmer until his enlistment in the 5th Regiment, National Guard of Georgia on July 27, 1916. He served in France in 1918 and with the American Army of Occupation in Germany until 1923. For ten years he was aide-de-camp to General Douglas MacArthur, military commander in the Philippines. He advanced through the grades to Brigadier General in 1942. From 1942 to 1944 he was Adjutant General, Allied Forces Headquarters, North African Theater of Operations. In 1944 he became Adjutant General, SHAEF.
