= Don Brewery =

Brewery in Toronto, Ontario, Canada

Coordinates: 43.6578°N 79.3569°W

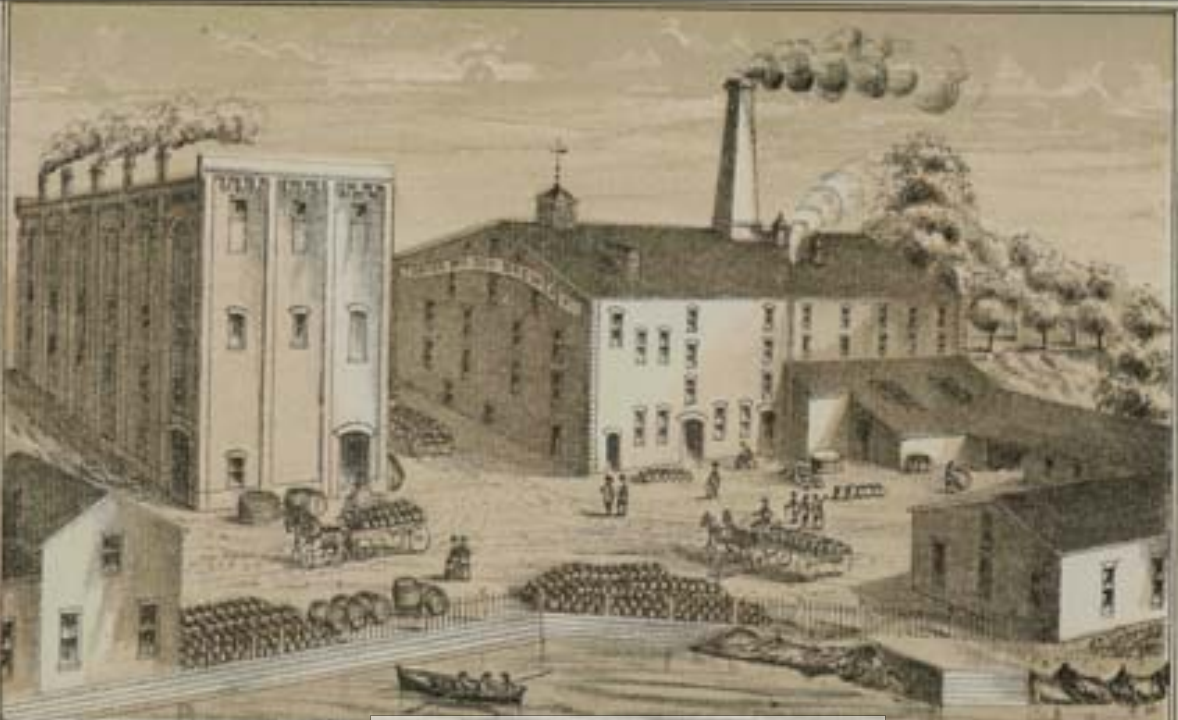
The Don Brewery in 1877.

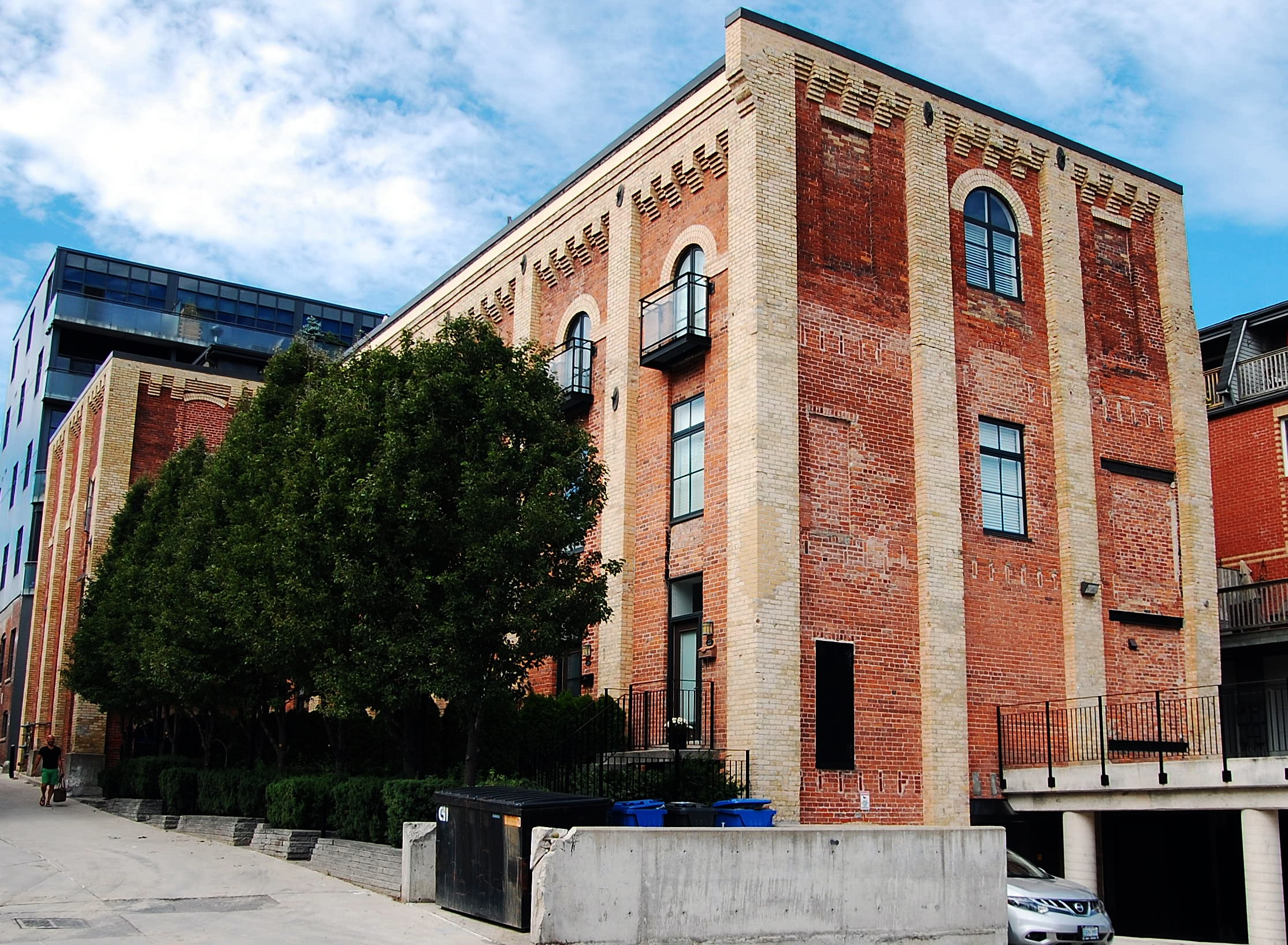
The Malthouse Building, all that remains of the former Don Brewery, in September 2013.

The Don Brewery (originally the Don Bridge Brewery, and later the Davies Brewery) was a brewery in Toronto, Ontario, Canada. It was one of the largest breweries in 19th century Toronto. It was located along the Don River in the Corktown neighbourhood of Toronto.

== History ==
The brewery was founded in 1844 by William and Robert Parks as the Don Bridge Brewery. Thomas Davies, who had been running his own brewery, the Yonge Street Brewery, bought the brewery from the Parks in 1848.

In 1868, Davies enlisted his son Thomas Jr. to manage the brewery, its name changed to Thomas Davies and Son. Thomas Sr. died not much later, leaving Thomas Jr. in charge. Thomas enlisted his brother Joseph and later his brother Robert in 1872 and renaming the company Davies and Brothers. They expanded the brewery extensively, building a new plant to make lager in 1877. This made the brewery an early adopter of lager brewing in Toronto, ahead of O'Keefe and Cosgrave by several years. In 1879, Robert opened his own brewery, the Dominion Brewery, a few blocks west on Queen Street.

In 1873, Thomas Jr. won election to City of Toronto alderman. He was one of the proponents of the City accepting John Howard's High Park. He also led the movement to create Riverdale Park, have the City take over the Furness Water Works and to straighten the Don River next to the brewery, which made room for a rail line next to the brewery.

The brewery was sold to the London & Colonial Financial Company in 1889 for CA$1.2 million, a massive amount at that time. In 1902, the English investors were interested in selling the brewery and it was sold to John Dick in 1903. The brewery was unionized in 1903, the first to unionize in Toronto. The brewery was destroyed by fire, attributed to spontaneous combustion, in 1907 and the brewery shut down completely in 1910. Only the southern lager brewery building survived the fire.

Thomas Davies Jr. ran for Toronto Mayor in 1913, but lost. He died in 1916, a few months after his brother Robert.

== Today ==
The site is occupied by residential buildings. Only the brewery's lager brewery, survives to the present day. It was converted to condominium apartments known as the Malthouse Building. It was designated a heritage structure in 1996.
