= John Broderip =

English organist

John Broderip (1719–1770) was an English organist.

== Life ==
Broderip was a son of William Broderip, organist of Wells Cathedral, who died in 1726. In 1740, he was organist at Minehead. The first mention of him in the chapter records of Wells is on 2 December 1740, when he was admitted a vicar choral of the cathedral for a year on probation. On 1 April 1741, it was ordered by the dean and chapter that Broderip, who had supplied the place of organist from the death of Mr. Evans, should be paid the usual salary allowed on that account in proportion to the time, and he was admitted into the place of organist of the cathedral. On 30 September of the same year, Broderip was fully appointed organist at a salary of £20, and master of the choristers at £7 a year; on 3 December following, he was perpetuated as a vicar choral, and on 20 November 1769, was appointed sub-treasurer, on the death of Thomas Parfitt. In the latter years of his life, Broderip was organist of Shepton Mallet, Somerset.

== Works ==
Between 1766 and 1771, Broderip published a collection of Psalms, Hymns, and Spiritual Songs, dedicated to the Dean of Wells, Lord Francis Seymour. After his death, some more settings of the Psalms by him were incorporated in a publication by Robert Broderip of Bristol.
