= Thomas Francis Davis =

United States Army general

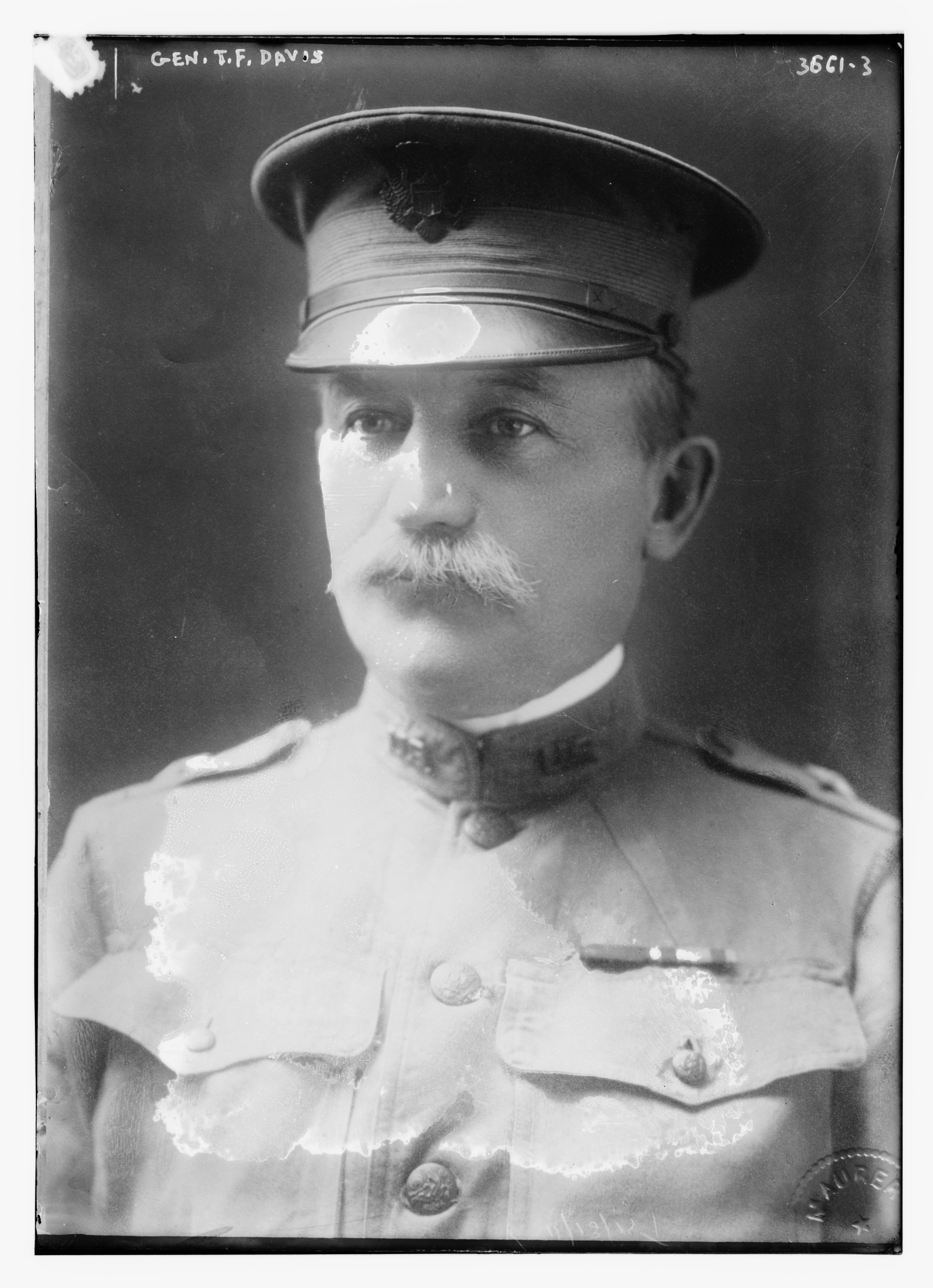
- George Grantham Bain Collection, Library of Congress
- Born: March 8, 1853; New York City
- Died: December 10, 1935 (aged 82); El Paso, Texas
- Burial place: Evergreen Cemetery, El Paso, Texas
- Spouse: Paulina S. Hart (m. 1886)
- Children: 3
- Military career
- Allegiance: United States
- Branch: United States Army
- Service years: 1875–1917
- Rank: Brigadier General
- Service number: 0-13111
- Unit: U.S. Army Infantry Branch
- Commands: 18th Infantry Regiment; 5th Infantry Brigade; 6th Infantry Brigade; Arizona District
- Wars: American Indian Wars; Spanish–American War; World War I

Thomas Francis Davis (March 8, 1853 – December 10, 1935) was a United States Army officer in the late 19th and early 20th centuries. He was among the three oldest World War I generals, all of whom were born in the same year.

== Biography ==
Davis was born in New York City on March 8, 1853, the son of James and Mary Davis. He graduated from the United States Military Academy in 1875 and was commissioned in the 15th Infantry Regiment.

In the 15th Infantry, Davis served in the American Indian Wars, went on the expedition against the Ute people in 1879, and went into Mexico after the Apaches. He served on the American frontier until 1890. During the Spanish–American War in Cuba, Davis commanded a battalion in the 15th Infantry, and he served in Santiago de Cuba as the collector of customs in 1899. Taking three tours of duty to the Philippines, he commanded the 18th Infantry Regiment against the Moro Rebellion during his last tour. He also served as the governor of the Lanao district. Davis also held several roles in the U.S., including overseeing general recruiting in the Saint Louis, Missouri area and serving as a military secretary at the Department of the Colorado headquarters.

Promoted to the rank of brigadier general on May 16, 1913, Davis assumed command of the 5th Infantry Brigade at Galveston, Texas, and in February 1914 he was given command of the 6th Infantry Brigade in Texas City, Texas. Davis served in several other locations, including commanding the Arizona district between May 1916 and May 1917.

Retiring from military service in May 1917, Davis lived in El Paso right along the Rio Grande. He died there on December 10, 1935.

== Bibliography ==
- Davis, Henry Blaine Jr. (1998). Generals in Khaki. Raleigh, North Carolina: Pentland Press. ISBN 1571970886. OCLC 40298151.
- Marquis Who's Who (1975). Who Was Who In American History – The Military. Chicago, Illinois: Marquis Who's Who. ISBN 0837932017.
