= Thomas Henry Davis (organist) =

English cathedral organist (1867–1947)

Reverend Canon Thomas Henry Davis (1867 – 1947) was an English cathedral organist, who served in Wells Cathedral and was the only person ever to hold a simultaneous post of canon of a cathedral and organist of the old foundation cathedrals.

== Background ==
Thomas Henry Davis was born on 25 September 1867 in Birmingham and educated at King Edward's School, Birmingham.

In 1892, he became curate at the Collegiate Church of St Mary, Warwick, moving to Wells Cathedral in 1895 as priest vicar. In 1912, he was appointed a prebendary of the cathedral and became precentor and canon residentiary in 1920. He remained in this post until his death in Wells in October 1947.

== Career ==
Organist of:

- St Matthew's Church, Birmingham
- Wells Cathedral 1899 - 1933

Cultural offices
Preceded by Percy Carter Buck	Organist and Master of the Choristers of Wells Cathedral; 1899-1933	Succeeded by Conrad William Eden
