= Koffler Centre of the Arts =

Koffler Arts

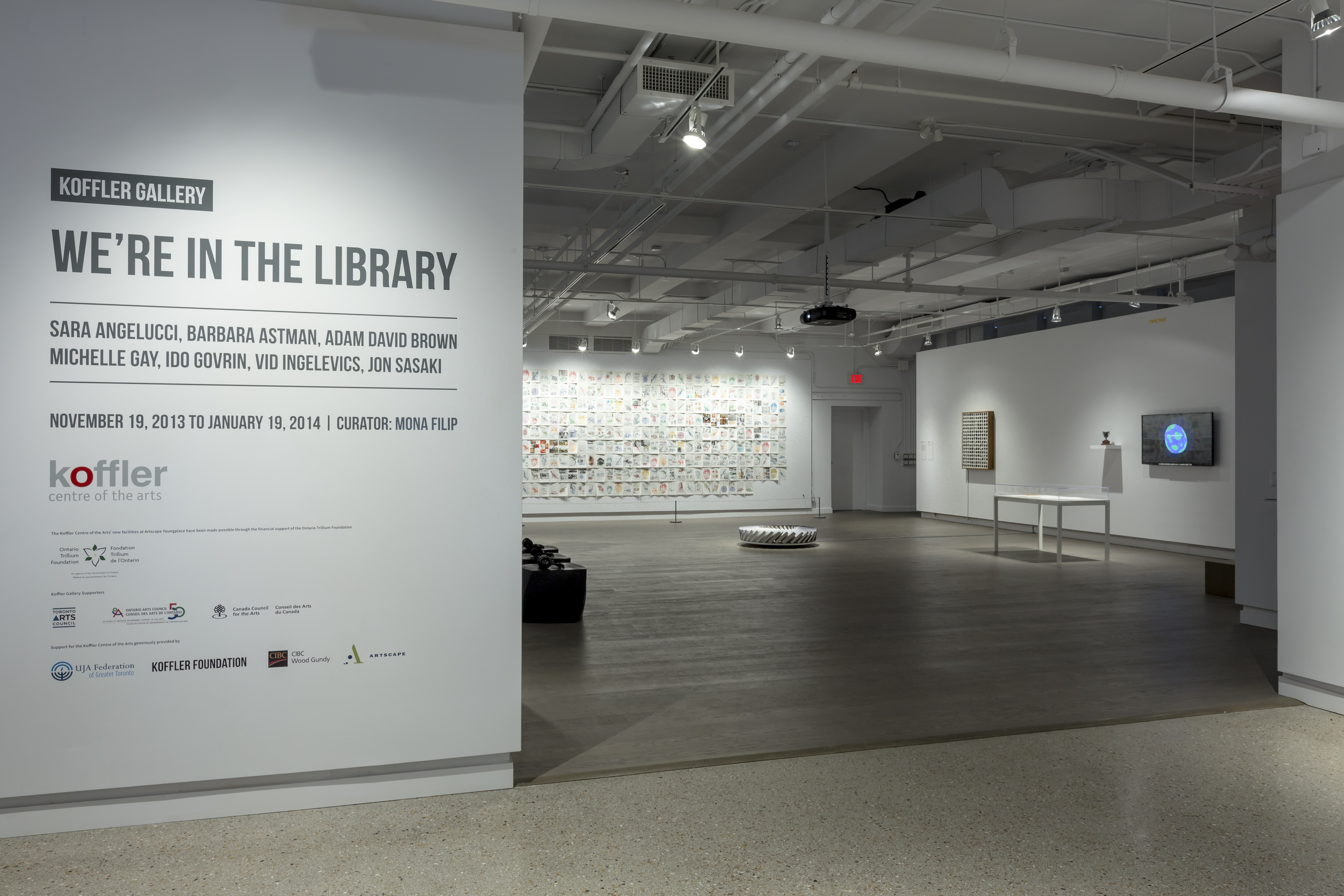
- Entrance to the gallery, 2013
- Interactive fullscreen map
- Established: 1977; 49 years ago
- Location: Artscape Youngplace,180 Shaw Street; Toronto, Ontario; M6J 2W5
- Coordinates: 43°38′49″N 79°25′03″W
- Type: Art gallery
- Director: Matthew Jocelyn
- Website: kofflerarts.org

Koffler Arts is an art gallery and broad-based cultural institution focusing on Jewish artistic voices established in 1977 by Murray and Marvelle Koffler and based at Artscape Youngplace in the West Queen West area of downtown Toronto, Ontario.

== History ==
Koffler Arts was established in 1977 as part of the Bathurst Jewish Community Centre (BJCC) in the North York area of Toronto on Bathurst Street. On July 1, 2009, the Koffler was incorporated as an independent not-for-profit charitable organization.

The Koffler was home to the Jewish Book Fair (1977-2011), the Toronto Jewish Literary Festival (2012-2014) and the Koffler Chamber Orchestra (2005-2014).

In 2008, Koffler Arts was rebranded and restructured, with a multidisciplinary program department that ran complementary to the Koffler Gallery. Unlike the Gallery, with its mandate to exhibit, interpret, and document works in the visual arts, focusing on contemporary Canadian art and programming of interest to the Jewish community, the multidisciplinary programs focused more specifically on Jewish arts and culture from Canada and internationally.

The Koffler Gallery moved its programming off-site in 2009 when the original Koffler Gallery was demolished along with the BJCC. Koffler multidisciplinary programs were also programmed off-site around the GTA, with events located downtown, mid-town and the north GTA (Vaughan/Thornhill).

In 2013, after five years programming off-site, Koffler Arts opened its administrative offices and a new Koffler Gallery at Artscape Youngplace in downtown Toronto. The Artscape Youngplace facilities showcase Koffler Gallery exhibitions, public programs, expanded school and education programs, as well as programs in partnership with Artscape Youngplace tenants and other neighbourhood organizations. Koffler multidisciplinary programs (concerts, literary events, artist residencies, theatre programs, lectures/talks and more) now take place at Artscape Youngplace, as well as various locations across the GTA. Starting in summer 2014, the Koffler no longer offers studio classes in visual art and ceramics at the Prosserman JCC on Sherman Campus (at Bathurst and Sheppard). Classes at that location are now offered under the management of the Prosserman JCC.

== Leadership and Funding ==
From 2001 to 2014, Tiana Koffler Boyman was the Board Chair. From 2006 to 2013, Lori Starr, former Senior Vice President and Museum Director, Skirball Cultural Center (2001–2006) and former Director of Public Affairs and Communications, the J. Paul Getty Museum and J. Paul Getty Trust, Los Angeles (1986–2001), was the Executive Director. In February 2013, Starr left the Koffler for the position of Executive Director of the Contemporary Jewish Museum in San Francisco. From 2014 to 2019, Cathy Jonasson was the Koffler Arts' Executive Director. Karen Tisch was Executive Director from 2019 to 2021.

Koffler Arts is supported and funded by the Koffler Family Foundation as well as its patrons, members, donors and corporate sponsors. The Centre receives annual support from the Ontario Arts Council through the Community and Multidisciplinary Arts Organizations Program, and received funding in 2013 for renovations to its new space at Artscape Youngplace through the Ontario Trillium Foundation. CIBC Wood Gundy is the Koffler's Cultural Season Sponsor (2009–present). The Centre receives financial support from the UJA Federation of Greater Toronto, and is included on the list of the UJA Federation's Partner Agencies, Programs & Departments.

The Koffler Gallery is a public gallery supported by the City of Toronto through the Toronto Arts Council, the Ontario Arts Council and the Canada Council for the Arts.

Fundraising to support the Koffler's diverse programs is achieved through several charitable events, philanthropic donations to its exhibitions and programs, and galas. Two fundraisers in 2009, ARTFUL DISH and The Wrecking Ball, were catalysts to support expansion of programs and reach new audience members and patrons. In 2010, the ballet gala 'Stars of the 21st Century' was the Koffler's major fundraiser.

In 2012, the Koffler partnered with Luminato, Toronto's Festival of Arts and Creativity, to present the opening night of Batsheva Dance Company's North American premiere performance of 'Sadeh21'. Funds raised from the evening supported Koffler Arts and its programs. The evening included a pre-performance dinner at a private residence for Koffler patrons, the contemporary dance performance of 'Sadeh21' at the MacMillan Theatre, University of Toronto, and a post-event celebration at the Gardiner Museum. The evening also honoured Senator Linda Frum and Howard Sokolowski for their philanthropic support of the arts. In 2013, the Koffler's major fundraiser was Koffler Rocks! - a benefit evening featuring music performances by Randy Bachman, The Sadies, and Melanie Fiona. The event took place at Artscape Wychwood Barns on May 2, 2013. On May 15, 2014, the Koffler revived its ARTFUL DISH fundraiser, featuring intimate dinners in private homes with cultural luminaries and well-known chefs. Luminaries included Ian Brown, Johanna Schneller, Adad Hannah, Barbara Astman, Deepa Mehta, Anne Michaels, Bernice Eisenstein, Colin Mochrie, Debra McGrath, Louise Pitre, Veronica Tennant. In 2015, the Koffler's major fundraiser was Art Privé: 3 Nights in June, three intimate evenings in exclusive private settings featuring modern and contemporary art collections.

== Activities and Facilities ==
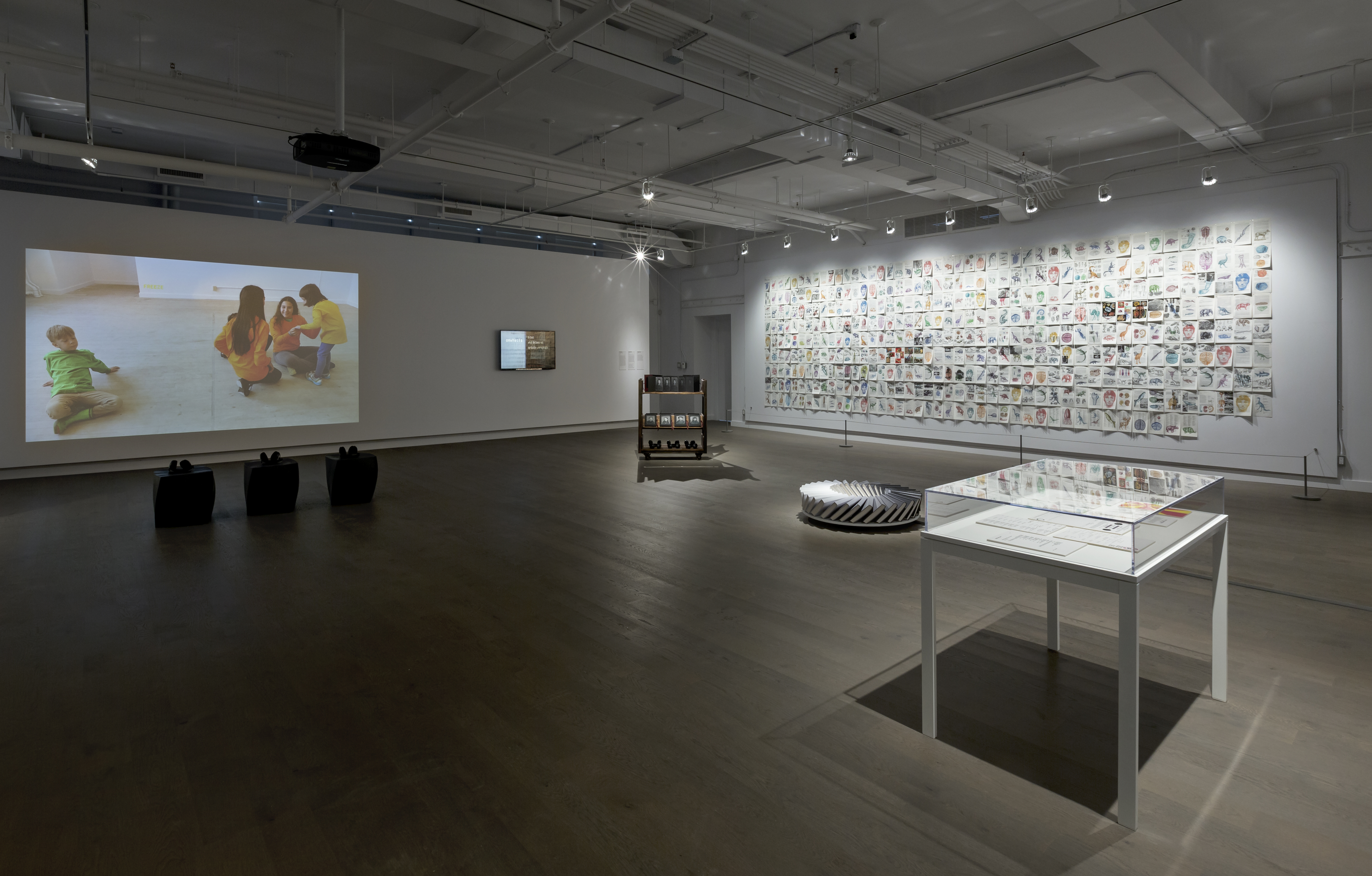
The Koffler Gallery's inaugural exhibition 'We're in the Library' at Artscape Youngplace, November 2013

The Koffler presents exhibitions of contemporary Canadian and international art with the Koffler Gallery, and is home to the Vine Awards for Canadian Jewish Literature (formerly known as the Canadian Jewish Book Awards). It presents year-round literary events, concerts, education programs, film screenings, theatre programs, and discussions on contemporary art and culture. Rooted in the Jewish community of Toronto, the Koffler specializes in an interdisciplinary mix of programs to bring artists and the community together. In 2009, Koffler Arts was incorporated for charitable status in Canada.

=== Koffler Gallery ===
The Koffler Gallery was established in 1980 and initially developed a successful range of exhibitions on contemporary crafts. It shifted its mandate in 1994 to focus on contemporary Canadian art. From 1980 to 2009, the Gallery was located in its own dedicated space at the Bathurst Jewish Community Centre. In 2009, the Gallery moved its programming off-site when the Bathurst Jewish Community Centre was demolished. From 2009 to 2013, the Gallery exhibited its exhibitions and site-specific installations in various locations across the Greater Toronto area, including Honest Ed's, an abandoned house, the Jack Layton Ferry Docks, city sidewalks, parking lots, construction hoarding, and other rented or borrowed spaces. In November 2013, the Gallery opened its new downtown space at Artscape Youngplace.

=== Koffler Arts at Artscape Youngplace ===
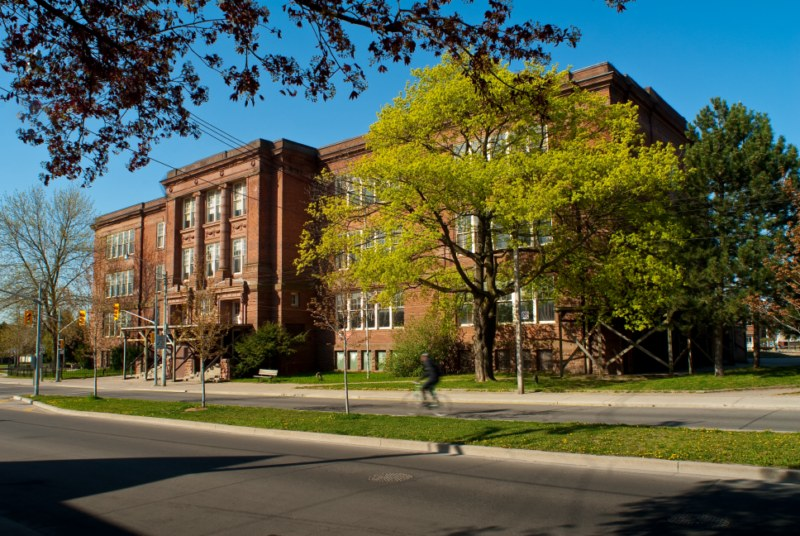
Artscape Youngplace

In November 2011, Koffler Arts announced that it was joining the Artscape Youngplace project in Toronto's downtown art and design district. The organization signed a five-year lease with Artscape to occupy a prominent space on the main floor of the new arts and cultural centre located at 180 Shaw Street, just north of Queen Street West, in the historic Shaw Street Public School (b. 1914, closed 2000).

Artscape Youngplace is a 75,000 sq. ft. centre for creative collaboration in a variety of disciplines, as well as arts, community and social mission organizations. Other owners and tenants include Luminato Festival, Centre for Indigenous Theatre, Inter-Galactic Arts Co-op, College-Montrose Children's Place, Paperhouse Studio, Red Pepper Spectacle Arts, SKETCH, Small World Music Society, Typology Projects, The Developing Tank, and artists Barbara Astman, Eve Egoyan, Heather Nichol, Shabnam K. Ghazi, and Vid Ingelevics.

Starting in fall 2013, Koffler Gallery exhibitions, related education and public programs, as well as Koffler Arts' multidisciplinary programs will be based at Artscape Youngplace.

Artscape Youngplace opened in November 2013. The Koffler Arts administrative offices and the Koffler Gallery are located in a 4,600 sq. ft. space on the main floor of the building.

== Programs ==
=== 2018-2019 ===
The 2018-19 season featured Books & Ideas, a series of author talks and on-stage interviews, with Indigenous authors Joshua Whitehead and Arielle Twist; Indian writer and journalist Amitava Kumar and Shani Mootoo; and The New York Times critic-at-large Wesley Morris and CBC's Amanda Parris. The 2018 Vine Awards for Canadian Jewish Literature were announced and presented at a ceremony at the Windsor Arms Hotel.

The Koffler Gallery season featured the group exhibition 'Through lines' guest curated by Noah Bronstein and featuring artists Lise Beaudry, Scott Benesiinaabandan, Michèle Pearson Clarke, Leila Fatemi, Maria Hupfield, Raafia Jessa, and Nadia Myre (September 13 – November 25, 2018). 'Never Never Land' was the first solo exhibition in Canada for Tehran-born Iranian-Canadian artist Ghazaleh Avarzamani (January 17 – March 17, 2019). Israeli-artist Nevet Yitzhak's 'WarCraft' was a Primary Exhibition of the 2019 CONTACT Photography Festival presented in partnership with Images Festival (April 4 – May 26, 2019). 'Peter's Proscenium' was London-based painter Christian Hidaka and Paris-based sculptor Raphaël Zarka's first exhibition in Canada (June 20 – August 18, 2019).

=== 2017-2018 ===
The 2017-18 season included literary events and conversations featuring authors Nicole Krauss, Nathan Englander, Eric Beck Rubin, Danila Botha, Gwen Benaway, Katherena Vermette, 2017 Man Booker International Prize winning author David Grossman in conversation with Michael Enright (broadcaster), and American author and public speaker Fran Lebowitz. The second annual Vine Awards for Canadian Jewish Literature were announced and presented at a ceremony at the Park Hyatt Toronto.

The 2017-18 Koffler Gallery season featured 'Staring Back at the Sun: Video Art from Israel, 1970-2012', an international, touring exhibition featuring 38 artists and curated by Ilana Tenenbaum, Sergio Edelsztein, Yael Bartana and Avi Feldman (September 14 to November 26, 2017). 'Nicole Collins: Furthest Boundless' was a major, new mixed media installation by Toronto artist Nicole Collins (January 18 to March 18, 2018). 'Esther Shalev-Gerz' was Paris-based artist Esther Shalev-Gerz' first solo exhibition in Toronto, a Primary Exhibition of the 2018 CONTACT Photography Festival (April 5 to June 3, 2018). 'José Luis Torres: Question d'adaptation' is a site-specific, multi-roomed, maze-like sculptural installation created by Argentinian-born, Québec-based artist José Luis Torres (June 21 to August 26, 2018).

=== 2016-2017 ===
The inaugural Vine Awards for Canadian Jewish Literature were announced and presented at a ceremony at the Four Seasons Hotel and Residences Toronto in September 2016. In October 2016, Koffler Arts – together with Why Not Theatre and Complicite Creative Learning – co-presented the Toronto premiere of the theatre/performance project 'Like Mother, Like Daughter', featuring pairs of immigrant and newcomer mothers and daughters on stage in unscripted conversations. In May 2017, the Koffler presented the Toronto premiere of Joshua Harmon's internationally produced play, 'Bad Jews'. Other programs included author Olive Senior in conversation with Toronto playwright Ravi Jain at the International Festival of Authors; 'YidLife does Kensington', a web series by Yidlife Crisis creators Eli Battalion and Jamie Elman, focusing on the Jewish history Toronto's eclectic Kensington Market neighbourhood; Israeli author Etgar Keret at the Toronto Public Library; and Koffler Salon, a series of cross-disciplinary conversations that included evenings on the 2017 Women's March on Washington, identity and dislocation, and artists as disruptors.

The Koffler Gallery season included the large group exhibition 'Yonder' featuring twenty Canadian artists from diverse cultural backgrounds whose works examine the immigrant condition (September 21 to November 27, 2016). 'No Work, Nor Device, Nor Knowledge, Nor Wisdom' was Montreal painter Leopold Plotek's first survey exhibition (January 19 to March 19, 2017). 'His and Other Stories' was a survey of Montreal-based artist/performer 2Fik's work, and was a Primary Exhibition of the 2017 CONTACT Photography Festival (April 6 to June 4, 2017). Mary Anne Barkhouse: 'Le rêve aux loups' is the first Toronto solo exhibition for the Vancouver-born artist and sculptor (June 22 – August 20, 2017).

=== 2015-2016 ===
In 2015-16, Koffler Arts presented Pulitzer Prize-winning playwright and Academy Award-nominated screenwriter Tony Kushner in Conversation, Israeli author Assaf Gavron at the International Festival of Authors, live readings of Sheila McCarthy's new play 'Hairbrained', the Toronto premiere of season two of the web series YidLife Crisis with Jamie Elman and Eli Batalion, among many other literary, theatre, and public programs.

In February 2016, after a one-year hiatus, the Koffler announced the Vine Awards for Canadian Jewish Literature (formerly known as the Canadian Jewish Book Awards). The new awards have five categories, each with a $10,000 prize. Fiction, Non-Fiction, History and Young Adult/Children's Literature will be awarded annually; Poetry will be awarded every three years.

The Koffler launched Koffler.Digital in October 2015, "a digital arts series available 24/7 on a number of platforms, on your smartphone, tablet, or desktop, that uses the vigorous application of art, thought, and imagination on digital medias to explore the ideas that are shaping Toronto." Programs included 'The Slow Now', a public audio walk through Little Italy, Toronto that uses Toronto poet laureate Anne Michaels' iconic, award-winning novel 'Fugitive Pieces' as its foundation; 'Koffler X Neighbourhood's, which pairs young photographers with professional local writers to examine diverse Toronto neighbourhoods; and 'How to Build a Fire', an original radio play by Kat Sandler and produced by Theatre Brouhaha.

The Koffler Gallery 2015-16 season featured the first solo exhibition in Canada of British-Spanish filmmaker Isabel Rocamora. 'Troubled Histories, Ecstatic Solitudes' (September 17 to November 29, 2015) featured four film works – including the world exhibition premiere of 'Faith' – in which Rocamora explores "demographics of identity, then deconstructs the props and processes that hold, and often hurt, them." 'A Brief History', a solo exhibition of Toronto artist Howard Podeswa's latest series of paintings (January 27 to March 27, 2016) was hailed by Toronto Star art critic Murray Whyte as "Podeswa's magnum opus and well worth your time." Spring exhibition Raymond Boisjoly: 'Over a distance between one and many' (April 14 to June 12, 2016), guest curated by Sarah Robayo Sheridan, is a Primary Exhibition of the 2016 Scotiabank CONTACT Photography Festival.

=== 2014-2015 ===
The 2014-15 season included a series of literary events, including the book launch of 'The Jewish Comix Anthology: Volume 1' (published by Alternate History Comics Inc); Koffler @ IFOA (at Harbourfront Centre's International Festival of Authors) with Shelly Oria (author of 'New York 1, Tel Aviv 0') and Alison Pick (author of 'Far to Go', 'Between Gods'); an afternoon with author/radio producer Jonathan Goldstein (author of 'Lenny Bruce Is Dead' and 'Ladies and Gentlemen, The Bible!', host of CBC Radio's WireTap and regular contributor to This American Life); and the illustrated talk 'What the %@&*! Happened to Comics?' by Pulitzer Prize-winning artist/illustrator, comic book legend Art Spiegelman.

The Koffler co-presented a number of theatre/stage programs, including a staged reading of 'Infinity' by Hannah Moscovitch (presented together with Volcano Theatre), the North American premiere of 'Marathon' (co-presented by the Koffler Arts as part of Progress Festival, produced by the SummerWorks Performance Festival in partnership with The Theatre Centre), and the North American premiere of Theatre Ad Infinitum's 'Ballad of the Burning Star' (presented together with Acting Up Stage Company and Why Not Theatre).

The Koffler Gallery 2014-15 season featured the group exhibition 'PARDES' (September 13 to November 30, 2014), with new works by sound and multi-media artists Nadav Assor, Ira Eduardovna, Amnon Wolman, Nevet Yitzhak (guest curated by Liora Belford); Kristiina Lahde: 'ULTRA-PARALLEL' (January 22 to March 29, 2015); 'Erratics' (April 16 to June 14, 2015) featuring installations by Toronto author Martha Baillie and artist/curator Malka Greene with Alan Resnick; and 'Architecture Parallax: Through the Looking Glass' (July 2 to August 30, 2015), an architectural installation by Montreal-based Brazilian-Canadian artist Alexander Pilis.

The Koffler announced in December 2014 that the Canadian Jewish Book Awards were being "put on hiatus for 2015 and will resume, invigorated and reinvented, in 2016" as the Koffler recalibrates and revamps several of its current programs.

=== 2013-2014 ===
The 2013-14 season of multidisciplinary programs opened with Koffler @ Uma Nota Community Cultural Fair, featuring the Canadian debut of Brazilian master acoustic guitarist Rick Udler and Toronto four piece band, Tio Chorinho at Lula Lounge on October 20, 2013. For the third consecutive year, the Koffler returned to Harbourfront Centre's International Festival of Authors with Koffler @ IFOA on October 27, 2013 featuring Israeli first-time novelist Shani Boianjiu. In partnership with the Miles Nadal JCC, the Koffler screened Argentinian films 'Tango, A Story with Jews' / 'Tango, una historia con judíos' and 'Rio Klezmer' in December. KidLit! The Jewish Literary Festival for Children took place at the Prosserman JCC in February 2014. In March 2014, the Koffler presents 'Benedictus', by Israeli playwright and screenwriter Motti Lerner, a play reading by Toronto's Volcano Theatre.

The Koffler Chamber Orchestra's 2013-14 final season, led by former Toronto Symphony Orchestra concertmaster Jacques Israelievitch, included 'Music She Wrote, A Tribute to Canadian Woman Composers' featuring guest pianist Christina Petrowska-Quilico in November 2013, and 'From Europe to Israel' featuring the music of Julius Chajes, Dmitri Shostakovich, Ödön Pártos, and Pyotr Ilyich Tchaikovsky in March 2014.

The final Toronto Jewish Literary Festival was presented from May 25 to June 1, 2014 at various venues around the GTA. The 26th annual Helen and Stan Vine Canadian Jewish Book Awards were awarded at a ceremony on May 27, 2014 at the Toronto Reference Library.

The Koffler Gallery opened its 2013-14 season with the inaugural exhibition 'We're in the Library' (November 19, 2013 to January 19, 2014) in its new downtown Toronto space at Artscape Youngplace. Toronto artists Sara Angelucci, Barbara Astman, Adam David Brown, Michelle Gay, Ido Govrin, Vid Ingelevics and Jon Sasaki created new works engaging the context and history of the new space, formerly the library of the Shaw Street Public School. 'Moving to Stand Still' followed, featuring internationally acclaimed Israeli artist Sigalit Landau (February 6 to April 6, 2014), who represented Israel at the 2011 Venice Biennale. Part of a significant international tour with presentations in Moscow, Budapest, Tromsø and Toronto, the exhibition brought a selection of Landau's major video works to Canada for the first time. Solo exhibitions by Vancouver-based artist Adad Hannah (April 24 to June 8, 2014), and Toronto-based artist Penelope Stewart (June 26 to August 31, 2014) round out the 2013-14 season.

=== 2012-2013 ===
The 2012-13 season opened on September 3, 2012 with a performance by the Mexican klezmer band Klezmerson at the 2012 Ashkenaz Festival at Harbourfront Centre. On September 6, 2012, the Koffler presented a talk by author Roy Doliner at the Columbus Centre. Doliner, co-author of the international bestselling book 'The Sistine Secrets', spoke on hidden Jewish messages concealed in the Sistine Chapel.

In association with the exhibition 'Summer Special' and together with Suburban Beast, a Toronto-based multimedia theatre company, the Koffler presented 'Honesty' from October 18 to November 4 within Honest Ed's store. A performance intervention written and directed by Jordan Tannahill and starring Virgilia Griffith, 'Honesty' was presented in two acts: in the first act, 'Honest Work', Griffith moved through the store, quietly performing the real life duties of Honest Ed's employees. Visitors were encouraged to find Griffith in the store and engage with her, but she otherwise quietly went about performing her job as a real employee would. In the second act, 'Honest Stories', Griffith performed seven different monologues in seven different locations around the store, leading the audience on a performance promenade. The monologues were based on interviews with real Honest Ed's employees – and Griffith shape-shifted between voices, transcending age, gender, and race. NOW Magazine's theatre critic Jon Kaplan raved about the performance, calling it "a truly heartfelt experience" and giving it 4 out 5 stars (NNNN). In June 2013, Virgilia Griffith was nominated for a 2013 Dora Award for Outstanding Performance – Female (Independent Theatre Division) for 'Honesty'.

The Koffler returned to the International Festival of Authors (IFOA) with Koffler @ the IFOA on October 28, 2012 featuring British author Howard Jacobson, author of the 2010 Man Booker Prize-winning 'The Finkler Question', and 'Zoo Time' (2012). Finkler was in conversation with Dan Friedman, the Managing Editor of New York's 'The Jewish Daily Forward'. On November 1, 2012, the Koffler together with Size Doesn't Matter and Sternthal Books presented Tamar Tal's award-winning Israeli documentary 'Life in Stills' at the Bloor Hot Docs Cinema on November 1, 2012. The film screening was followed by a Q & A with the film's Ben Peter.

The Koffler Chamber Orchestra opened its 2012-13 season with 'Musical Crossroads' on Sunday December 2, 212 at Temple Emanu-El. The final performance of the Orchestra's season, 'Fuguing Around', was on March 10, 2013 at the Gladstone Hotel.

From February 17 to March 1, 2013, Koffler Arts and Ashkenaz Foundation presented the Canadian premiere and artist residency of internationally acclaimed Buenos Aires, Argentina-based musician, artist and educator Simja Dujov. Dujov's two-week artistic residency included educational activities with youth, including master classes with music students at TanenbaumCHAT and a two-week workshop with SKETCH, an organization focused on bringing cultural opportunities to homeless and underprivileged youth in Toronto.

The annual Toronto Jewish Literary Festival (formerly known as the Toronto Jewish Book Fair/Festival) was presented from June 1 to 9, 2013. The "re-envisioned" Festival focused on literary programs geared towards diverse audiences in different locations and in partnership with other Jewish organizations across the City of Toronto and in Vaughan. Participating authors included Fania Oz-Salzberger, David Layton, Irving Abella, Frieda Forman, Bill Gladstone, Pierre Anctil, Benjamin Hackman, Ronna Bloom, Jacob Scheier, Dr. Nora Gold, Martin Levin, Cary Fagan, and Beverley Slopen. Festival events were held at the Miles Nadal JCC, Beth David Synagogue, Ben McNally Books, the Toronto Reference Library, and the Schwartz/Reisman Centre. Partnering organizations included the Miles Nadal JCC, Committee for Yiddish, Friends of Yiddish, Toronto Workmen's Circle, ShaRna Foundation, Canada-Israel Cultural Foundation, Ontario Jewish Archives, Jewish Fiction.net, Leo Baeck Day School, Schwartz/Reisman Centre, and PJ Library.

The 25th annual Helen and Stan Vine Canadian Jewish Book Awards were awarded at a ceremony on June 6, 2013 at the Bram and Bluma Appel Salon at the Toronto Reference Library. Hosted by former President & Publisher of Penguin Books Canada, Cynthia Good, the 2013 award winners included Aili and Andres McConnon for 'Road to Valour: A True Story of World War II Italy, the Nazis, and the Cyclist Who Inspired a Nation' (Doubleday); Nancy Richler for 'The Imposter Bride' (Harper Collins); Matti Friedman for 'The Aleppo Codex: A True Story of Obsession, Faith, and the Pursuit of an Ancient Bible' (Algonquin Books); Julija Šukys for 'Epistolophilia: Writing the Life of Ona Simaite' (University of Nebraska Press); Isa Milman for 'Something Small To Carry Home' (Quattro Books); L. Ruth Klein for 'Nazi Germany, Canadian Responses: Confronting Antisemitism in the Shadow of War' (McGill-Queen's University Press); Pierre Anctil for 'Jacob-Isaac Segal 1869-1954, Un poète yiddish de Montréal et son milieu' (Presses de l'Universite Laval); and Sharon E. McKay for 'Enemy Territory' (Annick Press).

The Koffler Gallery began its final season of Off-Site programming in 2012-13. 'Local Colour Info Centre' at Miracle Thieves (October 4 to November 11, 2012) was a solo exhibition featuring the work of Toronto artist Erica Brisson. Inspired by tourism information centres as well as the process of public consultation, Brisson set up a social space where passersby could share their personal interpretations of the city's intentional or informal landmarks. Saskatchewan-based sculptor Clint Neufeld's solo exhibition 'Pipe Dreams of Madame Récamier', off-site at General Hardware Contemporary, ran from January 10 to March 3, 2013. Off-site exhibitions by Toronto's Corwyn Lund and São Paulo's Iara Freiberg followed in 2013.

In fall 2013, the Koffler Gallery opened its 2013-2014 season of exhibitions in its new home at Artscape Youngplace in downtown Toronto.

=== 2011-2012 ===
Koffler Arts presented Koffler @ the IFOA, a day of Russian-Jewish themed literary programs at Harbourfront Centre's International Festival of Authors on October 23, 2011. The day featured discussions on Soviet Jewry with authors Gal Beckerman ('When They Come for Us We'll Be Gone'), David Bezmozgis ('The Free World'), Gary Shteyngart ('Super Sad True Love Story') and Irwin Cotler, Canadian Member of Parliament (Mount Royal) and international human rights attorney. Award-winning Israeli novelist Michal Govrin and translator Peter Filkins also spoke on the subject of translation.

Koffler Arts was invited by the Art Gallery of Ontario to create a range of interpretive programs around the AGO's 2011 exhibition, 'Chagall and the Russian Avant-Garde: Masterpieces from the Collection of the Centre Pompidou, Paris'. The first was 'Chagall's Musical World', a two-hour free concert by the Koffler Chamber Orchestra in Walker Court at the AGO on November 20, 2011. Led by violinist and former Toronto Symphony Orchestra concertmaster Jacques Israelievitch, the Orchestra's performance featured pianist Andrew Burashko and Beyond the Pale's klezmer clarinetist Martin van de Ven. The Koffler Chamber Orchestra performed 'Music Off the Map', its second and final concert of the season on March 18, 2012 at Toronto's Gladstone Hotel.

Also in association with the AGO's Chagall exhibition, the Koffler presented 'Past Present: Chagall Through Toronto's Artists' on December 14, 2011 at the Weston Learning Centre, Art Gallery of Ontario. The evening of music, dance, performance and spoken word included the eight-piece jazz fusion ensemble The Thing Is, selections of contemporary choreography from Kaeja d'Dance, accordionist Sasha Luminsky with Jonno Lightstone, and the debut of an excerpt from 'Bella: The Colour of Love', performed by Yiddish jazz performer Theresa Tova together with Montreal pianist Matt Herskowitz.

In March 2012, the Koffler produced and presented 'Honeycomb Way', an artistic residency and concert featuring Jewish musical traditions from the Middle East and Eastern Europe. The two-week residency was led by Iraqi-Jewish violinist and oud player Yair Dalal and American trumpetist Frank London from the Grammy Award-winning The Klezmatics, and included the composition of new music with Toronto musicians Waleed Abdulhamid, Jaffa Road's Aviva Chernick, Samba Squad's Rick Shadrach Lazar, Lenka Lichtenberg, Demetrios Petsalakis, Debashis Sinha, and Maryem Tollar. The event culminated in a performance at the St. Lawrence Centre for the Arts on March 28, 2012. Dalal and London also taught a master class and visited several Toronto-area schools.

The 34th annual Toronto Jewish Book Festival (formerly known as the Toronto Jewish Book Fair) opened in June 2012 at the Bram and Bluma Appel Salon at the Toronto Reference Library. The Festival featured over 35 international and Canadian authors, panels, book launches, musical events, films, slideshows, student programs, and books for sale over a 4-day period. Opening night featured American author Shalom Auslander ('Foreskin's Lament: A Memoir', 'Hope: A Tragedy'); other talks/readings included Michele Landsberg ('Writing the Revolution'), Steven Gimbel ('Einstein's Jewish Science'), True North Records founder Bernie Finkelstein ('True North: A Life Inside the Music Business'), Carol Bishop-Gwyn and Fraidie Martz ('A Fiery Soul: The Life and Theatrical Times of John Hirsch' - also short-listed for the 2012 Governor General's Awards), David Berlin ('The Moral Lives of Israelis – Reinventing the Dream State'), Richard Brody ('The Patagonian Hare: A Memoir') and Lilian Nattel ('Web of Angels'). The Festival also featured a special spotlight on the Azrieli Foundation films 'Holocaust Survivor Memoirs', and a series of daytime children and school programs featuring Karen Levine on the 10th anniversary of the international bestselling 'Hana's Suitcase', and authors Aubrey Davis, Anne Dublin, and Lesley Simpson.

The Toronto Jewish Book Festival culminated in the 24th annual Helen and Stan Vine Canadian Jewish Book Awards on June 7, 2012. Hosted by broadcaster and host of CBC Radio One's 'The Sunday Edition' Michael Enright, the 2012 award winners included David Bezmozgis for 'The Free World' (HarperCollins Publishers Ltd.), Denis Vaugeois for 'Les Premiers Juifs D'Amérique 1760-1860: L'extraordinaire histoire de la famille Hart' (Septentrion), Eli Pfefferkorn for 'The Muselmann at the Water Cooler' (Academic Studies Press), Richard Marceau for 'Juif, Une Histoire Québécoise' (Éditions Du Marais), S. Weilbach for 'Singing from the Darktime: A Childhood Memoir in Poetry and Prose' (McGill- Queen's University Press), Kalman Weiser for 'Jewish People, Yiddish Nation: Noah Prylucki and the Folkists in Poland' (University of Toronto Press), Rebecca Margolis for 'Jewish Roots, Canadian Soil: Yiddish Culture in Montreal, 1905-1945' (McGill-Queen's University Press), Fraidie Martz and Andrew Wilson for 'A Fiery Soul: The Life and Theatrical Times of John Hirsch' (Véhicule Press), and Lesley Simpson for 'Yuvi's Candy Tree' (Kar-Ben Publishing).

Continuing with its Off-Site program, the Koffler Gallery presented four exhibitions in 2011-12. 'Spin Off: Contemporary Art Circling the Mandala', at 80 Spadina Ave. (September 22 to December 4, 2011) featured Aya Ben Ron (Israel), Mircea Cantor (France/Romania), Vandana Jain (USA), Gary James Joynes/Clinker (Canada), Melissa Shiff (Canada) and Jennifer Zackin (USA) and was guest curated by Evelyn Tauben. 'Museum of the Represented City', the first a solo exhibition at a public gallery by Toronto artist Flavio Trevisan was also off-site at 80 Spadina (January 19 to April 8, 2012). The exhibition featured three-dimensional maps representing Toronto neighborhoods and cityscapes and received press coverage with reviews the National Post, blogTO, and Torontoist. The Koffler Gallery presented the first Canadian survey of the works of internationally acclaimed Israeli photographer Adi Nes, off-site at Olga Korper Gallery (May 3 to June 2, 2012). A Featured Exhibition in the 2012 Scotiabank CONTACT Photography Festival, it included Nes' most prominent photographs from the 'Soldiers' (1994-2000), 'Boys' (2000) and 'Biblical Stories' (2003-2006) series, including 'Untitled (The Last Supper)' (1999). The exhibition received significant press coverage, including reviews in The Globe and Mail, National Post, Canadian Art, NOW Magazine, Toronto Standard, and Canadian Jewish News. The Koffler Gallery closed its 2011-12 season the group exhibition 'Summer Special', off-site at Honest Ed's store in Toronto (June 21 to November 11, 2012). Taking inspiration from the signs and show bills of Toronto's landmark discount store, the exhibition included site-specific installations both inside and outside the store by Toronto artists Corinne Carlson, Robin Collyer, Barr Gilmore, Jen Hutton, Sarah Lazarovic and Vancouver-based Ron Terada. Press coverage included the Toronto Star, NOW Magazine, Canadian Art, The Jewish Daily Forward, and blogTO. In association with the exhibition and the Toronto Fringe Festival, the Koffler presented a free concert in Honest Ed's alley with the Toronto band The Pining on July 12, 2012.

=== 2010-2011 ===
In 2010-11, the Koffler presented the 34th Annual Toronto Jewish Book Fair, from October 23 to 31, 2010 at Beth David B'nai Israel Beth Am Synagogue. Award-winning Israeli author and peace activist David Grossman opened the Fair and spoke on his new novel, 'To the End of the Land'. Tarek Fatah, political activist, writer, broadcaster, and founder of the Muslim Canadian Congress closed the Fair with his 2010 book, 'The Jew is not my Enemy: Unveiling the Myths that Fuel Muslim Anti-Semitism'. Other featured authors included Anna Porter ('The Ghosts of Europe'), George Gilder ('The Israel Test'), Harold Troper ('The Defining Decade'), David Brody ('Mourning and Celebration – Jewish, Orthodox and Gay Past and Present'), Lynda Fishman ('Repairing Rainbows: A True Story of Family'), Gregory Levey ('How to Make Peace in the Middle East in Six Months or Less Without Leaving Your Apartment'), Kate Taylor (novelist) ('A Man in Uniform'), Judie Oron ('Cry of the Giraffe'), Savyon Liebrecht ('The Women My Father Knew'), and Joseph Kertes ('Gratitude').

On October 19, 2010, the Koffler presented the Toronto premiere performance of Israeli jazz composer and bassist Avishai Cohen at the Isabel Bader Theatre, U of T. In November 2010, the 'One World, Double Take series' continued with a panel discussion on boundary-crossing artistic expression presented together with the Centre for Diaspora and Transnational Studies, U of T. The panel featured artist and curator Millie Chen, First Nations artist Arthur Renwick, actor Marika Schwandt, and David Shneer. Shneer, professor at the University of Colorado and editor of the books 'Queer Jews' and 'Torah Queeries', was the Koffler's scholar-in-residence in fall 2010, and gave talks on the Russian Jewish Diaspora and his original research into the Soviet Jewish photographers between the World Wars.

The Koffler Chamber Orchestra, led by former Toronto Symphony Orchestra concertmaster Jacques Israelievitch, performed three concerts: Music That Survived on November 7, 2010 at Temple Emanu-El; English Gems for Strings on Sunday, February 13, 2011 at the Conrad Centre for the Performing Arts, Kitchener; and Back to Bach, Viva Vivaldi on April 10, 2011 at the Gladstone Hotel (Toronto).

On May 4, 2011 the Koffler presented Texas-based singer, performer, author, and political activist Kinky Friedman at the St. Lawrence Centre for the Arts.

The 23rd annual Helen and Stan Vine Canadian Jewish Book Awards were held on May 30, 2010 at the Bram & Bluma Appel Salon at the Toronto Reference Library. The 2011 winners included Alison Pick, 'Far to Go' (House of Anansi Press), Tarek Fatah, 'The Jew is not my Enemy: Unveiling the Myths that Fuel Muslim Anti-Semitism' (McClelland & Stewart), Robert Eli Rubinstein, 'An Italian Renaissance: Choosing Life In Canada' (Urim Publications), Charles Foran, 'Mordecai: The Life and Times' (Random House Canada), Harold Troper, 'The Defining Decade: Identity, Politics, and the Canadian Jewish Community in the 1960s' (University of Toronto Press) and Judie Oron, 'Cry of the Giraffe' (Annick Press). The awards ceremony was hosted by award-winning and bestselling author Michael Wex.

The Koffler Gallery continued off-site in 2010-11 with the group exhibition 'MIXEDFIT' from September 21 to November 28, 2010. The exhibition, located within four Toronto Balisi stores, featured works silkscreened onto T-shirts by artists Millie Chen (Canada), Emelie Chhangur (Canada), Hannah Claus (Canada), Stefan Hoffmann (The Netherlands), and Dan Perjovschi (Romania) and was presented in conjunction with Printopolis: International Symposium on Printmaking. From February 17 to April 17, 2011, the Koffler Gallery presented 'Graphic Details: Confessional Comics by Jewish Women' off-site at the Gladstone Hotel (Toronto) and curated by Michael Kaminer and Sarah Lightman. The touring group exhibition featured original drawings, autobiographical comics and graphic novels from eighteen Canadian and international Jewish women artists, including Vanessa Davis, Bernice Eisenstein, Sarah Glidden, Miriam Katin, Aline Kominsky-Crumb, Miss Lasko-Gross, Sarah Lazarovic, Miriam Libicki, Sarah Lightman, Diane Noomin, Corinne Pearlman, Trina Robbins, Racheli Rotner, Sharon Rudahl, Laurie Sandell, Ariel Schrag, Lauren Weinstein (comics), and Ilana Zeffren. Stephen Cruise: 'Share the Moment', from May 5 to August 28, 2011, was a sculptural installation in the Sheppard Plaza, at Bathurst and Sheppard Streets, Toronto. The artist transformed the vacant Kodak Fotomat drive-through photo processing booth in the parking lot, rear-projecting images of photographs collected from the North York community. The installation was a feature exhibition of the 2011 Scotiabank CONTACT photography festival. The final Koffler Gallery exhibition of the 2010-11 season was 'Lyla Rye: Swing Stage'. A site-specific installation off-site at Olga Korper Gallery, 'Swing Stage' was a large wooden platform suspended with chains from the building's structural trusses supporting the roof. A circular screen displayed a video projection referencing the view out of the round window atop the eastern gallery wall. The video spanned a 1930s rendering of the building, footage recorded on site, and a Google Earth model view of the neighbourhood. The exhibition received press coverage in the National Post, on Canadian Art (magazine)'s website, Akimblog and Azure magazine's blog.

=== 2009-2010 ===
In 2009-10, Koffler Arts presented the second year of off-site programming around the greater Toronto area, the first year of arts education in the new Prosserman JCC facilities, and programs in the new spaces on Sherman Campus, including the book review series 'Treasures in Jewish Literature' and the screening of the Israeli mini-series 'A Touch Away'. The 'crEATivity club', presented together with the Prosserman JCC, was held the last Wednesday of every month and featured interactive cultural programming during the day.

The 33rd annual Toronto Jewish Book Fair was held from October 24 to November 1, 2009 in the renovated Lipa Green Centre for Community Jewish Services. Over twenty-five authors were featured, including Noah Alper ('Business Mensch: Timeless Wisdom for Today's Entrepreneur'), Michael Wex ('How to be a Mentsh and Not a Shmuck: The Secrets of the Good Life from the Most Unpopular People on Earth'), Seymour Epstein ('From Couscous to Kasha'), David G. Roskies ('Yiddishlands'), Fred Kaufman ('Searching for Justice'), David Sax ('Save the Deli'), Lily Poritz Miller ('In a Pale Blue Light'), Nava Semel ('And the Rat Laughed'), Marc H. Stevens ('Escape, Evasion and Revenge'), Rabbi Erwin Schild ('And Miles to Go Before I Sleep: Six Walks With a Day of Rest'), Rosanne Bernard ('Knittishisms: The Zen of Jewish Knitting'), Kathy Kacer and Sharon McKay ('Whispers from the Camps'), Lauren Kirshner ('Where We Have to Go'), Cary Fagan ('Valentine's Fall'), Sidura Ludwig ('Holding My Breath'), Adam Sol ('Jeremiah, Ohio'), Aviva Allen ('The Organic Kosher Cookbook'), Karen Fisman ('Adventure in Latkaland'), and Kathy Clark ('Guardian Angel House').

On November 8, 2009, the Koffler presented Israeli musician Kobi Oz at the Mod Club Theatre in Toronto. Oz, lead singer of the Israeli band Teapacks, performed 'Psalms for the Perplexed' for the first time outside of Israel. On November 18, 2009, the Koffler presented the Toronto premiere of British-born Israeli Robbie Gringras' one-man play, 'About the Oranges', "a short play about suicide bombs" in which Gringras "stripped the Middle East conflict down to its essentials: pain and comedy." The following night at the Miles Nadal JCC, Gringras moderated the discussion 'Staging Struggle', as part of 'One World, Double Take' series. A panel consisting of Philip Akin (Obsidian Theatre Company, Toronto), Majdi Bou-Matar (the MT Space - Multicultural Theatre, Kitchener), Jennifer Herszman Capraru (Theatre Asylum, Toronto and ISôKo, Rwanda), and David Yee (fu-GEN Theatre Company, Toronto) examined theatre as a force for social change.

On January 27, 2010, the Koffler presented the first 'Musical Melding' series performance, featuring Toronto-based Juno-nominated world music group Jaffa Road together with Guelph-based Eccodek, at Lula Lounge. On April 25, 2010 the second 'Musical Melding' performance took place at Hugh's Room and featured Jaffa Road performing together with Iraqi-Jewish musician Yair Dalal. While in Toronto, Dalal played at elementary and secondary schools and taught master classes on Iraqi and Jewish-Arabic music.

In March 2010, the Koffler presented 'Cine-Seder Roundtable' at Victoria College, University of Toronto, together with the Centre for Jewish Studies. A panel of U of T professors discussed Toronto-artist Melissa Shiff's video sculpture 'Cine-Seder Plate', installed for that night.

The Koffler Chamber Orchestra, led by former Toronto Symphony Orchestra concertmaster Jacques Israelievitch, performed three concerts: 'Mendelssohn and More' on November 22, 2009 at Temple Emanu-El, Toronto; 'From Sweden to Italy with Stops in Jerusalem and Prague' on February 28, 2010 at Shaar Shalom Synagogue, Thornhill; and 'An Italian Music Holiday' on May 2, 2010 at the Conrad Centre for the Performing Arts in Kitchener, Ontario.

The 22nd annual Helen and Stan Vine Canadian Jewish Book Awards were held on May 27, 2010 at the Al Green Theatre, Miles Nadal JCC. The 2010 winners included Robin McGrath, 'The Winterhouse' (Creative Book Publishing), Allan Levine, 'Coming of Age: A History of the Jewish People of Manitoba' (Jewish Heritage Centre of Western Canada and Heartland Associates), Michael Marrus, 'Some Measure of Justice: The Holocaust Era Restitution Campaign of the 1990s' (University of Wisconsin Press), Eva Wiseman, 'Puppet' (Tundra Books), David Sax, 'Save the Deli' (McClelland & Stewart), Kenneth Sherman, 'What the Furies Bring' (The Porcupine's Quill), Jeffrey Veidlinger, 'Jewish Public Culture in the Late Russian Empire' (Indiana University Press), Goldie Sigal, 'Stingy Buzi and King Solomon' (Lomir Hofn Press) and a Special Achievement Award to Howard Engel.

The Koffler Gallery continued to program off-site during 2009-10, presenting Joshua Neustein: 'Margins' from June 27, 2009 to March 28, 2010 at the Royal Ontario Museum (ROM). Organized by the Koffler Gallery and the Institute for Contemporary Culture (ICC) at the ROM, the exhibition ran concurrently with the ROM exhibition 'Dead Sea Scrolls: Words that Changed the World'. The Koffler Gallery also presented the group exhibition 'how good are your dwelling places' from January 14 to March 14, 2010. Curated by Rochester-based curator Cyril Reade and located in a vacant residential and commercial space at 23 Beverley Street in Toronto, the exhibition featured works by artists Rita Bakacs, Susan Lakin, Ross Racine and Allen Topolski. 'Auguststrasse 25', by Toronto-based sound artist E.C. Woodley, was presented from April 22 to May 30, 2010, in the Kiever Synagogue in Kensington Market, Toronto. The multi-media exhibition within one of Toronto's oldest synagogues recreated a living-room setting typical of a middle-class Jewish home from 1920's Germany, and featured an in-character actress, sounds from 1920's Berlin radio, and period furniture. The Gallery closed the 2009-10 season with Panya Clark Espinal: 'Vagabond Vitrine' from June 27 to August 1, 2010, a sculptural installation located at the Mon Ton Window Gallery on College Street, Toronto.

=== 2008-2009 ===
In 2008-09, the Koffler presented Israeli art historian Gideon Ofrat in a two-month residency that included a series of public talks on Israeli and Jewish art and art history at the Miles Nadal JCC, and presentations to schools and community groups. The Koffler also presented Israeli musician David Broza on December 23, 2008 at the Leah Posluns Theatre.

From November 1 to 9, 2008, the Koffler presented the 32nd annual Toronto Jewish Book Fair at the Leah Posluns Theatre. Speakers included Alan Dershowitz ('The Case Against Israel's Enemies') on opening night, Ronald Aronson ('Living Without God'), Rabbi Elyse Goldstein ('New Jewish Feminism'), Arie Kaplan ('From Krakow to Krypton: Jews and Comic Books'), Lisa Alcalay Klug ('Cool Jew: The Ultimate Guide for Every Member of the Tribe'), Rabbi Joseph B. Meszler ('A Man's Responsibility'), Pearl Sofaer ('Baghdad to Bombay: In the Kitchens of My Cousins'), Bonnie Stern ('Friday Night Dinners'), Gerald Tulchinsky ('Canada's Jews: A People's Journey'), Richard Ungar ('Even Higher'), Barrie A. Wilson ('How Jesus Became a Christian'), Anita Diamant ('The Red Tent'), Karen Levine ('Hana's Suitcase'), Kathy Kacer ('The Diary of Laura's Twin'), Ami Sands Brodoff ('The White Space Between'), Gina Roitman ('Tell Me a Story, Tell Me the Truth'), Morley Torgov ('A Good Place To Come From and Murder in A-Major'), Howard Shrier ('Buffalo Jump') and Jan Rehner ('Just Murder and On Pain of Death').

In December 2009, the Koffler presented 'Crackin' Up: Canadian Mosaic Comedy Night' at The Rivoli, featuring Daniel Woodrow, Ron Josol, Arthur Simeon, Simon Rakoff, and Lori Pearlstein.

The Koffler Chamber Orchestra, founded in 2005 and led by former Toronto Symphony Orchestra concertmaster Jacques Israelievitch, performed three concerts: 'From the Old World to the New World: Music of England and America' on November 16, 2008 at Hart House (University of Toronto); 'Folk Feast' on February 22, 2009 at Temple Emanu-El; and 'From Russia with Love' on May 31, 2009 at the Toronto Centre for the Arts.

The 21st annual Helen and Stan Vine Canadian Jewish Book Awards were held on May 25, 2009 at the Al Green Theatre, Miles Nadal JCC. The awards, which recognize Canadian writing on Jewish themes and subjects, are presented in the genres of fiction, non-fiction, history, poetry, Holocaust literature, biography and memoir, scholarship, and youth children's literature. The 2009 winners included Peter C. Newman, 'Izzy: the Passionate Life and Turbulent Times of Izzy Asper' (HarperCollins Canada), Ami Sands Brodoff, 'The White Space Between' (Second Story Press), Barrie Wilson, 'How Jesus Became Christian' (Random House Canada), Joseph Kertes, 'Gratitude' (Penguin Books Canada), Isa Milman, 'Prairie Kaddish' (Coteau Books), Reinhold Kramer, 'Mordecai Richler: Leaving St. Urban' (McGill-Queen's University Press), David G. Roskies, 'YiddishLands' (Wayne State University Press), and Kathy Kacer, 'The Diary of Laura's Twin' (Second Story Press).

The Koffler Gallery presented the exhibitions Nina Levitt: 'Thin Air', from March 6 to April 18, 2008; Karilee Fuglem: 'here within our curving spaces' from May 15 to July 13, 2008; and Akira Yoshikawa: 'the way of now' from September 11 to November 30, 2008. Yoshikawa's exhibition was the last to be held in the former Gallery space in the BJCC. The Gallery was demolished along with the Koffler offices and the BJCC in spring/summer 2009 to prepare for construction of the new Sherman Campus and Koffler Arts.

In the interim, the Koffler Gallery began to program off-site at locations around Toronto. The first off-site exhibition was Iris Häussler: 'Honest Threads', from January 22 to March 8, 2009. The exhibition was presented on the second floor of Honest Ed's, a large discount store located at Bathurst and Bloor Streets in Toronto. Haussler's project, which garnered media attention in the Toronto Star, National Post, The Globe and Mail, Canadian Jewish News, CBC Radio, Now (newspaper) and Fiberarts, invited "visitors to wear and live with an article of clothing or accessory they've borrowed from the exhibit, donated by strangers who provide background information on their item."

The Koffler Gallery's second off-site project was Diane Landry: 'The Magic Shield', March 19 to May 3, 2009 at the Beaver Hall Gallery.

== Controversies ==
=== Artist Boycott of the Koffler Centre ===
In May 2021, Koffler Arts was the target of an artist boycott led by a number of Toronto artists, art organizations, and the Palestinian Campaign for the Academic and Cultural Boycott of Israel (PACBI). Over 450 artists and 26 art organizations signed the boycott. The boycott asked members of the arts community "not to show at, collaborate with, or participate in any events taking place at the Koffler Centre of the Arts" until the demands of the boycott were met.

=== Tony Kushner and UJA controversy ===
In March 2016, the UJA Federation of Greater Toronto – a Jewish charity whose mission is to "preserve and strengthen the quality of Jewish life in Greater Toronto, Canada, Israel and around the world" – disassociated itself from Koffler Arts' presentation of Pulitzer Prize-winning American playwright and Academy Awards-nominated screenwriter, Tony Kushner.

The UJA cited Kushner's involvement in the group Jewish Voice for Peace (JVP), to which Kushner sat on the advisory Board, and which supports the BDS Boycott, Divestment and Sanctions movement. Although Kushner acknowledged his involvement in the JVP group, he denied he supports the BDS movement.

In a Globe and Mail article, Kushner accused the UJA of "McCarthyism" and a "smear campaign." Said Kushner in the Globe, "I'm honestly really disgusted by what [the UJA] did and I'm very angry about it. It's depressing that – even in Canada – this kind of censorious, illiberal and really disgraceful behaviour is seen as acceptable."

Koffler Arts, financially supported by the UJA Federation, went ahead with the planned Tony Kushner in Conversation event despite the UJA's disassociation.

=== Reena Katz controversy ===
In May 2009 Koffler Arts announced it was disassociating itself from artist Reena Katz as a result of her support for Israel Apartheid Week, and a petition that she signed "condemning Zionism to the dustbin of history." The Koffler Centre stated that such activities undermine the existence of Israel as a Jewish state. As stated on its website, undated documents say that the existence of Israel as a Jewish state is a core value of The Koffler. These documents did not exist at the time the controversy began. The website also stated that "[w]hile we will support artists with diverse views about Israel, we will not endorse anyone who calls for the demise of Israel as a Jewish state." Katz "categorically rejects" this interpretation of her position.

Koffler Arts has kept its contractual financial obligations to the project, 'each hand as they are called', which was planned to be associated with Toronto's Luminato festival. Katz' show was to be a non-political celebration of Jewish history in Kensington Market, which the 'Toronto Star' described as "a gentle exploration of the layers of multi-ethnic immigrant history in Kensington Market, played out on the market's streets in performance and, in one notably warm-fuzzy intervention, a game of mah jongg between members of a Jewish seniors' centre and a class of Grade 8 students at a nearby school." The Centre's objection was not to the planned installation itself, which they had heartily approved of every step of the way, but to Katz' anti-Zionist views and activism (which was seen as undermining Israel as a Jewish state), prompting Koffler's action to be described as blacklisting by critics. The Centre's response was "Just as every individual has a right to freedom of expression, any organization is free to choose with whom it partners."

Katz and independent curator Kim Simon, hired by the Koffler Centre to curate the project, had been working on it for well over a year, and claim that from the beginning they had made Katz's critical activism concerning Israel clear to the Centre's own curator, Mona Filip (their link to the Centre) who in turn must have told executive director Starr about it. Katz herself describes the effect of having only a single one-hour meeting with Starr on May 8, who then immediately issued the Koffler's press statement nationally, as a "stonewalling of internal dissent and debate… At no point along the way was I asked to represent myself, my ideas, or the mandates of the groups I belong to, despite amicable, almost daily contacts with Filip for many months."

As a result of the Centre's actions, 4 of the 34 artists pulled out of Koffler's summer art party and fundraiser 'The Wrecking Ball' as a protest. One artist, Gwen MacGregor, stated "It really speaks to fundamental issues about freedom of expression and freedom of association. It's the thin edge of the wedge, in terms of censorship, and that's a slippery slope." Another artist, Yvonne Singer, the only professional artist on the Koffler Board and an associate professor at York University, where she was in charge of the graduate program in visual art, resigned from the Board. She said, concerning a meeting of the Board's Arts Advisory Committee on May 1 where Starr had raised the issues, "Several of us objected. The exhibition had nothing to do with [Katz's] political views, and in any case, she had a right to them as a citizen." Singer again objected at the May 4 meeting of the full Board, but a majority agreed with Starr. In addition dozens of faculty from OCAD and York Universities signed a letter to the Koffler Centre stating that the latter's "decision is a highly political act that serves to discredit Katz, her work and the validity of the political views and opinions she may hold as a Jew, an artist, and a social citizen."

In its FAQ (undated and not posted until well after the controversy began), Koffler Arts denies censorship since it did not cancel the exhibition and continued to fund it. They claim that the decision as to whether the exhibition continues remains in the hands of the artist and curator. This point of view was not accepted by journalists such as Murray Whyte, visual arts reporter at the Toronto Star, or Susan G. Cole, senior entertainment editor at Toronto's 'Now' weekly magazine, nor was it the view of then Board member Yvonne Singer who told Whyte she "knew right away it would scuttle the whole thing. You can't dissociate like that, and reasonably expect it to survive." Cole noted the domino effect that the Koffler's quickly issued press release had on others involved in the project, in effect virtually terminating it 12 days before it was to open.

'each hand as they are called' finally went forward after the Koffler's lawyer reached a settlement with Ms. Katz's lawyer and was presented (in a much modified form) from October 1 to 25, 2009.

The Toronto Arts Council, which provides substantial financial support to The Koffler, addressed the situation: "We're asking (Koffler) if this signals a change in policy," said Claire Hopkinson, TAC's executive director. "We're taking it very seriously." While the Toronto Arts Council after a formal review has confirmed that its funding of The Centre will continue, it also noted that Koffler had been "in violation of the City of Toronto's non-discrimination policy regarding an individual's right to freedom of political association" but declined to say what changes they were required to make.

== Affiliations ==
The Museum is affiliated with CMA, CHIN, and Virtual Museum of Canada.

== See also ==
- Murray Koffler
