= Koffler Centre =

The Koffler Centre can refer to two centres named after Murray Koffler:

- Koffler Student Centre at the University of Toronto
- Koffler Centre of the Arts
