= Jacques Israelievitch =

French violinist (1948–2015)

Jacques Israelievitch, CM (May 6, 1948 – September 5, 2015) was a French violinist, and one of Canada's foremost chamber musicians.

Born in Cannes, France, at 11 years old he was the youngest graduate in the history of the Le Mans Conservatory. He went on to study at the Conservatoire de Paris with Henryk Szeryng and René Benedetti, receiving three first prizes at age 16. He also studied at Indiana University School of Music with Josef Gingold, János Starker, William Primrose and Menahem Pressler.

Israelievitch also performed as a soloist and chamber musician, collaborating with artists such as Carlo Maria Giulini, Jukka-Pekka Saraste, Emanuel Ax, Yefim Bronfman, and Yo-Yo Ma. In 1972, Sir Georg Solti appointed him as assistant concertmaster of the Chicago Symphony Orchestra, making him the youngest member of the orchestra. He then served as concertmaster of the St. Louis Symphony Orchestra. He served as concertmaster of the Toronto Symphony Orchestra from 1988 to 2008. From 2005 to 2014, Israelievitch served as the music director of the Koffler Chamber Orchestra at the Koffler Centre of the Arts.

He recorded works by Ludwig van Beethoven and R. Murray Schafer with the Toronto Symphony Orchestra, violin works by Edvard Grieg, and Mozart's Sinfonia Concertante. His CD Suite Hebraique was nominated for a Juno award. Other CDs include Suite Enfantine, Suite Fantaisie, Suite Française, and Solo Suite. In 2006, he made a complete recording of the 42 Kreutzer Etudes, the first of its kind. The CD and the accompanying score were praised internationally. Israelievitch also played the extensive violin solos in the acclaimed St. Louis Symphony Orchestra recording of Swan Lake conducted by Leonard Slatkin.

In 1999, Israelievitch and his second son, Michael (a percussionist) formed the Israelievitch Duo. They commissioned and premiered works by distinguished contemporary composers including Michael Colgrass, Srul Irving Glick, and Murray Adaskin. The CD Hammer and Bow was the Israelievitch Duo's only full-length CD.

He taught at Indiana University, and was a faculty member of the University of Toronto, the Royal Conservatory of Music and York University. During the summer, he was the chair of strings and taught violin performance and chamber music at the Chautauqua Institution. He was also a member of the New Arts Trio, which has been in residence at Chautauqua since 1978.

In 1995, Israelievitch was honored by France with the title of Chevalier (knight) of the Ordre des Arts et des Lettres (Order of Arts and Literature). In 2004, he was made Officier (Officer) of the Order. He was named a Member of the Order of Canada in 2015.

Israelievitch died in Toronto on September 5, 2015, of lung cancer at the age of 67. He was survived by his wife Gabrielle, sons David, Michael, and Joshua, and two grandchildren.
