= Koffler Scientific Reserve =

Biological field station in Canada

Koffler Scientific Reserve at Jokers Hill
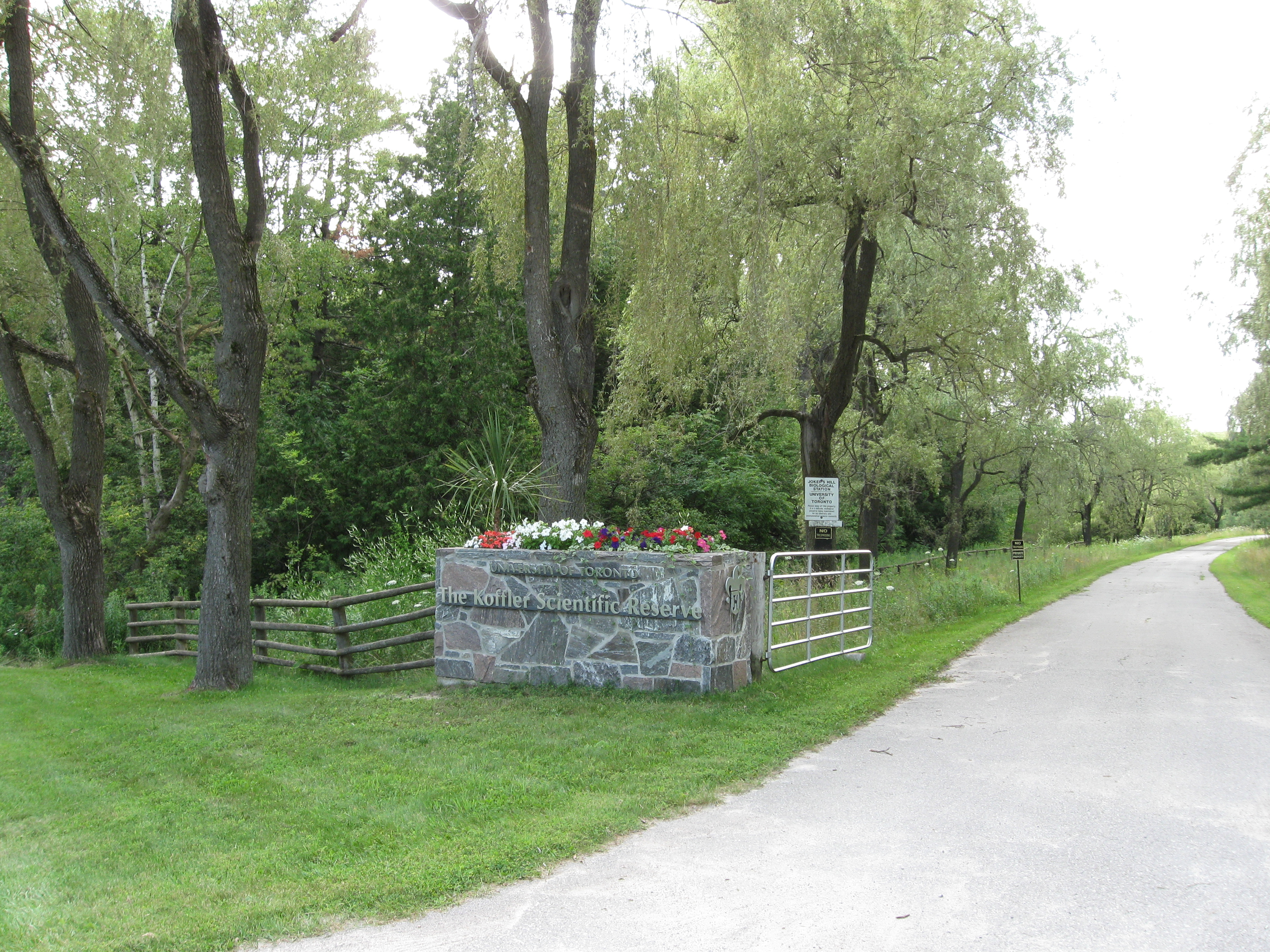
- Koffler Scientific Reserve, main entrance
- Interactive map of Koffler Scientific Reserve at Jokers Hill
- Type: Research station
- Location: King, Ontario, Canada
- Coordinates: 44°01′48″N 79°31′39″W
- Area: 348 hectares (860 acres)
- Operator: University of Toronto
- Open: 2002
- Website: ksr.utoronto.ca

The Koffler Scientific Reserve at Jokers Hill is a biological field station belonging to and managed by the University of Toronto. It occupies roughly 348 hectares of old fields, wetlands, grasslands, and forest lands in King Township, on the western portion of the Oak Ridges Moraine and close to the town of Newmarket, Ontario, Canada. The site's ecosystems are home to many species of plants and animals.

== History ==
Starting in the 1880s, much of the present day's Jokers Hill was heavily deforested and settled as 16 small farms. In the 1950s, Major General Clarence Churchill Mann and his wife Billie McLaughlin Mann consolidated these farms and developed the property as a horse farm and estate; a race track, barns, pastures, and other equestrian relics remain from this era. The property was purchased by the Koffler family in 1969, and served as their country home. They retained noted architect Napier Simpson to expand and remodel the estate house, first built by the Manns. The Koffler's hosted a variety of charitable and sporting events, including Canada's first three-day equestrian event competition. Guests to Jokers Hill during the Koffler years included Prince Philip, Princess Margaret, Pierre and Margaret Trudeau, and numerous luminaries from the Canadian business and arts communities.

The Kofflers turned over the estate to the University of Toronto in 1995. Estimated to be worth $18 million at the time, it is the most valuable land gift ever given to a Canadian university. Under the guidance of founding Director, Prof. Ann Zimmerman, Koffler Scientific Reserve became a favored site for biological research by members of the University's Department of Ecology and Evolutionary Biology and its Faculty of Forestry. In 2007, Arthur E. Weis, a longtime professor of evolutionary biology at the University of California, was hired by Toronto to succeed Zimmerman as director. He oversaw a construction project that converted the former 'racing barn' into the 'Laboratory for Biodiversity and Global Change Biology'.

== Natural heritage ==
Situated on the northwestern fringe of the Oak Ridges Moraine, the Koffler Scientific Reserve at Jokers Hill includes a variety of forest types which cover two thirds of the property. Wetlands with diverse species make up a small fraction. Lands once cleared for agriculture have re-vegetated naturally and now support stands of maple and beech, while hemlock dominates the wetter sections. Several eroded areas have been re-planted with red pine. The reserve includes a three-hectare stand of old-growth hardwood forest. Today, these forest and wetland communities serve as an "ecological observatory" where natural processes can be "monitored, measured and analyzed". More than 600 vascular plants, 150 birds, and 30 mammals have been recorded at this site.

The remaining third of the property encompasses hayfields and pastures from the days when the Reserve was an estate and staging ground for equestrian events. Today these lands serve as an 'ecological laboratory' where researchers carry out experiments that subject theories about the environment to scientific testing.

The Province of Ontario's Ministry of Natural Resources designated the Koffler Scientific Reserve as both an Earth Sciences Area of Natural and Scientific Interest (ANSI) for its unusual patterns of glacial deposit, and a Life Sciences ANSI.

The spread of invasive species remains a problem at Jokers Hill, and measures have been taken to control populations of Garlic Mustard (Alliaria petiolata) and Purple loosestrife (Lythrum salicaria).

== Research ==
Koffler Scientific Reserve at Jokers Hill (KSR) is the site of several ongoing research projects, including studies in forest ecology, soil ecology, biological invasions, plant defences, fungal biodiversity, pollinating insects, plant reproductive ecology, and ecological impacts of global change. Over its first 15 years of operation, KSR scientists published more than 65 reports on research conducted at the Reserve. These researchers were from all three University of Toronto campuses, plus the University of Guelph, York University, and the University of New Brunswick in Canada, and from abroad, Cornell University, University of Pittsburgh, Université de Paris and Université de Bordeaux. Over the same period, graduate students working onsite completed 15 Ph.D. dissertations and 23 M.Sc. theses. Completion of the new laboratory, which includes facilities for DNA analysis, and the installation of field equipment to simulate climate warming in experimental field plots, have increased the depth and range of KSR's research capabilities.

== Teaching and outreach ==
The Koffler Scientific Reserve at Jokers Hill is a 'living classroom' for undergraduate and graduate students pursuing university degrees in disciplines ranging from geography and biology to forestry and environmental science.

Among the Reserve's public education and outreach initiatives is an annual series of natural history workshops and guided nature walks. The Koffler Scientific Reserve has also engaged in collaborations with institutions like the Oak Ridges Trail Association, Bruce Trail Association, Ontario Nature, Lake Simcoe Region Conservation Authority and the York Region Department of Natural Heritage and Forestry, the has expanded its mission as a centre for learning in natural history and environmental stewardship.

== See also ==
- Organization of Biological Field Stations
