= Nina Levitt =

Canadian artist and educator

Nina Levitt is an artist who works primarily in the area of photography, installation, and video. Levitt is also an associate professor in the Department of Visual Art and Art History at York University.

== Biography ==
Levitt has shown her work extensively in Canada, and also in the United States, and the United Kingdom. Her work focuses on the experiences of women and frequently uses techniques which involve the reuse and manipulation of existing images, and video. Levitt's work has been extensively reviewed in publications such as: Canadian Art, the Toronto Star, and The Globe and Mail. Levitt has received commissions from the Gladstone Hotel, and Women's College Hospital.

Levitt also works in through research and received a Research Creation grant from the Social Science and Humanities Research Council. This work was focused on the story of British female spies. This work culminated in two exhibitions at the Koffler Gallery and Robert McLaughlin Gallery.
