= Nicole Collins =

Canadian artist

- Born: 1962 (age 63–64)
- Education: University of Guelph; University of Toronto
- Spouse: Michael Davidson
- Website: www.nicolecollins.com

Nicole Collins (born 1962) is a contemporary Canadian artist whose work, which takes the form of painting, performance, video, and sound, explores the effect of time, accumulation, force and heat on visceral materials. She currently teaches at OCAD University.

== Education ==
She earned a BA in fine arts from University of Guelph in 1988 and an MA in visual studies from University of Toronto in 2009.

== Artistic career ==
Collins has shown her work internationally, in galleries in Canada, America, Japan, Switzerland, and England. In 2013, Collins and her husband Michael Davidson began an art gallery in their living room at 26 McKenzie Crescent, Toronto.

=== Solo exhibitions ===
Year	Exhibition	Gallery	Location
1994	Marked	Women’s Art Resource Centre	Toronto
1994	Blessure	Gallery 788	Toronto
1998	Given	Wynick/Tuck Gallery	Toronto
2000	Path	Wynick/Tuck Gallery	Toronto
2001	one mark	Wynick/Tuck Gallery	Toronto
2002	sample	Canadian Embassy Gallery	Tokyo
2003	branch	Wynick/Tuck Gallery	Toronto
2004	Dimension	Halde Gallery	Zurich
2006	Stroke for Stroke	Wynick/Tuck Gallery	Toronto
2018	Furthest Boundless	Koffler Gallery	Toronto

=== Group exhibitions ===
Year	Show	Gallery	Location
1989	University of Guelph fine arts graduate 25th anniversary alumni show	MacDonald Centre	Guelph, Onatario
1990	Housing: A Right	Powerplant	Toronto
1991	Roundup 91		Toronto
1991	CKOC Annual juried exhibition	Art Gallery of Hamilton	Hamilton, Ontario
1991	Chambermade	Embassy Hotel	London, Ontario
1992	Contemporary Canadian Painting	L’Etude Ader Tajan	Paris
1992	Roundup 92	80 Spadina Ave	Toronto
1992	Fleshcase installation	Embassy Hotel	London, Ontario
1993	Look ’93 annual juried exhibition	Gallery Lambton	Sarnia, Ontario
1993	Cabinet des Curiosites	La Chambre Blanche	Quebec City, Quebec
1993	Cover Me - site specific store-front installation	488 Queen Street W.	Toronto
1994	Merging XVI	Gallery 788	Toronto
1994	Mud	59 Adelaide East	Toronto
1995	Art with Heart Casey House benefit auction	Linda Genereux Gallery	Toronto
1995	Juicy Fruit	The Koffler Gallery	North York, Toronto
1996	Juicy Fruit	Art Gallery of Durham	Durham, Ontario
1996	GLO	Archive Inc.	Toronto
1996	Group show	Archive Digital Art Library	Toronto
1997	Summer Gallery artists exhibition	Wynick Tuck Gallery	Toronto
1997	R&D (Research & Development)	York Quay Gallery	Toronto
1997	Colour in the Square	Wynick Tuck Gallery	Toronto
1997	International Juried Exhibition of Encaustic Works	The Gallery at R&F	Kingston, New York, USA
1997	Art with Heart Casey House benefit auction	Leo Kamen and Wynick/Tuck Galleries	Toronto
1997	Advent	Wynick Tuck Gallery	Toronto
1998	Nicole Collins, Michael Davidson, Sheila Gregory, Milly Ristvedt: Painting	James Baird Gallery	St. John’s NF
1998	Informal Ideas 98.2, 14 Degrees of Abstraction	Wynick/Tuck Gallery	Toronto
1998	Layers	Wynick/Tuck Gallery	Toronto
1998	Art with Heart Casey House benefit auction	Leo Kamen and Wynick/Tuck Galleries	Toronto
1999	Informal Ideas 99.1:(Preview ’99)	Wynick/Tuck Gallery	Toronto
1999	Art 1999 Chicago, Seventh Annual Exposition of International Galleries of Contemporary Art		Chicago, USA
1999	Toronto: Under 40	Art Gallery of Ontario	Toronto
1999	TSA 30th Anniversary faculty show	Art Gallery at Harbourfront	Toronto
1999	Art with Heart Casey House benefit auction	Leo Kamen and Wynick/Tuck Galleries	Toronto
1999	Translinear - touring group exhibition	McMaster Museum of Art	Hamilton, Ontario
2000	Translinear - touring group exhibition	Mendel Art Gallery	Saskatoon
2000	Translinear - touring group exhibition	Tom Thomson Gallery	Owen Sound, Ontario
2001	Paintings Painted	Platform Gallery	London, UK
2001	Bra Joe from Kilimanjaro	University of Queensland Art Museum	Brisbane, Australia
2002	Whodunit? Ontario College of Art & Design fundraising auction		Toronto
2002	Letters for Literacy	Hart House, University of Toronto	Toronto
2003	Advent	Halde Galerie	Zurich Switzerland
2003	Art with Heart Casey House benefit auction	Art Gallery of Ontario	Toronto
2003	Whodunit? Ontario College of Art & Design fundraising auction		Toronto
2003	Motherlode (curated by Gretchen Sankey)	Women's Art Resource Centre	Toronto
2004	Advent	Halde Galerie	Zurich Switzerland
2004	informal ideas 04-01: (warm)	Wynick/Tuck Gallery	Toronto
2004	informal ideas 04-02: landscape	Wynick/Tuck Gallery	Toronto
2004	Death in the Studio: Studio Death Snapshots book project by Hannes Priesch + Niki Lederer	Book launch	Vienna, NYC and Toront
2005	Advent	Halde Galerie	Widen, Switzerland
2005	Whodunit? Ontario College of Art & Design fundraising auction		Toronto
2005	informal ideas 04:05, (please press landscape)	Wynick/Tuck Gallery	Toronto
2005	Crossing the Line	The Painting Center	New York
2006	you don't wanna miss that shit (curated by Katherine Mulherin)	Gladstone Hotel	Toronto
2006	Collins Waldburger White: Wax	Minarovich Gallery, Elora Centre for the Arts	Ontario
2006	OCAD Drawing and Painting Endowment Collection 2006	Great Hall, Ontario College of Art & Design	Toronto
2006	Whodunit? Ontario College of Art & Design fundraising auction		Toronto
2006	Pulse: Abstract Painting and Film (curated by Ingrid Jenkner and Barbara Sternberg)	Mount St Vincent University Gallery	
2007	Ann Thinghuus and Nicole Collins	Halde Galerie	Widen, Switzerland
2007	Hot Wax	The Rooms	St. John's, Newfoundland
2008	House Lights Left Bright (curated by Stacey Sproule)	1478 Dundas W	Toronto
2008	Monkey's Paw Shelf Label Project (curated by Keri Reid and Stephen Fowler)	Monkey's Paw Bookstore	Toronto
2008	Lightening Strikes Twice	Xpace Gallery	Toronto
2008	MVS Open Studio	University of Toronto	Toronto
2008	Pulse 2: Film and Painting After the Image curated by Barbara Sternberg	Wynick/Tuck Gallery	Toronto
2009	start Profs, work by professors from art institutions across Canada	Studio 21	Halifax
2009	MVS Graduate Exhibition	University of Toronto Art Centre	Toronto

=== Awards ===
- 1991: CKOC Annual Juried Exhibition, Art Gallery of Hamilton, Juror’s Award
- 1995: Art with Heart, Casey House benefit auction, Curator’s Choice
