= Ghazaleh Avarzamani =

Iranian-Canadian artist

- Born: 1980 (age 45–46); Tehran, Iran
- Education: Azad Art University, Central Saint Martins
- Known for: sculpture, installation
- Website: https://www.ghazalehavarzamani.com

Ghazaleh Avarzamani is an Iranian-born Canadian multidisciplinary artist who lives and works between London and Toronto.

== Biography ==
Born in Tehran, Iran, Avarzamani studied painting at Azad Art University, Tehran. She lived in Dubai and London where she completed a Master of Fine Arts at Central Saint Martins (2013), before arriving in Canada in 2016. She received her Canadian citizenship in 2021 and currently lives and works in London, UK.

== Artistic career ==
Avarzamani's large-scale interactive works address hegemonic power structures while exploring how institutional structures and educational methodologies can shape the psycho-social construction of knowledge. Frequently using everyday life and pop culture references, she makes art in and about public space that tests the limits of games and play as complex processes of social and political influence with radical possibilities for subversion, pleasure, deconstruction, and transformation.

Avarzamani's international residencies include SOMA Mexico City (2018) and the Delfina Foundation in London (2022). She was the recipient of the Red Mansion Prize in 2013, won the Monographic exhibition of the year from the Ontario Association of Art Galleries in 2019, and was longlisted for the Sobey Art Award in 2022.

== Selected works ==
From September 29, 2021, to January 9, 2022, Ghazaleh Avarzamani’s work Mashrabiya was installed in the Museum of Contemporary Art (MOCA) Toronto's GTA21 exhibition, which featured twenty-one artists with ties to the Greater Toronto Area. The bright blue window screen, seen from the outside front wall of the gallery as the first visible sign of the exhibition, allowed viewers to look out but not in and spoke to the accessibility of art museums and "the line between public and private space, the interplay between opacity and transparency, illusion and disillusion, as well as what happens when one cultural symbol is transposed into a foreign context."

Avarzamani's public artwork Forced Afloat was installed for the 2022 Toronto Biennial of Art in the former lot of a Pentecostal Church. Consisting of over 7,000 square feet of blue rubber mulch—made from recycled rubber and petroleum-derived tires and frequently used in children's playgrounds—placed into a circular cement frame, the work evokes the illusion of a pool and invites free public use while also commenting on the toxicity of its material. Forced Afloat creates a liminal and mutable space that exposes invisible social contracts that impose limitations on human relations and collective and individual freedoms.

== Selected exhibitions ==
Avarzamani's artwork has been shown extensively internationally in both solo and group exhibitions. Solo exhibitions include at the Aga Khan Museum in Toronto (2021, 2022), Galerie Nicolas Robert in Montreal (2021), Koffler Centre of the Arts in Toronto (2019), Ab-Anbar Gallery in Tehran (2016), Asia House in London (2014), Light Gallery in London (2013), and Etemad Gallery in Tehran (2013). Her numerous group exhibitions include at the Museum of Contemporary Art (MOCA) Toronto (2021), Arsenal Contemporary Art in Toronto (2020), Bocconi Art Gallery in Milan (2018), Artmark Gallery in Vienna (2016), Homa Gallery, in Tehran (2015), Etemad Gallery in Dubai (2012), and Gallery on the Corner in London (2011). In 2015, she curated the exhibition Jabberwocky at Ab-Anbar Gallery in Tehran.

== Selected collections ==
Avarzamani's work is held at Arsenal Contemporary in Montreal, MOCA Toronto, TD Collection, and at the Red Mansion in London.
