= Toronto Reference Library =

Largest branch of Toronto Public Library

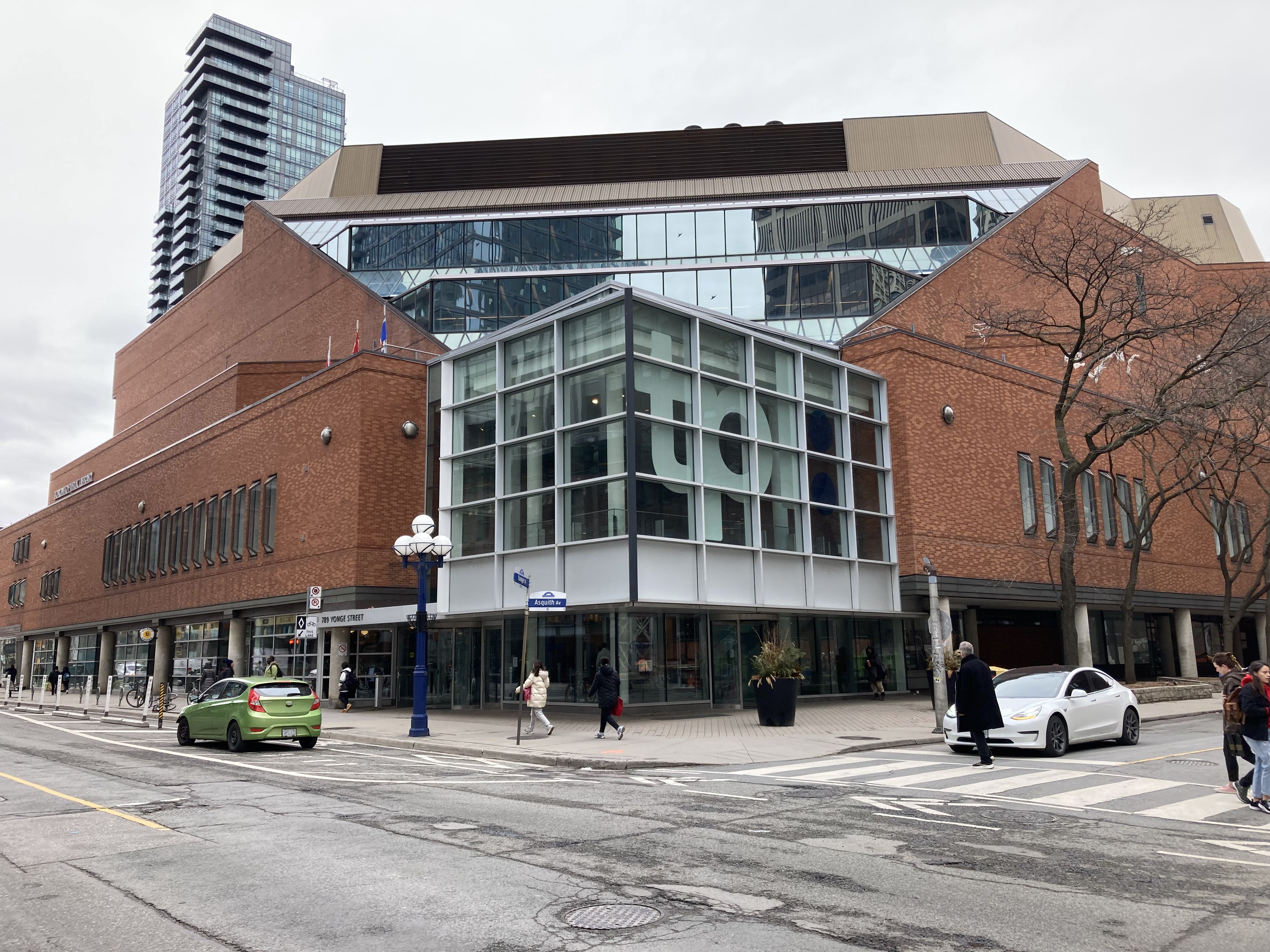
- Entrance of the Toronto Reference Library from Yonge Street and Asquith Avenue in 2023
- 43.671752°N 79.386697°W
- Location: 789 Yonge Street; Toronto, Ontario; M4W 2G8, Canada
- Type: Public reference library
- Established: 8 September 1909; 117 years ago (Note: The following date was when the Toronto Reference Library was opened to the public. The building the library is based in was opened to the public on 2 November 1977.)
- Architect: Raymond Moriyama (Note: Moriyama designed the Toronto Reference Library building opened in 1977. The first building to house the Toronto Reference Library was designed by Wickson & Gregg and Alfred H. Chapman.)
- Service area: City of Toronto
- Branch of: Toronto Public Library

Access and use
- Circulation: 375,830 (2018)

Other information
- Director: Gillian Byrne (manager)
- Public transit access: Bloor–Yonge
- Website: www.torontopubliclibrary.ca/torontoreferencelibrary/

The Toronto Reference Library is a public reference library in Toronto, Ontario, Canada. It is located on the corner of Yonge Street and Asquith Avenue, within the Yorkville neighbourhood of downtown Toronto and is the largest and most visited branch of Toronto Public Library (TPL).

Established in 1909, the Toronto Reference Library initially operated from another building on College Street. In the late-1960s, management of the library was assumed by the Metropolitan Toronto Library Board. Believing the space in the original structure to be inadequate, Raymond Moriyama was tasked to find a new site, and was later commissioned by the board to design a new building for the site. The new building was opened to the public in 1977 as the Metropolitan Toronto Reference Library, and the library continued to operate under that name until 1998, when it reverted to its original name. The building underwent renovations and expansion from 2009 to 2014.

The library is the largest public reference library in Canada, with an extensive collection of books, manuscripts, microfilm, and other items. Most items in its collection are designated for reference-use only; the public is unable to borrow these items for use outside the library. In addition to providing access to its collection, the library also hosts a number of public reading events, as well as provide technical access and services to the public.

== History ==
The earliest reference library opened in Toronto was the York Mechanics' Institute, opened to the public in 1830. Acting as a reference library and public resource, Mechanics' Institutes throughout the city served as predecessors to Toronto Public Library. TPL was established in 1884 within a former Mechanics' Institute building. During the late-19th century, TPL absorbed a number of Mechanics' Institutes Toronto, reorganizing them into public libraries.

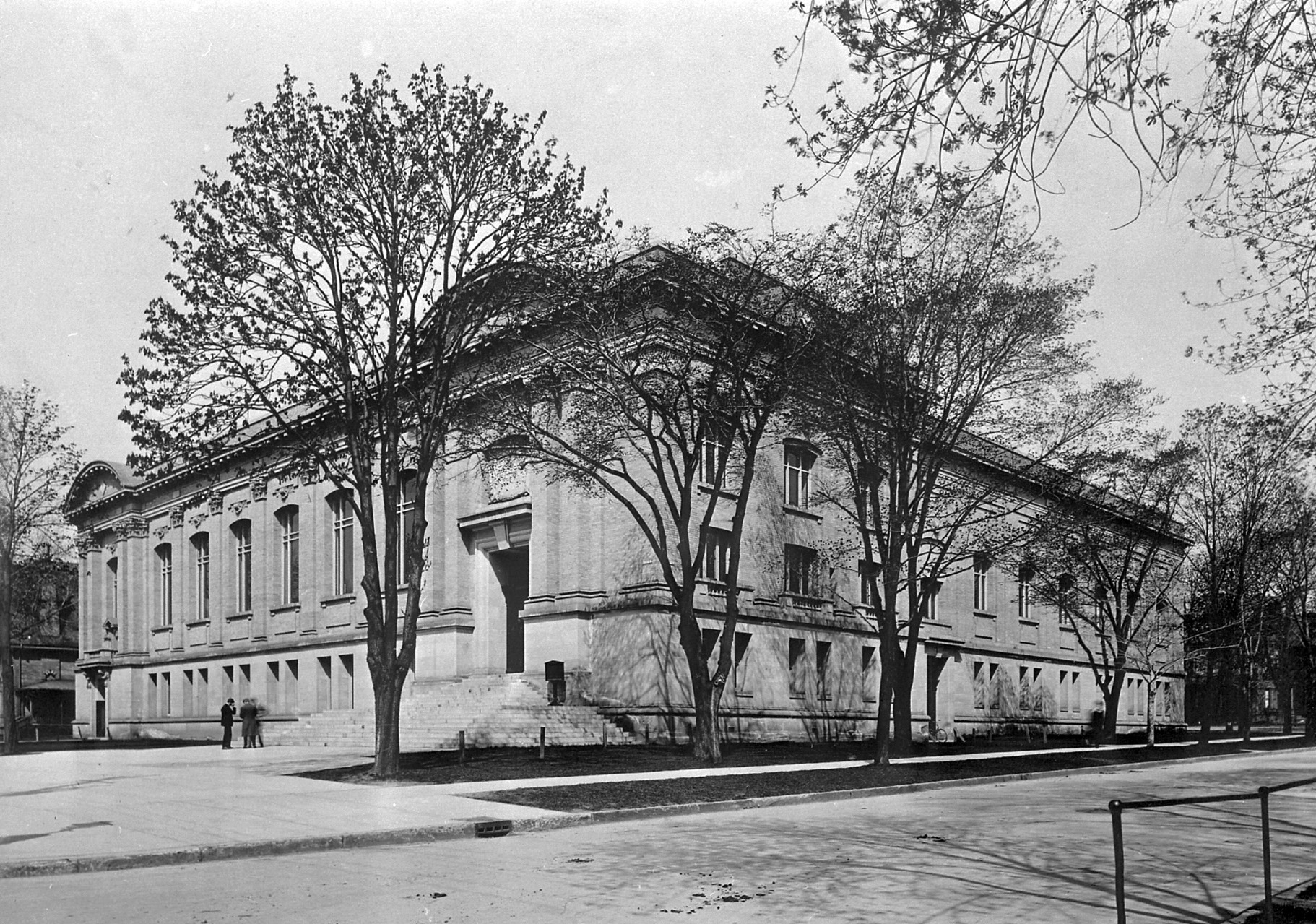
The original Toronto Reference Library building (now the Koffler Student Centre), c. 1911

On 8 September 1909, TPL officially opened the Toronto Reference Library at a building on the northwest corner of College and St. George streets. The Beaux-Arts styled building was designed by Wickson & Gregg and Alfred H. Chapman. The building was the largest Carnegie-funded library built in Ontario. When the reference library first opened, its collection contained 97,788 books. In addition to the reference library, a TPL branch with a circulating collection was completed in the basement of the building in 1930, and was opened on 21 April.

=== New building ===
In 1967, the Metropolitan Toronto Library Board was established by the Metropolitan Toronto government in order to bring together the resources and collections of the central libraries and library systems within Metro Toronto; including the Toronto Reference Library. By 1968, the board had decided to build a replacement building for the Toronto Reference Library, with spacing becoming an issue in the original 1909 building. Additionally, the board viewed the original building was situated far too west for it to properly serve as a library for the metropolitan region. In 1971, Raymond Moriyama was commissioned by the library board to perform a site study for a replacement building; with the board specifying the location had to be between St. Clair Avenue and Queen Street, and near a Toronto subway station. Moriyama eventually choose a location on Asquith and Yonge Street, partly due to its proximity to Bloor–Yonge station. In 1972, the library board had approved the purchase of the site for C$7 million, and allocated a further C$23 million to construct a new building.

The initial design presented by Moriyama was similar in design to the current building, although the original designs had the southern and western façade of the structure clad in reflective glass that became transparent at night; with concrete used on its other sides. A direct access point that connected the library's main lobby to Bloor-Yonge subway station was planned although it was not incorporated in the final design. Although the design was initially supported by the library board and the Metro Toronto government, the design faced opposition from the municipal government of Toronto; with the overuse of glass in the midst of the 1970s energy crisis being questioned, concerns that the structure would be too imposing in contrast to the rest of the neighbourhood, and budgetary concerns resulted in the initial design being rejected in December 1973. After several months of consultation with the local government, revised designs were approved in April 1974; which slightly reduced the size and height of the building, reduced its massing, and changed its cladding to brick.

Construction for the new building began in 1974, with the new building being opened to the public on Asquith Avenue and Yonge Street on 2 November 1977. The former reference library building was closed in 1977, and is presently used as the University of Toronto's Koffler Student Centre.

As a result of Metropolitan Toronto's dissolution and amalgamation into Toronto in 1997, the Metropolitan Toronto Library Board was also dissolved and amalgamated into the new Toronto Public Library system. In 1999, TPL launched the Virtual Reference Library, providing an online catalogue of the library's collection.

==== 21st century ====
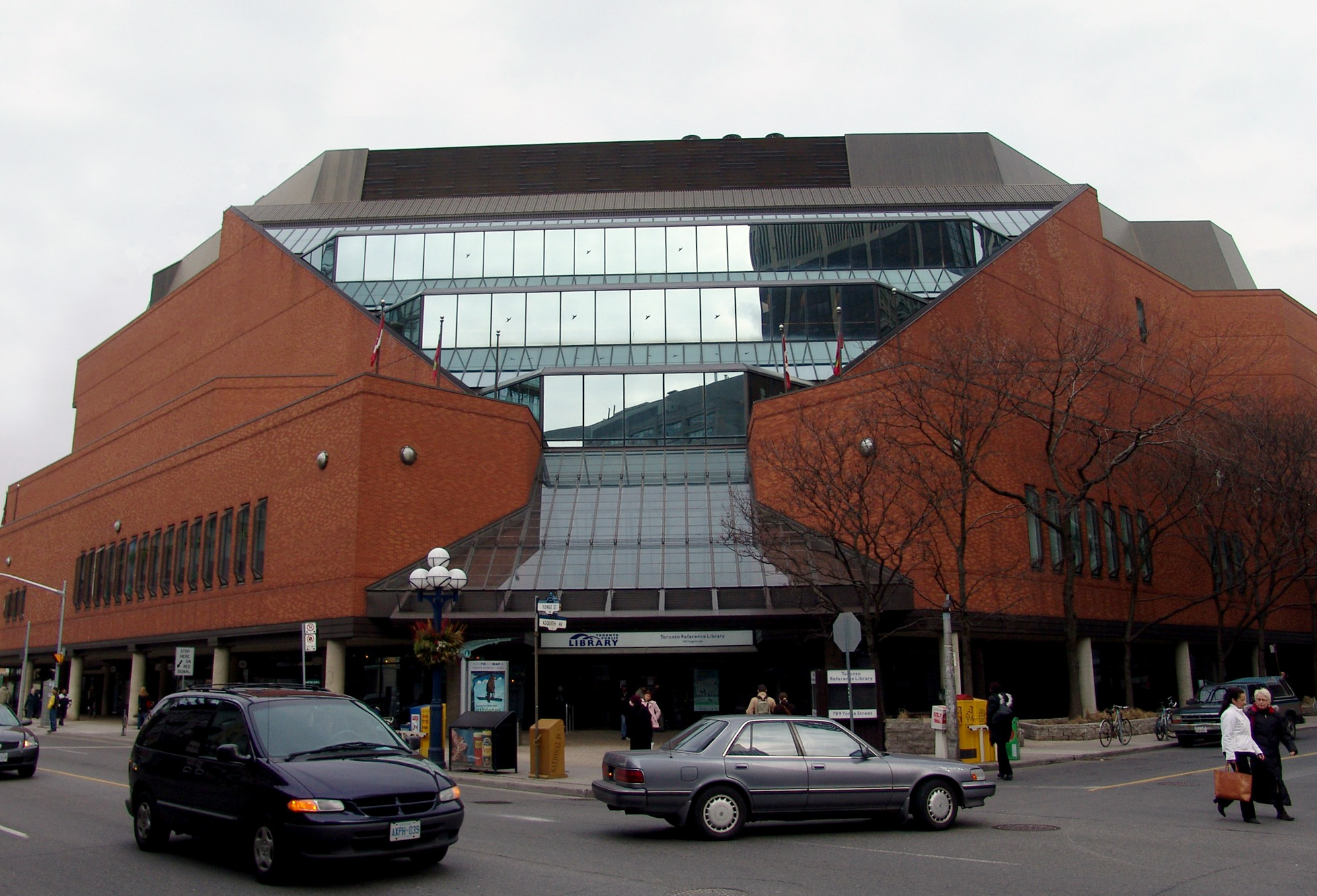
The Toronto Reference Library from Yonge Street and Asquith Avenue in 2006, prior to its 2009–14 renovation and expansion

From 2009 to 2014, the Toronto Reference Library building underwent a C$34 million renovation of its building. The library interior was used as a filming location for Red in 2010. Renovations and expansions to the library during this time includes the Bram and Bluma Appel Salon, and a new glass-cube entrance for the building. The renovations were completed on 19 September 2014. The revitalization efforts saw the library expanded in floor size, and a number of technological innovations incorporated into the library, event spaces created, and the reconfiguration of the library's bookshelves.

The Toronto Comic Arts Festival Store (TCAF) was opened inside the Toronto Reference Library, initially as a pop-up shop in December 2014. In 2015, it became a long-term store on the ground floor of the library, called Page & Panel, but closed in 2022.

== Building ==
The building was designed by Raymond Moriyama Architects in the mid-1970s. At 39,626.4 square metres (426,535 sq ft), the five-double-storey building is the largest TPL branch by area. The building is approximately 36 metres (119 ft) at its highest point. The first level is approximately 78 by 78 metres (255 ft × 255 ft).

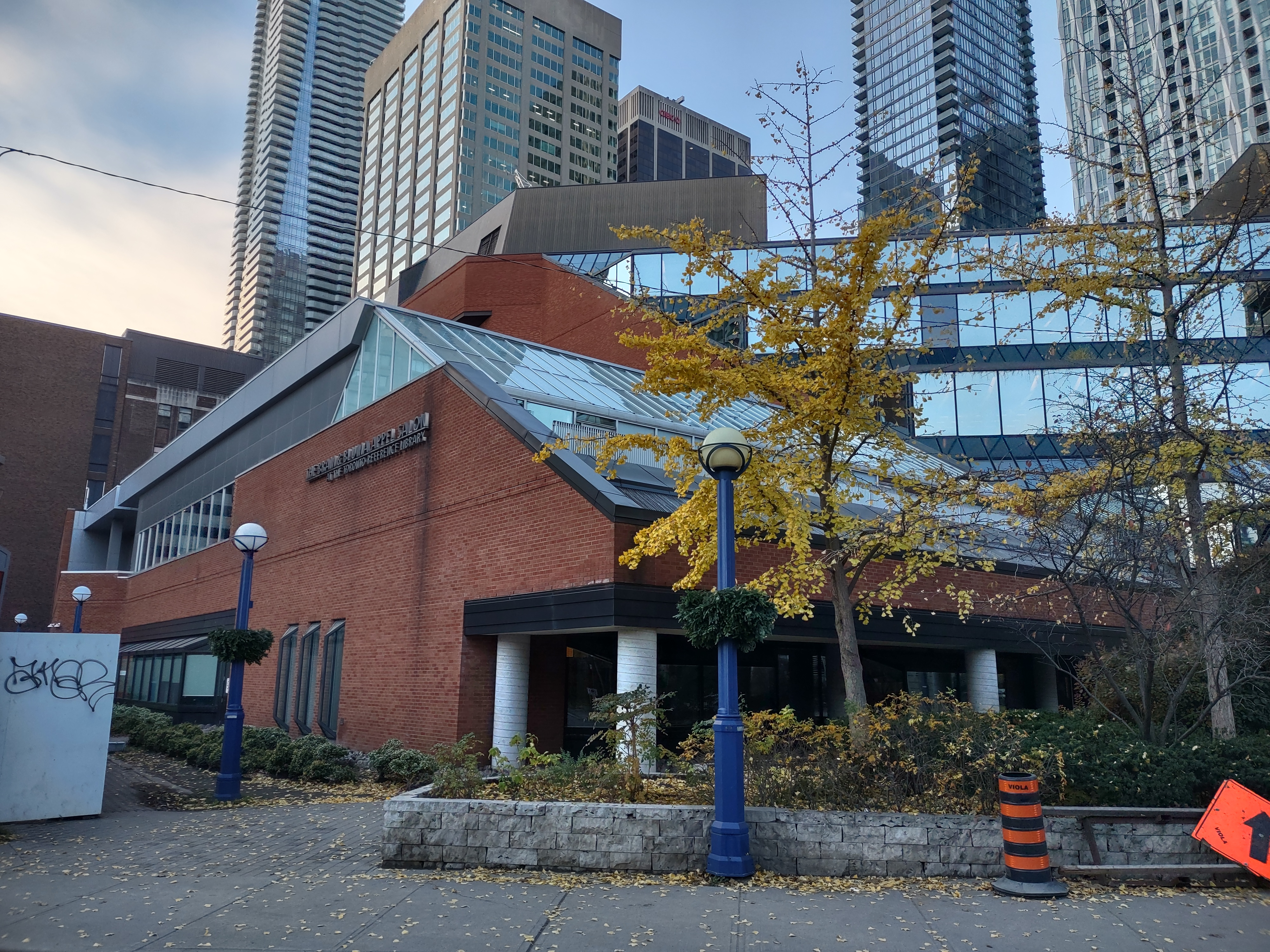
The northeast façade from Church Street, primarily made of orange-reddish brick and glass

The first level of the structure was designed to align in height with adjacent buildings, with the first level being 14-metre-high (45 ft). The other levels of the building are pushed further back into the property, away from the street; forming a pyramid shape to decrease the massing of the building. The building was primarily built out of steel reinforced concrete and is clad with orange-reddish brick to match the building material of the other buildings in the area; although glass portions on the sections of the building facing Yonge Street also exists. Street-friendly programming was incorporated into the design of the entrance to provide a "lively connection" from the sidewalk.

Energy conservation methods were employed in the design of the interior and its HVAC systems. The building climate is regulated through an internal heat pump system that recovers the heat from its lights, visitors, and the solar radiation that passes through the window. The open-space curved central atrium features a skylight and is also designed to allow air to circulate freely. Spread throughout the central atrium are plant and water features, inspired by the Hanging Gardens of Babylon.

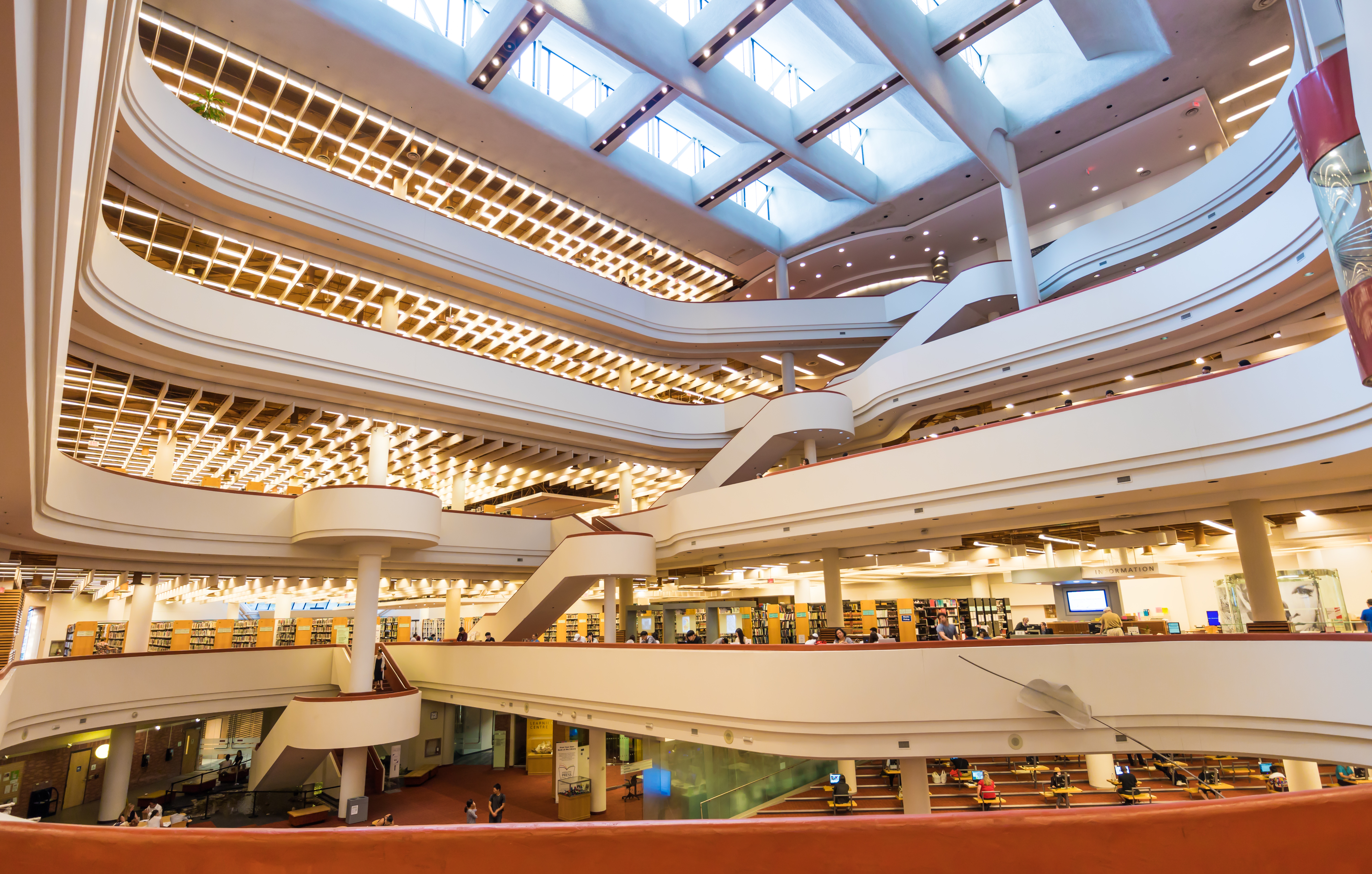
The central atrium and its skylight

Renovations were undertaken from 2009 to 2014, which saw the building expanded to its present size with a transparent glass cube built onto the structure; the glass cube holds an expanded lobby that includes a shop and café. The design of the cube is reminiscent of the original proposal submitted by Moriyama in 1973. Several social spaces were built into the library during the renovations, including an event centre and the special collections rotunda. The revitalization efforts were led by Moriyama & Teshima Architects, the successor architectural firm to Raymond Moriyama Architects.

== Collection ==
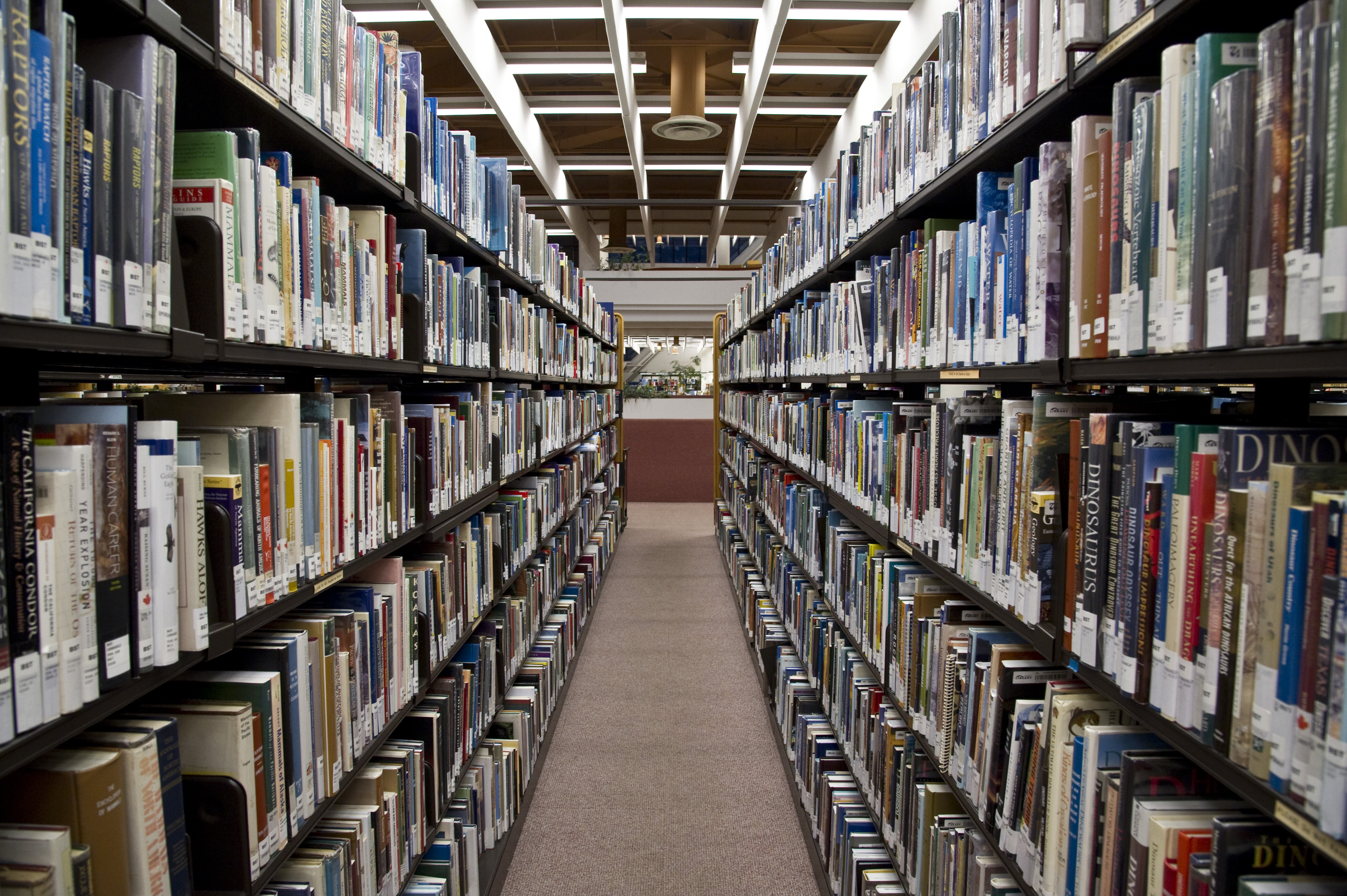
Bookshelves inside the library

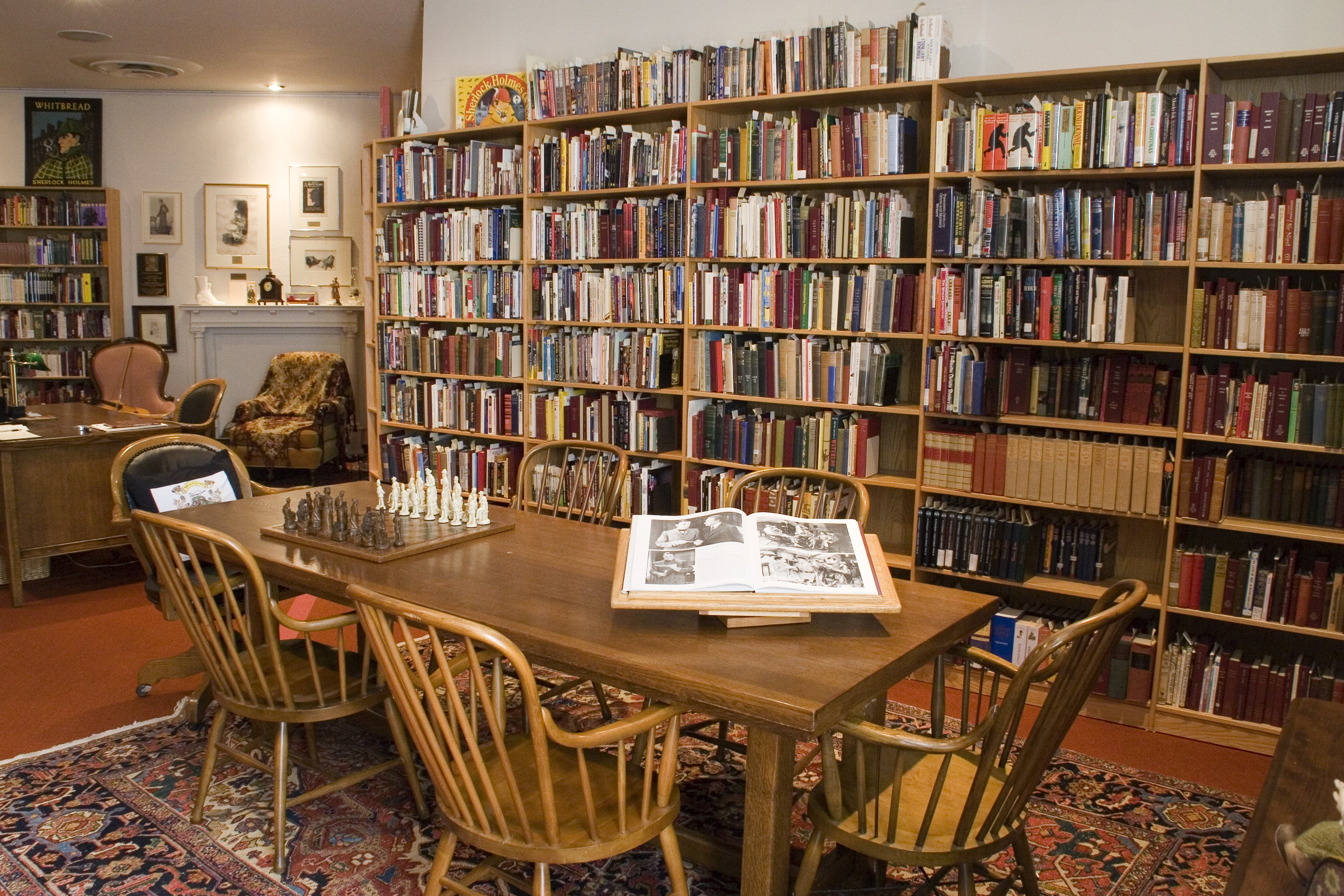
The Holmes' study room holds the library's special collection on Arthur Conan Doyle.

The Toronto Reference Library is the largest public reference library in Canada. Because it operates as a reference library, most items in its collections are non-circulating, with the public unable to borrow most of these items for use outside the library. However, the Toronto Reference Library's collections do include a small number of circulating books, DVDs, and musical scores that may be loaned for outside use to TPL members. In 2018, it saw a circulation of over 375,000.

Items are largely arranged among the levels of the building by discipline and subject. Over 80 kilometres (50 mi) of shelving is used to house the library's collection, with over 1.6 million items on its open shelves. As of March 2016, the library has approximately 15,000 vinyls in its collection.

In addition to its regular collection, the reference library also holds several special collections of the Toronto Public Library, many of which are held at the Marilyn & Charles Baillie Special Collections Centre on the building's fifth level, or the TD Gallery on the building's first level. Over 2 million items are stored in the Marilyn & Charles Bailie Special Collections Centre. The Baldwin Collection of Canadiana is a special collection of primary sources and materials on the history of pre-Confederation Canada. The collection was named after Robert Baldwin, leader of the Reform movement in Upper Canada during the mid-19th century.

Rare book collections held at the library include the Arthur Conan Doyle collection. The items are held in a Victorian-esque room modelled after the study at 221B Baker Street, the home of Doyle's fictional character Sherlock Holmes. The basis of the collection was formed in 1969, after TPL purchased approximately 500 books from the estate of Toronto-based Arthur Vincent Baillie, 200 of which were books about Holmes. The collection has since expanded to include thousands of original manuscripts, photographs of Doyle, as well as translations of his works. The collection had since been supplemented by over 1,500 items from Harold Mortlake based in London, over 200 editions from American collector Nathan L. Bengis, and a number of items from Toronto based S. Tepper Bigelow.

== Operations ==
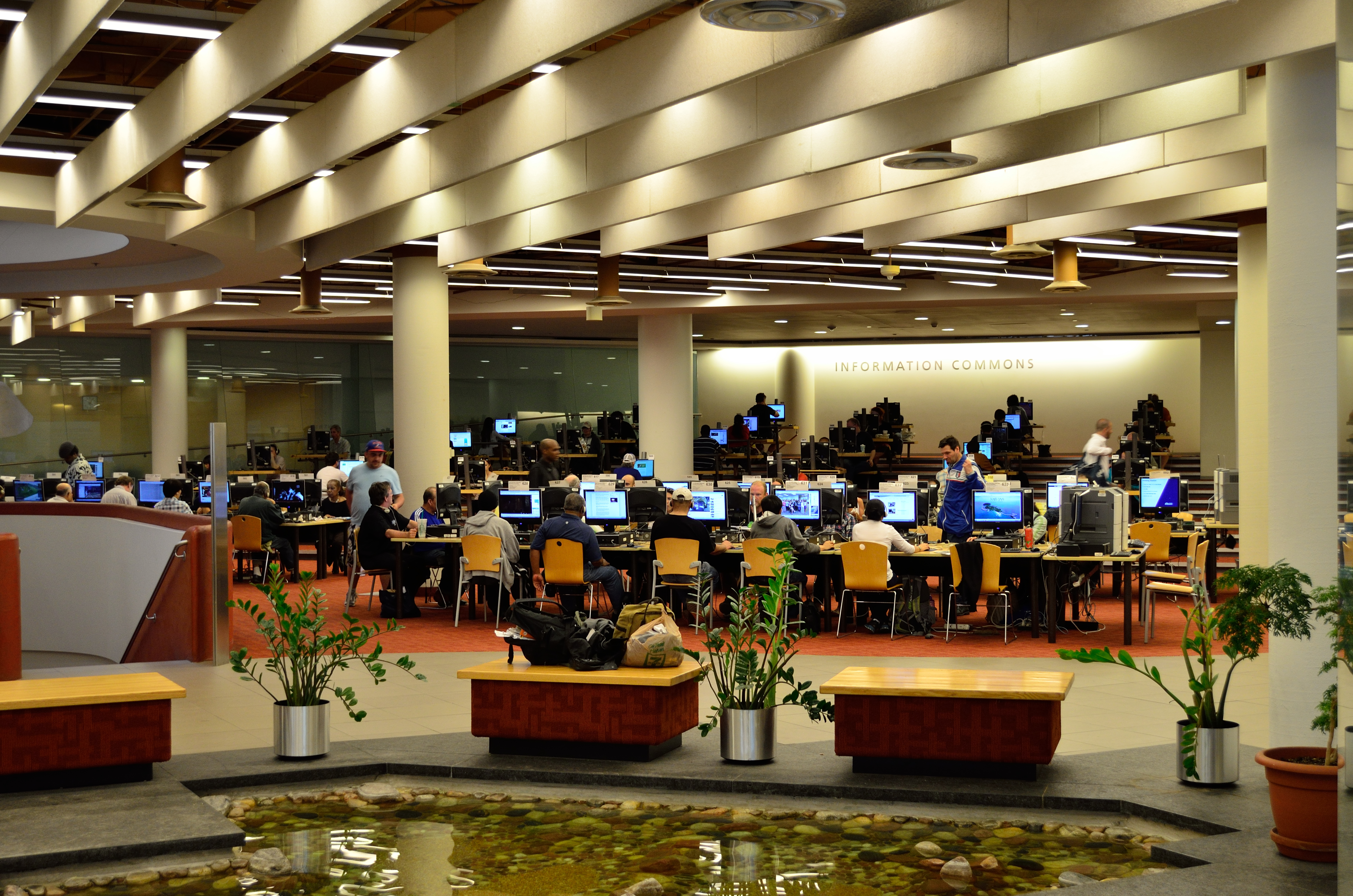
Computers available for use at the Toronto Reference Library

The reference library is the most visited branch of Toronto Public Library, with the Toronto Reference Library averaging more than 1.5 million visitors each year. The library provides members of TPL with access to its collections, event and study rooms, the workstations and computers in the library, and seating; of which there is approximately 1,250 seats available in the Toronto Reference Library.

It addition to access to its collections, the library also provides a number of technical services and facilities to the public. As of June 2018, the library operated three 3D printers available for use for TPL members. The library also has a printing press for self-publishing paperbacks, green screen room for photography and sound/video recording. The reference library also hosts a number of reading events at its 575-seat theatre, free to the public.

== Filming location ==
The Toronto Reference Library has also been the filming location for a number of films and music videos including Red (2010), "Secrets" by the Weeknd, and The L.A. Complex.

== See also ==
- Film Reference Library, another reference library in Toronto
- List of Toronto Public Library branches
