= Murray Koffler =

Canadian pharmacist

- Born: Murray Bernard Koffler; January 22, 1924; Toronto, Ontario, Canada
- Died: November 5, 2017 (aged 93); Toronto, Ontario, Canada
- Resting place: Mount Sinai Memorial Park
- Education: University of Toronto
- Occupations: Pharmacist, businessman, and philanthropist
- Known for: Founder of Shoppers Drug Mart and the Koffler Centre of the Arts
- Spouse: Marvelle Koffler
- Children: Leon Koffler (son); Tiana Koffler Boyman (daughter); Theo Koffler (daughter); Tom Koffler (son); Adam Koffler (son)
- Awards: Order of Canada; Order of Ontario

Murray Bernard Koffler OC OOnt (January 22, 1924 – November 5, 2017) was a Canadian pharmacist, businessman, and philanthropist. He was best known for founding the Canadian pharmacy chain Shoppers Drug Mart, establishing the Koffler Centre of the Arts, co-founding the Toronto Outdoor Art Fair, and as an initial investor, co-founder and partner in Four Seasons Hotels.

== Life and career ==
Born in Toronto, Ontario, to Romanian-born Jewish immigrant parents, Koffler attended Oakwood Collegiate Institute, and then received a Phm. B. degree in 1946 from the University of Toronto.

In 1946, he became a pharmacist at Koffler Drug Stores (established in 1921 by his father and pharmacist Leon Koffler). From 1968 to 1971, he was President of Koffler Stores Ltd. From 1971 to 1986, he was Chairman of Shoppers Drug Mart. He was appointed an Honorary Chairman in 1986.

In 1979, Koffler opened the first Super-Pharm pharmacy, in Herzliya, Israel. Super-Pharm is still owned by the Koffler family, and there are currently 202 locations in Israel.

In addition to his business pursuits, Koffler was a community leader and philanthropist. He received the B'nai B'rith Distinguished Citizen's Award; the Canada Council of Christians and Jews Humanitarian Award; and, with his wife, Dr. Marvelle Koffler, the Israel Cancer Research Fund Humanitarian Award. He served on the board of governors of the Canadian Council of Christians and Jews, as well as those of Mount Sinai Hospital, the United Jewish Welfare Fund, and the Jerusalem Foundation, and is a past chairman of the United Jewish Appeal. In 1979, he was the Toronto Negev Dinner honoree.

Murray and Marvelle established the Koffler Centre of the Arts in 1974. The Koffler and Koffler Gallery present a contemporary cross-disciplinary arts program including the Vine Awards for Canadian Jewish Literature and a diverse range of programs in theatre, literature and visual arts. The Marvelle Koffler Breast Centre and the Murray Koffler Urologic Wellness Centre were both established through their generous philanthropy to the Mount Sinai Hospital.

In 1969, Koffler rallied the pharmaceutical community, among others, to launch a charitable non-profit association with the mandate to prevent substance abuse through health promotion and education impacting children and youth. CODA develops/delivers preventive drug abuse programs to youth aged 12–19 in 104 Canadian school communities which include students/teachers other youth/adults associated with high school and feeder schools, local community groups/social services/community centres/police and other points of community focus including culturally diverse groups/populations.

In 1971, Koffler and two other Jewish community leaders, Albert Latner and Ray Wolfe, purchased the Canadian Jewish News.

Both Kofflers were major supporters of the Weizmann Institute of Science in Israel. Both sat on the institute's board of governors, and Murray was chair of the international board of directors. He was also chairman emeritus of the Canadian Society for the Weizmann Institute. Another of his contributions to the Weizmann Institute was his funding of the Koffler Accelerator—a sophisticated twin-tower instrument for nuclear research.

== Death ==
Koffler died on November 5, 2017, at his home in Toronto. His widow Marvelle Koffler died on January 14, 2020, at the age of 90.

== Honours ==
In 1977, he was made a Member of the Order of Canada "for his many services to his community as businessman, philanthropist and patron of the arts". He was promoted to Officer in 1995. He was awarded the Order of Ontario in 1992.

In 1986, the Retail Council of Canada recognized Koffler's ability in leading the Oshawa Group to outstanding business success. In recognition of this accomplishment he was presented with the Distinguished Canadian Retailer of the Year Award. Koffler was inducted into the Canadian Business Hall of Fame in 1991.

He was also named to the Order of Ontario in 1992 and received an honorary doctorate from the Weizmann Institute of Science in 1976.

The Murray Koffler Urologic Wellness Centre and the Marvelle Koffler Breast Centre at Mount Sinai Hospital in Toronto is named in his honour and his wife's. The Koffler Student Services Centre and the Koffler Institute of Pharmacy Management at the University of Toronto are named in his honour. He donated the land that later became the Koffler Scientific Reserve, University of Toronto's biological research station at Joker's Hill, in King Township, ON.
