= Millie Chen =

Taiwanese-born Canadian artist

- Born: 1962 (age 63–64); Taipei, Taiwan
- Known for: Interdisciplinary Arts
- Awards: Chalmers Fellowship

Millie Chen (born 1962) is a Taiwanese-born Canadian artist, educator, and writer. Based in Buffalo, New York, Chen is a professor in the Department of Art at the University at Buffalo.

== Early life and education ==
She was born in Taipei, Taiwan, and raised in Toronto, Ontario. Chen received an MFA in Studio Arts from Concordia University in 1994 and her BFA Honours from York University in 1986. She studied piano at the Royal Conservatory of Music.

== Career ==
Chen's installations, videos, and interventions have been exhibited across Canada, the United States, Mexico, Brazil, France, the Netherlands, Northern Ireland, Japan and China. Her work is often intended as a sensorial experience that questions the perceptual and ideological assumptions of the audience.

Along with having work in the public collection of the Canada Council Art Bank, Albright-Knox Art Gallery, and Roswell Park's Art Collection, Chen has produced a number of major permanent public art commissions. The Canadian Pacific Railway commissioned a mural in 1998 to commemorate the historic West Toronto Junction Engine House. In 2001 the City of Toronto commissioned Timetrack in Dempsey Park, and the following year commissioned Third Garden at the site of the former Lakeshore Psychiatric Hospital. Both sculptural public art installations were made in collaboration with artist Warren Quigley. The duo had collaborated previously on Gateway in 1997, a pair of allegorical entrances at the intersection of Spadina Avenue and Dundas Street West that identify Toronto’s Chinatown, a work commissioned by the City of Toronto, Toronto Transit Commission, and Toronto Chinatown Development Association.

The site-specific Chinoiserie Room was commissioned by the Gladstone Hotel in 2005. Chinoiserie refers to a style of decorative art based on European imitation of Asian motifs. Chen makes use of this style ironically, poking fun at decorative appropriation and exoticism. The room's effect relies on wallpaper design, which contrasts Victorian imagery with contemporary global references.

Among her numerous awards and grants is a Chalmers Fellowship through the Ontario Arts Council to produce Demon Girl Duet, a dual-screen video installation depicting two river journeys. One follows the Yangtze in China, while another follows the Niagara River, which spans a 35-mile stretch of the border between Canada and the United States. The piece was exhibited in the Canada Pavilion at Shanghai Expo 2010.

As the University of Colorado Art Museum's 2018 Artist-in-Residence, Chen produced the installation entitled Millie Chen: Four Recollections as well as egg MUSEUM, in which egg tempera studies of photographic details are juxtaposed with objects from the Museum's collection. Her concurrent project, Silk Road Singbook--which re-traces a Eurasian trading routes--also focuses on narratives of cultural and generational relationships.

Chen is represented by Anna Kaplan Contemporary.

== Solo exhibitions ==
- Millie Chen: Miseries & Vengeance Wallpapers at Albright-Knox Art Gallery, October 4, 2013 – November 16, 2014
- Millie Chen: Tour at Albright-Knox Art Gallery, January 30 – May 18, 2014
- Millie Chen: stain at BT&C Gallery, February 5 – March 27, 2015
- Millie Chen: Tour at Vtape, September 11 – October 15, 2015
- Millie Chen: Prototypes 1970s at BT&C Gallery, November 3 – December 17, 2016
- Millie Chen: Four Recollections at CU Art Museum, February 1 – July 21, 2018
- Millie Chen: Matter at Anna Kaplan Contemporary, February 21 – April 5, 2019
