= Yair Dalal =

Israeli musician of Iraqi-Jewish descent

Yair Dalal יאיר דלאל
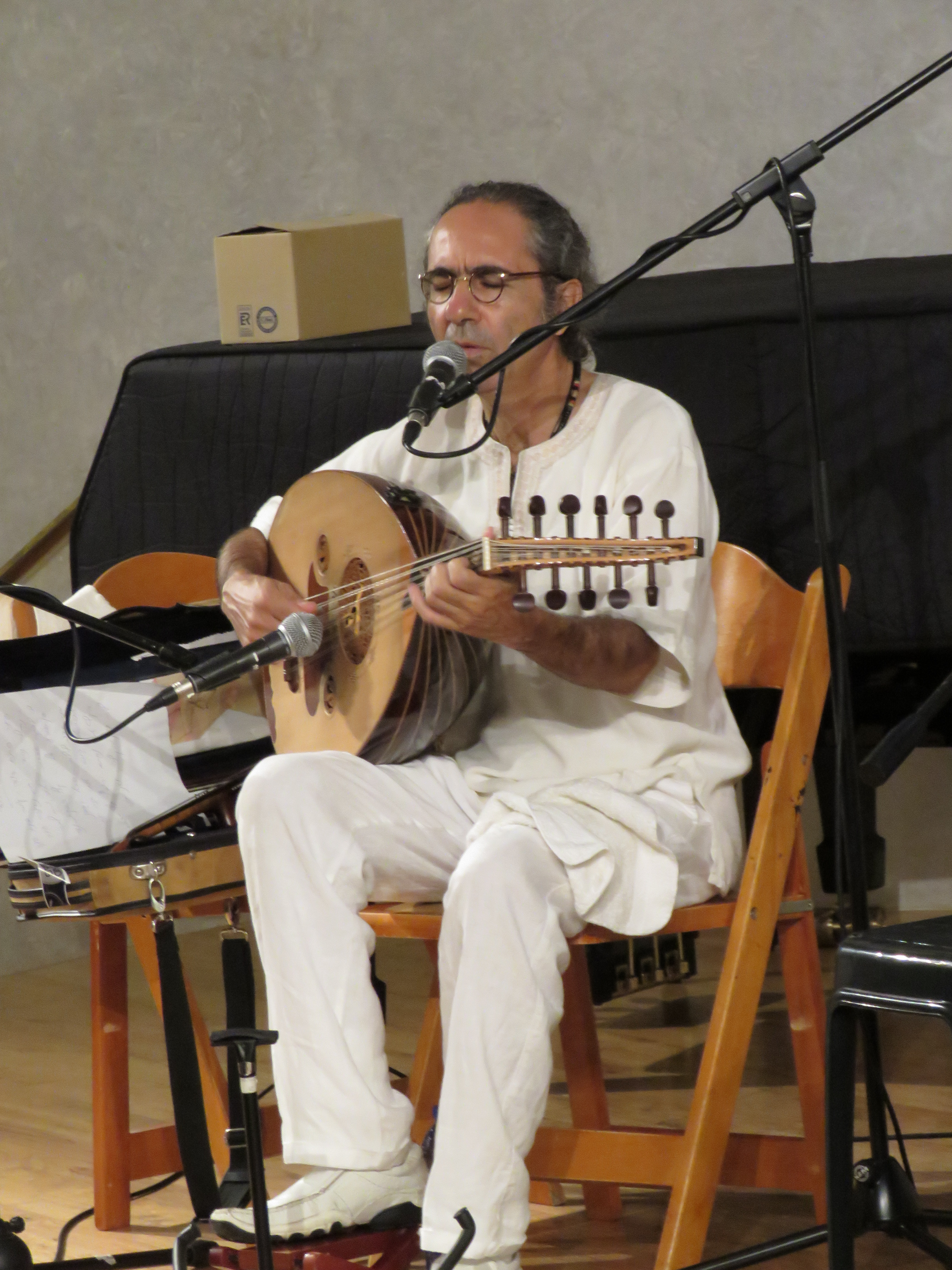

Background information
- Born: July 25, 1955 (age 71); Israel
- Occupations: Singer, instrumentalist
- Instruments: Oud, violin
- Website: www.yairdalal.com

Yair Dalal (Hebrew: יאיר דלאל; born 25 July 1955) is an Israeli musician of Iraqi-Jewish descent.

His main instruments are the oud and the violin, and he also sings as accompaniment. He composes his own music and draws on Arab and Jewish traditions, as well as European classical music and Indian music. He is also a peace activist, and works to enhance understanding and communication between Arabs and Jews.

== Biography and musical style ==
Yair Dalal was born in Israel in 1955, his parents were Jews and they had immigrated to Israel the year before. Growing up, he was exposed to many different kinds of music, and studied violin at Givatayim Conservatory, just east of Tel Aviv. Though he was influenced by Iraqi folk music, he was also interested in Western rock. In his early twenties, he started to play the oud. In his thirties, he lived on Kibbutz Samar, Israel, on the southern tip of the Arabah Desert, and played music with the Bedouin tribe Azazme. His experience playing music with Bedouin tribes helped him find the musical identity he has today, and inspired him to write music that bridges the gap between Jewish Israelis and Arabs. His musical style is now influenced by European classical, jazz, blues and Arab music. He describes it as, “It is Arabic, it is Iraqi, it is Jewish and Israeli.” Performing in recent years he often wears a loose white robe or long jacket, with a cloth draped over his shoulder like a prayer shawl which he says shows his heritage and spirituality without being orthodox or overly religious. He also believes in the emotional and transformative power of music.

During the first Gulf War, he composed a piece with his then band, called Midian. The piece has a violin part which imitated the sound of Scud missiles falling from Iraq to Israel. After that, he began touring and recording both as a solo artist and with his band, Al Ol. Between 1995 and 2002, he recorded seven solo albums. In 1994, he wrote the song “Zaman el Salaam” and performed it during the Nobel Peace Prize ceremony for Yitzhak Rabin, Shimon Peres, and Yasser Arafat.

== Activism and cultural heritage ==
Among his many efforts to promote peace between Arabs and Israelis, Dalal has created a “Concert for Peace,” and written an album entitled “Inshallah Shalom,” which loosely translates to “God willing there shall be peace.” He has toured with a band of Palestinian musicians, but when the second intifada started, they were forbidden to travel together. The album they recorded features a cover of The Beatles "We Can Work It Out". He also believes strongly in his passion for playing the oud. He curated the 2001 Oud Festival in Jerusalem, and says, “Oud music is a bonding factor... this is the music which Jews and Arabs grew up on together.”

Dalal has also made many efforts to preserve the cultural heritage of Arab-Israeli music. He has been involved with the publication of archival recordings from Middle Eastern Jewish musicians who were popular in the 1950s, in an effort to preserve the genre. He also teaches workshops and advocates for education to bring various types of music to wider audiences. He feels a strong connection to the Bedouins and the desert itself, and attempts to promote the connection between the ancient desert people and modern Israelis and Palestinians.

As for his influences in music, he says, “When I play or when I compose, many things are in my head and in my spirit: the Jewish prayer from the Synagogue, the Iraqi maqam which was played in the Baghdad coffee shops by the Jews, and the folk songs that we have in Arabic. And also the desert, which is my favorite place.”

== Additional bibliography ==
- Cooper, A. (2006). The 'Forgotten Refugees' remembered in film. Judaism: A Quarterly Journal of Jewish Life and Thought. 55.(1-2), 121-123.
- Danielson, V., Marcus, S., Reynolds, D. (2002). Garland Encyclopedia of World Music: The Middle East (1011-1077). New York: Routledge.
- Nickson, C. (2004). The NPR Curious Listener’s Guide to World Music. New York: Berkeley Publishing Group.
- Stanley, S. (2001). The New Grove Dictionary of Music and Musicians. New York: Grove’s Dictionaries.
