= Ashkenaz Foundation =

The Ashkenaz Foundation is a non-profit organization based in Toronto, Ontario, Canada. Its purpose is to increase awareness of Yiddish and Jewish culture through the arts. The foundation organizes and sponsors a biennial festival, and has a year-round programme which showcases the work of contemporary artists from Canada and around the world, with a particular focus on music.

== History ==
The Ashkenaz Foundation was founded in 1995, with a mandate to promote Klezmer, Yiddish and east European Jewish cultural arts, as well as other manifestations of global Jewish music and culture, including Israeli, Sephardic, Ladino, and Mizrahi Jewish traditions. That year the foundation organized the first Ashkenaz Festival.

Ashkenaz has sponsored fusion and cross-cultural exchange with artists from outside Jewish cultural traditions through commissioned works and special projects. Ashkenaz promotes local and emerging talent, and takes part in education and community outreach. Most Ashkenaz presentations are presented free to the public.

== Ashkenaz Festival ==
The Ashkenaz Festival The Festival takes place biennially at Toronto's Harbourfront Centre and satellite locations throughout Toronto. Each edition showcases approximately 50-75 acts from Canada and around the world, and includes music, theatre, dance, film, literature, craft, and visual arts. The Festival draws an audience of about 60,000 people and has grown to be the largest Jewish cultural event in Canada.

The first Ashkenaz Festival took place in July 1995, and was focused on Klezmer and Yiddish There were Festival editions in 1995, 1997, 1999, 2002, 2004, 2006, 2008, 2010, 2012, 2014, 2016 and 2018. The 7th Ashkenaz Festival in August 2008 celebrated the organization's "Bar Mitzvah" year (13th year). The August 2014 iteration celebrated the 20th anniversary of the Foundation, and the 10th biennial Festival. Over time the festival has expanded to include many genres of world music. The 2020 Ashkenaz Festival would have marked the organization's 25th year, but was cancelled due to COVID-19.

In 2016 the festival's artistic director is Eric Stein.
