= Koffler Student Services Centre =

Building at the University of Toronto St. George

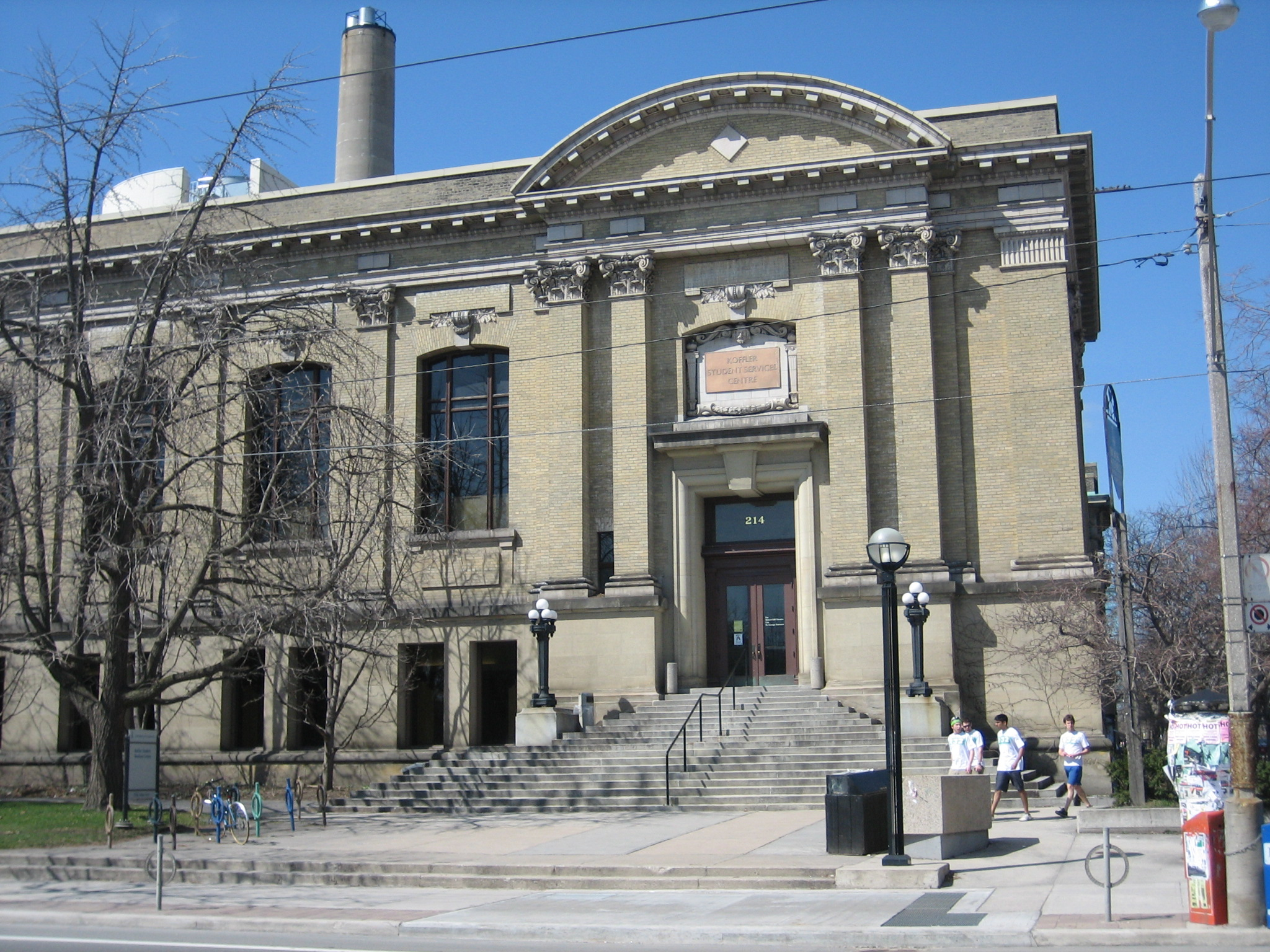
- Interactive map of the Koffler Student Services Centre area

General information
- Architectural style: Beaux Arts
- Location: 214 College Street, Toronto, Ontario, Canada
- Coordinates: 43°39′33″N 79°23′49″W
- Named for: Murray Koffler
- Opened: 1909; 117 years ago
- Owner: University of Toronto

Design and construction
- Architect: Alfred H. Chapman

Other information
- Public transit: 506

Ontario Heritage Act
- Criteria: Designated Part IV
- Designated: Nov 26, 1975

The Koffler Student Services Centre is a building of the University of Toronto on its St. George campus, located at 214 College Street, Toronto. The centre houses a number of different student services, including the St. George location of the University of Toronto Bookstore, Career Centre, and health clinic. The ornate building is located at the northwest corner of St. George and College streets in a building that was formerly the home of the Toronto Reference Library.

== History ==
The building was opened in 1909 as the Toronto Public Library's Central Reference Library, Ontario's largest Carnegie library. It remained the home of the reference library until 1977, when it relocated to its current home at Bloor and Yonge.

The building was then acquired by the University of Toronto, converted into the student services centre, and renamed after university supporter Murray Koffler of Shoppers Drug Mart.

== Architecture ==
Designed by Alfred H. Chapman, the Beaux Arts building features a grand entrance fronting College Street by St. George Street, with stairs rising to the former library's piano nobile. A second, less prominent ground level entrance, located towards the western part of the College Street façade, balances the composition. This main façade fronting College Street is characterized by a sequence of lower paired windows set in a smooth grey stone wall. Its contrasting yellow brick upper section features six two-storey windows set between Corinthian columns.

The original library's reading and reference room overlooked College Street through the large front windows. An addition by Chapman and Oxley in association with Wickson and Gregg was completed along St. George Street in 1930, the theatre was renovated in 1961 by Irving Grossman, and 1985 marked the renovation and restoration of the building headed by Howard D. Chapman (son of Alfred H. Chapman) and Howard V. Walker.

The building was listed a heritage structure in Toronto's inventory of heritage properties in 1973.
