= Chapman and Oxley =

Canadian architectural firm

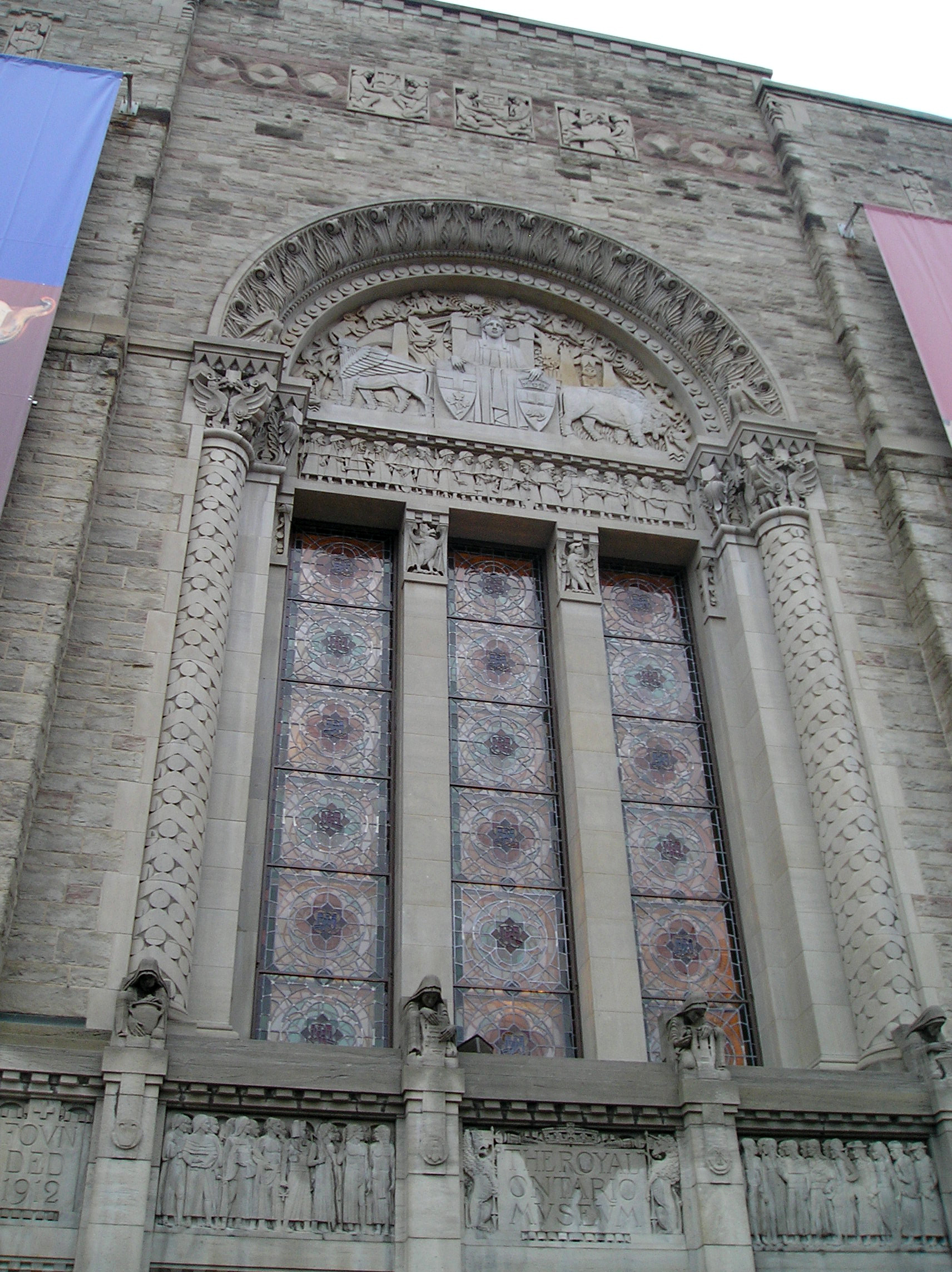
The Royal Ontario Museum

Chapman and Oxley was a Toronto-based architectural firm that was responsible for designing a number of prominent buildings in the city during the 1920s and 1930s. Even with the departure of Chapman, the firm's last projects appeared to be in the late 1940s.

== History ==
The firm was founded in 1919 by architects Alfred Hirschfelder Chapman (1875-1949) and James Morrow Oxley (1883-1957).

A.H. Chapman was born in Toronto to the Chapman family, owners of Grenadier Ice Company at Grenadier Pond (in what is now High Park) and Belle Ewart Ice Company (later as Chapmans Limited). Chapman apprenticed under architect Beaumont Jarvis (1864-1948). He then went to study architecture in Paris. From 1920 he was head of the family business, Chapmans Limited, which sold ice and fuel in Toronto. Chapman served as president of the Ontario Association of Architects for two consecutive periods, 1929 and 1930. Chapman retired in 1943 and died in 1949. He is buried at St. George's Church (Anglican) and Cemetery (Susan Sibbald Memorial Stone Church) in Sutton, Ontario.

Chapman's son Howard Dennison Chapman (1917-2014), also an architect, formed his own firm, Chapman and Hurst, and worked with Howard V. Walker on a number of buildings, such as the Riverdale Hospital, and on restoration projects in the 1980s (Koffler Student Centre, built by his father Alfred H. Chapman as Central Reference Library). Another son, Christopher Chapman (1927-2015), was a writer, director and cinematographer. His multi-award-winning documentary, "A Place to Stand", was nominated for two Oscars, winning one; Christopher's twin brother Francis Chapman (1927-2020) was also a noted filmmaker.

J.M. Oxley attended the University of Toronto as an engineering (applied sciences) student. He fought in World War I in the Canadian Expeditionary Force from 1915 to 1918. Oxley was also president of the Mississaugua Golf & Country Club from 1939 to 1940. He died in 1957.

== Projects ==
A list of projects worked on by Chapman and Oxley:

| Building | Year | Type | Notes |
|---|---|---|---|
| Toronto Harbour Commission Building | 1919 | Office building | Successor agency PortsToronto no longer is located in building |
| Sunnyside Bathing Pavilion | 1922 | Public pool | Still in operation |
| Palais Royale | 1922 | Dancehall | Built with Bishop; still in use as special events hall |
| 330 Bay Street | 1925 | 16 storey office tower | Now named as Northern Ontario Building |
| CNE Ontario Government Building | 1925-1926 | Exhibition Hall | Now houses Liberty Grand banquet and ballroom facility |
| Havergal College | 1926 | School | Still in operation |
| Maple Leaf Stadium | 1926 | Baseball stadium | Demolished 1968 and replaced with apartment buildings and gas station |
| National Building | 1926 | 12 storey office building | Demolished in 2009 to make way for Bay Adelaide Centre |
| Crosse and Blackwell Building | 1927 | Television station | Later as CFMT Building and now simply as 545 Lakeshore Boulevard West |
| Princes' Gates, at Exhibition Place | 1927 | Arch gateway | |
| Dominion Building (Toronto) | 1927 | 12 storey office tower | Home to National Cash Register; later as City Hall Annex (City of Toronto government) and Ryerson Polytechnical Institute (now Toronto Metropolitan University); demolished 1977 after fire damaged the structure |
| Runnymede Theatre, Toronto | 1927 | Double screen atmospheric theatre | Closed 1998 and converted to Chapter's bookstore; bookstore closed in 2013 and became Shoppers Drug Mart in 2014. |
| Capitol Theatre, Cornwall, Ontario | 1928 | Single screen atmospheric theatre | Inner theatre designed by architect G.J. Mace; closed 1985 and demolished 1991 |
| Old Toronto Star Building | 1929 | Office building | Demolished 1970 and now site of First Canadian Place |
| Sterling Tower | 1929 | 21 storey office tower | Added to Toronto Heritage site in 1976 |
| The Bay's Queen Street location | 1929 | 9 storey department store addition | Houses the Arcadian Court and Robert Simpson Complex at the rear |
| Toronto Public Library Circulating Library | 1930 | Library | Now Koffler Student Centre, University of Toronto |
| A. Wander Company Ltd. | 1930-1931 | Factory in Peterborough, ON | Demolished in 2019 |
| Toronto Hydro Building (Carlton Street) | 1931 | Office building | With associate Albert E. Salisbury |
| Royal Ontario Museum | 1933 | Expansion wing | Mix of neo-Byzantine and Art Deco |
| Holy Blossom Temple | 1938 | Synagogue | |
| O'Keefe Building | 1938-1939 | Office building | Built as head office for E. P. Taylor's Canadian Breweries Limited, then purchased by Ryerson Polytechnical Institute (now Toronto Metropolitan University) as a home for radio station CJRT and now home to the Chang School of Continuing Education |
| Bank of Montreal Building at King and Bay | 1948 | Bank building | Demolished 1972 (along with Old Toronto Star Building) for First Canadian Place |

A list of work by Chapman or Oxley prior to the founding of their firm in 1919:

| Building | Year | Type | Architects | Notes |
|---|---|---|---|---|
| Old Oakville Grammar School (291 Reynolds Street) | 1908 | School | Chapman | Later as Oakville Trafalgar High School (1946) and closed in 1993; 1942 and 1960s additions demolished after being acquired by Oakville-Trafalgar Memorial Hospital |
| Toronto Public Library Bloor-Gladstone Branch | 1911-1913 | library | Alfred H. Chapman & Robert B. McGiffin; | Renovated by Howard D Chapman 1975 |
| Toronto Reference Library - St. George Street | 1909 | Library | Wickson & Gregg and A.H. Chapman | Now Koffler Student Centre, University of Toronto |
| Carnegie Library - Dundas, Ontario | 1909 | Library | Chapman and McGiffin | Now Carnegie Gallery |
| Rosedale Presbyterian Church, Toronto | 1909 | Church | Chapman and McGiffin | Christian Education building added 1955 |
| Knox College (University of Toronto) | 1912-15 | University building | Chapman and McGiffin | |
| Toronto Public Library Dovercourt Branch | 1913 | Library | Chapman and McGiffin | |
| Carnegie Library - Barrie, Ontario | 1915 | Library | Chapman and McGiffin | Now MacLaren Arts Centre |

== See also ==
List of other Toronto architectural firms:

- Bregman + Hamann Architects
- Darling and Pearson
- WZMH Architects
