= University of the Air =

University of the Air may refer to:

- University of the Air (TV series) (1966–1983), a Canadian educational television series
- University of the Air (CBC radio series) (1960s), a Canadian Broadcasting Corporation radio educational programme
- University of the Air, a radio program from the University of Wisconsin–Madison airing on Wisconsin Public Radio
- University of the Air, the former name of the Japanese distance learning university now known as the Open University of Japan
- NBC University of the Air (1920s–1940s), a network radio series in the United States
