= Ryerson Radio =

Ryerson Radio may refer to one of several radio broadcasting efforts based at Toronto Metropolitan University (previously Ryerson University) since 1948:

- CJRT-FM, was owned by what was then the Ryerson Institute of Technology from 1949 until 1974 when it became publicly owned. The station became professionally staffed in 1964. Its programming included accredited Open College on-air university courses from 1971 until 2003. Its studios were on Ryerson's campus until 2006.
- Ryerson Community Radio was a closed-circuit radio station operated on campus. Founded in 1970 which continued into the early 1980s when it evolved into CKLN-FM. The station adopted the call letters CRFM in 1972 and then CKLN in 1978.
- CKLN-FM was a campus-based community radio station broadcasting over the air on 88.1 FM from 1983 until its license was revoked in 2011.
- CJTM 1280, (formerly CJRU) is an AM radio station that was first launched on the internet by Ryerson Radio Inc. in 2013. It was awarded an AM broadcast license by the CRTC in late 2014 and began broadcasting over the air on 1280 AM on March 31, 2016.
- SpiritLive is an internet radio station operated by the university's RTA School of Media and programmed by RTA students.
