= Sterling Tower =

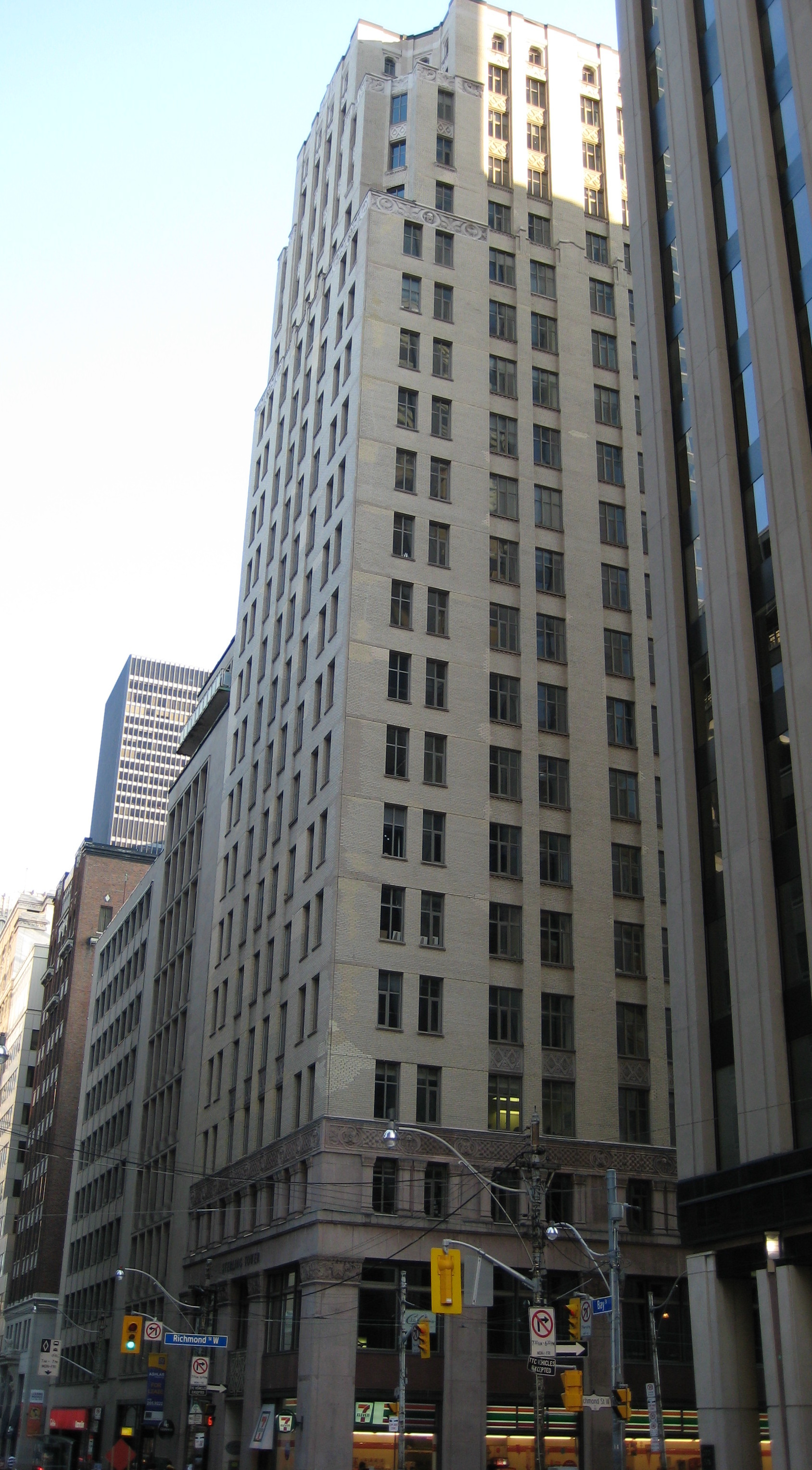
- Interactive map of the Sterling Tower area

General information
- Type: Commercial offices
- Location: Toronto, Ontario, Canada
- Coordinates: 43.650973°N 79.381612°W
- Completed: 1928

Height
- Roof: c.100 m (330 ft)

Technical details
- Floor count: 21
- Lifts/elevators: 4

Design and construction
- Architect: Chapman and Oxley
- Structural engineer: Yolles Group

Sterling Tower is a twenty one storey art deco skyscraper at 372 Bay Street at Richmond Street in Toronto, Ontario, Canada.

== Overview ==
Designed by Chapman and Oxley, and completed in 1928, the building was the tallest in the city for one year, until the construction of the Royal York Hotel. Henry Falk, a New York entrepreneur, was the builder responsible for Sterling Tower's construction along with local firm Yolles & Rotenberg. The Sterling Tower was part of Toronto's late 1920s building boom.

== Recognition ==
On 18 August 1976, Sterling Tower was adopted by the City Council of Toronto as an architectural/contextual Heritage Property.
