= 545 Lake Shore Boulevard West =

Building in Toronto, Canada

Coordinates: 43.636417°N 79.39899°W

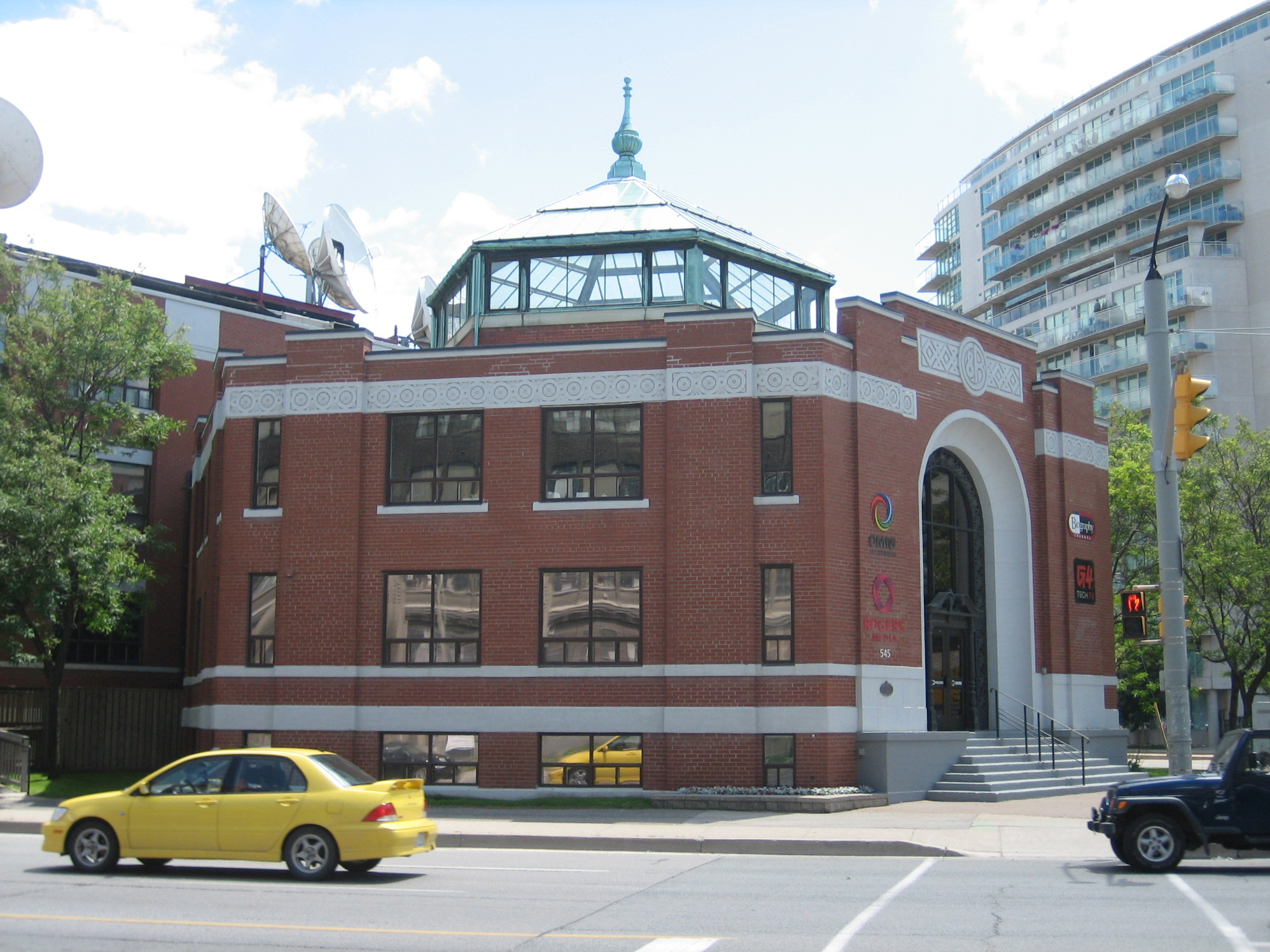
545 Lake Shore Boulevard West

545 Lake Shore Boulevard West is a former media studio complex located along the harbourfront of Toronto, Ontario, Canada, at the intersection of Bathurst Street and Lake Shore Boulevard West.

The Art Deco building was designed by Toronto architects Chapman and Oxley, and was completed in 1927 as the Crosse and Blackwell Building for its namesake food products manufacturer. It has been listed as a heritage property by the City of Toronto's Heritage Preservation Services since 1973, and following restoration became the CFMT Building in 1979 to house Toronto multicultural television station CFMT-TV; it was joined by sister station CJMT-TV upon its launch in 2002. The two stations (now part of Omni Television under Rogers Media) moved to a new studio location at Yonge-Dundas Square (now Sankofa Square) (33 Dundas Street East) on October 19, 2009, although the Omni Television signage remained until August 2018 on the building.

It was also the original home for YTV when the service began its operations on September 1, 1988, with YTV moving out of the building, to 64 Jefferson Avenue, in the overnight hours between November 27 and 28, 1990.

Until recently the building housed the offices and on-air operations for Rogers Media. The building has never housed the main studios of Citytv Toronto, despite featuring Citytv signage on its exterior, but did house the master controls for the station.

Sportsnet is based at the Rogers Building located at Jarvis Street and Bloor Street, where most of the Rogers-owned operations such as its other Toronto radio stations are based. The Shopping Channel is also based at a separate studio in Mississauga.

On April 13, 2017, it was announced that Rogers had sold the property to developer Canderel.
