= Dineen Building =

Historic building in Toronto, Canada

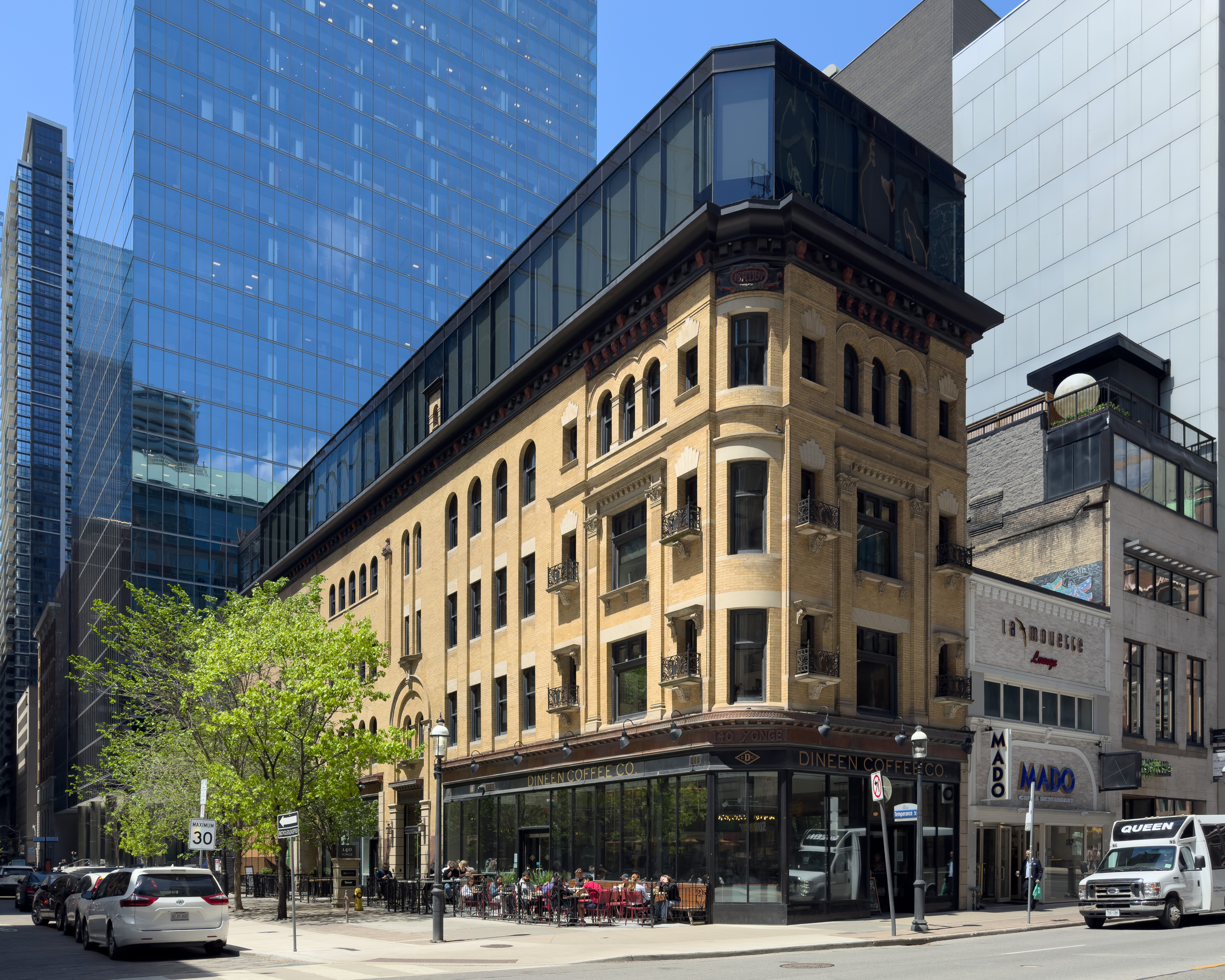

General information
- Architectural style: Renaissance Revival
- Location: 140 Yonge Street, Toronto, Canada
- Coordinates: 43°39′04″N 79°22′45″W
- Completed: 1897
- Renovated: 2012
- Cost: $30,000
- Owner: Commercial Realty Group

Website
- http://commergroup.com/properties/140-yonge/

The Dineen Building is a registered heritage property on Yonge Street, at the corner of Temperance Street, in downtown Toronto, Ontario, Canada. The building was built in 1897, and was extensively renovated in 2012.

== History ==
On November 21, 1973, the City of Toronto listed the property on the City of Toronto Heritage Property Inventory. and designated it as being of cultural heritage value or interest, under Part IV of the Ontario Heritage Act by City of Toronto By-law No.1062-2009, enacted by City Council on November 25, 2009.

The original architect was F. H. Herbert. The building cost $30,000. The building used bronze and aluminum plates on its ceilings—aluminum being used for the first time in Canada. According to the Daily Mail and Empire the building's Sprague automatic elevator was also a remarkable feature.

A Sprague automatic elevator is also a feature not to be found in any store in Canada, this being the first time one has been placed in any building outside of New York State.

A fire triggered by an electrical fault caused significant damage in 1917.

The new owner, Commercial Realty Group, decided to employ the more expensive adaptive reuse method to restoring the building.

The storefront on Yonge Street has had its fifteen foot ceilings re-exposed, and houses a boutique style coffee shop called the Dineen Coffee Co. Two restaurants, "The Chase" and "The Chase Fish and Oyster", has opened on the Temperance Street facade.
