= Black Creek Investment Management Inc. =

Portfolio management firm

- Type: Private
- Industry: Mutual fund
- Founded: 2004
- Headquarters: Toronto, Ontario, Canada
- Key people: Bill Kanko CEO; Richard Jenkins, Chairman
- Total assets: ▲$4.2 Billion CAD (2013)
- Website: www.bcim.ca

Black Creek Investment Management Inc. (BCIM) is a portfolio management firm that specializes in global equity. Each portfolio holds a concentrated position of 25-35 names. The firm also sub-advises on retail mutual funds offered by CI Financial in Canada.

Black Creek is a privately owned company located in Toronto (Ontario, Canada), founded in 2004 by Bill Kanko after leaving his position as Senior Vice President with AIM Trimark. In October 2017, Black Creek Investment Management Inc.purchased 4,889,079 Shares of ICICI Bank Limited (IBN).
