= Open College (Toronto) =

Radio-basdd university-credit distance education provider based in Toronto, Canada

Open College was a radio-based university-credit distance education provider based in Toronto, Canada; it primarily served listeners in Ontario.

Founded in 1971, the courses were accredited by Toronto Metropolitan University (then known as Ryerson Polytechnic Institute) and York University's Atkinson College and broadcast throughout Toronto and much of southern Ontario on what was then Ryerson-owned radio station CJRT which produced and administered the courses.

The service was conceived of by the Dean of Arts of Ryerson Polytechnic Institute who was inspired by the creation of Open University in the United Kingdom, which used radio and television to broadcast some of its credit courses. In 1969, CJRT began broadcasting a non-credit education series which led to the development of credit courses two years later. Ryerson sociology professor Margaret Norquay volunteered for the project and produced its first course, Introduction to Sociology, which commenced in January 1971. Norquay went on to become Open College's first director in 1972.

In 1974, the Ryerson Polytechnical Institute divested itself of CJRT and the radio station became an independent government funded corporation with Open College as one of its departments. The service used the name "Open College" due to its open admissions policy.

At its peak, Open College offered 28 credit courses, produced at the radio station and accredited by Ryerson and Atkinson College. An estimated 15,000 students took courses using the service during its existence with student enrollment peaking in 1995. By the 1980s, Open College broadcasts were heard throughout Ontario as CJRT was added to the FM services offered by cable systems throughout the province. Alberta's public radio broadcaster, CKUA, purchased and broadcast several Open College courses which were broadcast in conjunction with credit courses at Athabasca University; CKUA has continued to develop educational broadcasts in conjunction with Athabasca.

In 1999, the administration of Open College was transferred to Ryerson. In 2003, as a result in the development of the internet as a mode of transmission for distance education and the resulting decline of interest in taking radio courses, as well as CJRT's transformation into an all-jazz radio station, radio broadcasts ended and the service was transferred to Ryerson's Chang School of Continuing Education which now offers distance education through the internet instead of by radio. In its last years, Open College broadcasts were aired Sunday mornings from 6am to 8am.

== See also ==
- CKUA, Alberta's public radio station and Canada's first educational radio broadcaster, originally affiliated with the University of Alberta, now collaborating with Athabasca University.
- TV Ontario, Ontario's educational television broadcaster, which has aired high school credit courses in conjunction with the Independent Learning Centre and post-secondary courses in conjunction with various colleges and universities.
- CKMO in Victoria, aired credit courses in conjunction with Camosun College.
- University of the Air (TV series) (1966–1983), a Canadian educational television series featuring lectures delivered by university professors.
- University of the Air (CBC radio series) (1960s), a CBC Radio educational programme in the 1960s.
