= List of Regent Park community groups =

There are a variety of community groups in the neighbourhood of Regent Park, Toronto, Ontario, which have been highly active in promoting a positive sense of community and community representation, and in pursuing a higher quality of life.

- 416 Community Support for Women - Case Management Services
- ArtHeart Community Art Centre
- Centre Communautaire Africains Francophones
- The Children's Book Bank Canada
- Parents For Better Beginnings
- Regent Park Community Health Centre
- Regent Park Community Centre
- Regent Park Bangladesh Community Association
- Regent Park Khaddim Committee
- Regent Park Women and Families
- Regent Park Focus Youth Media Arts Centre
- Regent Park Film Festival
- Regent Park Community Food Centre
- Regent Park Youth Council
- Regent Park African Women's Group
- The Salvation Army Corps 614
- South East Asian Services
- Toronto Council Fire Native Cultural Centre
- The Umar Bin Khattab Mosque
- W.A.T.C.H (Words, Action, Thought, Character and Heart) - UofT Community Service Club working to transform RP
- Toronto Christian Resource Center
- Regent Park Community Health Center
- Yonge Street Mission
- Dixon Hall
- South East Asian Service Center
- Lead2Peace
