= CHOQ-FM =

Franco-Ontarian community radio station in Toronto

CHOQFM 105.1
- Toronto, Ontario; Canada
- Frequency: 105.1 MHz
- Branding: The French Vibe of Toronto

Programming
- Format: Franco-Ontarian community radio
- Affiliations: Toronto Maple Leafs, Toronto Argonauts

Ownership
- Owner: Cooperative Radio-Toronto

History
- Founded: 1991
- First air date: May 1, 2006

Technical information
- Licensing authority: CRTC
- Class: A
- ERP: 1 kW

Links
- Website: www.choqfm.ca

CHOQ-FM is a Canadian radio station which began broadcasting in 2006. A non-profit community radio station for Franco-Ontarians in Toronto, Ontario, the station broadcasts at 105.1 on the FM dial. CHOQ is also available as a digital television radio feed on Rogers Cable in the Greater Toronto Area on channel 957. CHOQ's studios are located on Lansdowne Avenue (near Dundas Street West) in the Dufferin Grove neighbourhood, while its transmitter is located atop First Canadian Place.

CHOQ is owned by a cooperative, La Coopérative Radiophonique de Toronto.

== History ==
The history of this station dates back to 1991, when the group was granted a special temporary FM licence for a French-language community radio programming undertaking at Toronto, on a frequency of 99.1 MHz. The station would broadcast programs during "La Semaine française à Toronto", from June 16 to 23, 1991 and was incorporated as "La Coopérative radiophonique de Toronto inc." on July 5 the same year.

On June 16, 2000, the station was denied a licence to operate a French-language community FM radio station at Toronto on the frequency 93.5 MHz. This 93.5 frequency was awarded to CFXJ-FM.

On April 17, 2003, La Coopérative radiophonique de Toronto inc. received CRTC approval for a new French-language community FM radio station at Toronto, to operate at 105.1 MHz.

On October 18, 2004 the station received a $75,000 startup grant from the Ontario Trillium Foundation.

The station's launch was originally scheduled for 2005. The station did air a testing signal for three weeks in November of that year, but did not launch its permanent signal until May 1, 2006.

CHOQ-FM was one of 27 applicants for the 88.1 frequency vacated by the revocation in early 2011 of CKLN-FM's license, applying to move to the frequency. The bid was unsuccessful and the CRTC awarded the frequency to CIND-FM.

In 2011 and 2012, the station participated in the launch of campaign to establish a "French Quarter" in Toronto along Carlton Street, where several of the city's francophone institutions — including the Sacré-Cœur church, the Collège Français high school and the head offices of TFO — are located.

In January 2015, the station manager revealed that due to a tight advertising market and expenses related to the relocation of its transmitter, the station was in a financial crisis and may be forced to close as early as March if a solution could not be found. In March, the station confirmed that while an emergency crowdfunding campaign had fallen short of the goal, it was continuing to seek out other cooperative funding arrangements to allow it to continue broadcasting.

== Programming ==
The station primarily plays a francophone pop music format during the day, with some informational and magazine programming airing evenings and weekends. The station also publishes a weekly Top 40 singles chart in L'Express de Toronto.

Writer Gabriel Osson has been the host of Franco découvertes, a world music show devoted to international music from francophone countries, and writer Aristote Kavungu has been host of the cultural magazine show Franco-Hebdo.

The station used to broadcast dance music programming nightly between the hours of 10p.m. and 6a.m., branded as Energy 105.1 (Shock FM). This programming aired in English, and was not produced by Radio-Toronto, but was leased out to another company. This programming no longer airs on the station as of 2009; the station now produces its own programming during the overnight hours.
