= CJRT-FM =

Jazz radio station in Toronto

- Toronto, Ontario; Canada
- Broadcast area: Greater Toronto Area
- Frequency: 91.1 MHz
- Branding: JAZZ.FM91

Programming
- Format: Jazz/Public Radio

Ownership
- Owner: CJRT-FM Inc.

History
- First air date: November 22, 1949
- Former frequencies: 88.3 MHz (1949–1950)
- Call sign meaning: Journalism, Radio and Television

Technical information
- Licensing authority: CRTC
- Class: C1
- ERP: 36,183 watts
- HAAT: 449 metres (1,473 ft)
- Transmitter coordinates: 43°38′33″N 79°23′14″W

Links
- Webcast: Listen Live
- Website: jazz.fm

CJRT-FM (91.1 MHz) is a Canadian public radio station and charitable arts organization in Toronto, Ontario, known as JAZZ.FM91. The studios are on Pardee Avenue in the Liberty Village neighbourhood of Toronto. The station describes itself as Canada's only 24-hour all-jazz radio station, with evening and weekend specialty shows devoted to jazz-influenced R&B, blues, big band and Latin jazz. It has a professional staff of on-air hosts, with more than 90 volunteers assisting. It is listener-supported and holds periodic on-air fundraisers, seeking donations to support the station.

CJRT-FM has an effective radiated power (ERP) of 36,183 watts. Its transmitter is atop the CN Tower.

The station is simulcast on Bell Satellite TV channel 960, Rogers NextBox channel 933, and Shaw Direct channel 869.

JAZZ.FM91 is a registered charity that provides youth programs, workshops, internships and scholarships in partnership with educational institutions and other arts organizations.

== History ==
=== Origins ===
In 1949, Ryerson Institute of Technology (now Toronto Metropolitan University) received CBC approval to operate an educational FM station in Toronto (88.3 MHz - 3,000 watts).

On April 6, 1964, the licensee name was changed to the board of governors of Ryerson Polytechnical Institute (as it was then known), and CJRT-FM became a professionally staffed radio service, with the broadcast schedule increased from 7 am to midnight seven days a week. There was still some student training but that ended a few years later. Future Station Manager Cam Finley joined the station in December. It played classical, jazz, and folk music, with educational and public affairs programming, children's shows, and comedy from the BBC.

=== Independence ===
In 1973, Ryerson announced its intention to surrender the broadcast licence of CJRT-FM due to financial restraints. By now the station had achieved somewhat of a profile and the story reached the press. After a large public outcry, a year later in 1974, Ontario Premier Bill Davis announced that the provincial legislature would pass legislation to create an independent corporation to run the station and buy the license. On November 29, CJRT-FM INC. was incorporated by Ontario Letters Patent and CJRT-FM was transferred from Ryerson Polytechnical Institute to the new non-profit corporation. The station received money from the Ontario government and from companies and listeners through fundraising. Cam Finley was appointed acting manager in 1973, general manager in 1974 and president and GM in 1979. John Valentyn launched a weekly blues program. Bud Riley joined CJRT as news and public affairs director.

In co-operation with Ryerson and York University's Atkinson College, CJRT offered several on-air Open College courses from 1971 to 2003. In 2003, the service was transferred to Ryerson's Chang School of Continuing Education, which offers distance education through the internet, print, and recorded media rather than on radio. In its last years, Open College broadcasts aired Sunday mornings from 6 am to 8 am.

Following Ryerson's loss of ownership of CJRT in 1974, CKLN-FM was licensed as Ryerson's campus radio station from 1983 to 2011 followed by CJTM since 2016.

In 1975, Glen Woodcock began hosting The Big Band Show, which was still running more than 45 years later.

=== New format ===
In January 2001, the station quietly switched to an all-jazz format and rebranded as JAZZ.FM91. In 2004 Ross Porter, whose weeknight jazz programs on CBC Radio had made him a national name, and who later helped CanWest launch COOL-TV and Cool.FM radio, was hired to replace Chuck Camroux in July, as president and CEO

Two years later, after nearly 14 years occupying Ryerson property at 150 Mutual Street, CJRT moved to its current street-front facilities at 4 Pardee Ave. in the Liberty Village neighbourhood of Toronto. By this point, the station had added several more on-air personalities including Terry McElligott, Ralph Benmergui, Heather Bambrick, Bill King, Jaymz Bee, Walter Venafro, Reiner Schwarz and Amanda Martinez.

=== Leadership change ===
Then-president and CEO Ross Porter stepped down as CEO in June of 2018, following an investigation into allegations of workplace misconduct and creating a toxic work environment. Charles Cutts, former president and CEO of the Corporation of Massey Hall and Roy Thomson Hall, was appointed interim CEO.

A short time later, the station cut four hosts: Jaymz Bee, Mark Wigmore, Walter Venafro and David Basskin. David Wall, its director of community outreach and education, and two other employees were also affected. The station also underwent a change in board leadership, with chair Renah Persofsky replaced by David McGown. In December 2018, longtime midday host Terry McElligott resigned from the station.

The turmoil resulted in the departure of a number of on-air staff and a decline in donations to the station. At the end of 2018 a group of JAZZ.FM91 donors formed a group called “Save JAZZFM” and launched a campaign to hold an extraordinary meeting of the charity’s membership. Following an Ontario Court ruling granting access to the membership contact information to the Save JAZZFM under the leadership of Brian Hemming. A sufficient proportion of the membership signed a petition requiring the board of directors to call the extraordinary meeting to overturn the station's board of directors. A general meeting of the membership held on February 15, 2019, succeeded in removing the board by a vote of 446 to 435, electing a new board composed of the dissident group.

Lorie Russell, vice president and managing director of JAZZ.FM91 announced in September 2020 that she would be leaving the station in mid-December. Former JAZZ.FM Director of Sales and Marketing Dana Wigle returned to the station as general manager., Under new management, JAZZ.FM91 won several broadcasting awards and expanded its digital presence with the addition of podcasts, specialty channels and virtual concerts.

== Awards and honors ==
- Silver award, The Sound of Jazz, New York Festivals Radio Awards, 2018
- Silver award, Music to Listen to Jazz By with Ross Porter, New York Festivals Radio Awards, 2018
- Gold award, The Journey to Jazz and Human Rights, New York Festivals Radio Awards, 2020
- Winner, Campus or Community Station of the Year, Canadian Radio Awards, 2021
- Winner, Sound of Success Award, Canadian Radio Awards, 2021
- Finalist, Music Director of the Year, Canadian Radio Awards, 2021
- Finalist, Black History Month Vignettes, New York Festivals Radio Awards, 2021
- Finalist, The View From L.A., New York Festivals Radio Awards, 2021
- Winner, Best Radio Station, NOW Readers' Choice Poll, 2021
- Finalist, Best Radio Personality, NOW Readers' Choice Poll, 2021
- Gold award, Best Jazz Format, New York Festivals Radio Awards, 2022
- Finalist, Black History Month Vignettes, New York Festivals Radio Awards, 2022
- Finalist, Caribbean Christmas Mixtape, New York Festivals Radio Awards, 2022
- Finalist, In the Land of the Misty Giant, New York Festivals Radio Awards, 2022

== See also ==
- Ryerson Radio
