= CKLN-FM =

Former campus and community radio station in Toronto

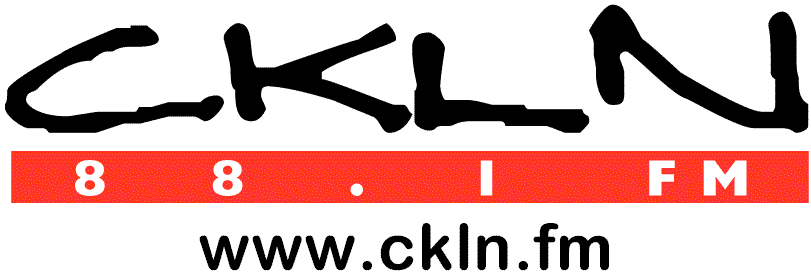
- Toronto, Ontario; Canada
- Broadcast area: Greater Toronto Area
- Frequency: 88.1 MHz

Programming
- Format: Campus–community radio
- Affiliations: Ryerson University

Ownership
- Owner: CKLN Radio Inc.

History
- First air date: 1983
- Last air date: April 15, 2011

CKLN-FM was a Canadian campus–community radio station in Toronto, Ontario, which broadcast at 88.1 MHz from 1983 until 2011. Based at Ryerson University, the station was known for alternative music, community affairs and multilingual programming, and for providing early exposure to Canadian hip hop artists. Its programs included Ron Nelson's The Fantastic Voyage, one of Canada's earliest radio programs devoted to hip hop.

CKLN experienced financial and governance difficulties during the 2000s. A dispute involving its board, staff and volunteers led to rival boards of directors, a lockout of its studios and months of irregular programming in 2009. The Canadian Radio-television and Telecommunications Commission (CRTC) subsequently found that the station had repeatedly failed to comply with federal broadcasting regulations and its conditions of licence. On January 28, 2011, the commission revoked CKLN's licence, effective February 12. The station remained on FM under a temporary court stay until April 15, 2011, when the Federal Court of Appeal declined to hear its appeal.

CKLN continued as an internet broadcaster after leaving the FM dial. It moved most of its production to the Regent Park neighbourhood and ceased operations on December 26, 2011, following the dissolution of CKLN Radio Inc. Many of its programs and volunteers subsequently joined Radio Regent. CKLN's former frequency was awarded to Rock 95 Broadcasting, which launched Indie88 in 2013. A separate campus station serving Ryerson, CJRU, began broadcasting in 2016.

== Early history ==
CKLN began as a closed circuit station set up in 1970 as Ryerson Community Radio, its broadcasts piped to loudspeakers around campus. In 1972, it became independent of Ryerson's Radio and Television Arts department and adopted the call letters CRFM. In 1978, the station adopted the call letters CKLN and was broadcast through campus via closed circuit cable. It was licensed as an over the air FM broadcaster by the CRTC in 1983 as a Ryerson University-based campus-community radio station and assigned the frequency of 88.1 MHz on the FM band and allowed to retain the CKLN call letters. Ryerson had announced that it would close its earlier radio station, CJRT-FM, in 1973 due to financial constraints; that station was saved in 1974 by the Ontario government headed by Bill Davis in 1974 as a government funded public radio station without formal ties to Ryerson.

Among CKLN's early accomplishments was the launch of Ron Nelson's new show The Fantastic Voyage in 1983, Canada's first radio show devoted to Rap. The program was influential in promoting and developing many of Canada's early hip hop stars. According to poet Clifton Joseph, the show was "the single most important agent responsible for the breaking of rap music in Toronto and laying the groundwork for the emergence of Canadian rap artists such as Michie Mee and Maestro Fresh Wes."

Other artists such as Blue Rodeo and k.d. lang received airplay on CKLN prior to being picked up by mainstream radio. The Globe and Mail says of the station that "it sat at the forefront of independent music and radical politics in the city for more than three decades, working with a shoe-string budget, and yet it somehow always managed to survive."

In the 1980s, the station helped create a news service to share content among left-wing stations worldwide including those run by the African National Congress and the FMLN in El Salvador. The station aired live coverage of the release of Nelson Mandela from prison.

CKLN was the first broadcast outlet to air Toronto's Gay Pride Day Parade.

In 1985, the station was estimated to have 50,000 weekly listeners. By 1991, its audience had grown to an estimated 140,000 listeners a week. In 1989, The Toronto Star voted CKLN as "best radio station" in its annual Sammy awards. In April 1992, one student successfully petitioned for a referendum to decide if the station should continue to receive student funding; CKLN won the referendum.

Former station manager Adam Vaughan, later a Member of Parliament, said in a 2015 interview that "What was great about CKLN is that it combined the strength of Ryerson with the diversity of Toronto... The diversity of the city and the diversity of the voices and the culture on air came to define CKLN and it was a huge part of our success." He added, however, that "The station, after I left, got very heavily invested in identity politics. And instead of bringing diversity together, groups kind of started to fight with each other and it was hugely problematic in terms of trying to unify an audience... You could see the station drifting further and further away from a position of strength and experimentation into bitterness and at times, straight up incompetency."

In its coverage of the Rwandan genocide, CKLN aired an investigation of the colonial history behind the events.

By September 2003, following the departure of station manager Conrad Collaco, CKLN was teetering on the brink of insolvency. As a result, the Ryerson Students' Union bailed out CKLN of $110,000 in debts. An earlier proposal by Collaco to deal with the station's financial problems with a $6 increase to the student levy was not approved by the student government which cited various issues such as the lack of audited statements, the lack of airtime for Ryerson students or acknowledgment of Ryerson on the air.

In August 2005, CKLN shifted its broadcast studios from the basement of Jorgenson Hall at Ryerson University to the second floor of the newly constructed Ryerson Student Campus Centre.

== Internal conflict and loss of licence ==
In November 2007, CKLN's board appointed board member Mike Phillips as interim station manager. It had been over four years since the position had been filled. On December 21, 2007, CKLN program director Tim May resigned "suddenly and questionably" and within days CKLN's board appointed board member Tony Barnes as interim program director without first advertising the post. The new hires, and the manner in which the hirings were carried out, proved unpopular with some and resulted in a special general meeting being called, which was attended by over 150 members, more than 90% of whom voted to impeach the board of directors. The management and board of CKLN viewed the Special General Meeting as illegitimate along with the impeachment vote and subsequently dismissed several dozen volunteer programmers as well as two paid staff, including the station's news director, who was allegedly told she was being fired for not seeing "eye to eye" with the board. Station manager Mike Phillips claimed that members of the Canadian Union of Public Employees and Ontario Coalition Against Poverty had stacked the February meeting and defended the dismissal of volunteer programmers by arguing, "If you have people decrying the station that is allowing them to go on the air, and breaking CRTC rules in the process, that can't be allowed to go on for very long."

For a time, the station had two rival boards of directors, both claiming to be the legitimate management. The first board, which hired Barnes and Phillips, was chaired by Josie Miner while a second board led by Arnold Minors was elected by opponents of the first board. The Ryerson Students' Union, which administered a student fee that, at the time, provided the station with 60 per cent of its budget, withheld funds until the conflict between the two rival boards was resolved. Responding to this action, the first board initiated a statement of claim in the Ontario Superior Court of Justice naming the RSU and Ryerson University as defendants.

With CKLN's financial situation deteriorating due to the RSU's withholding of funds, and with members of the first board fighting among themselves, on February 28, 2009, CKLN's studios were made inaccessible except to a faction on the first CKLN board and those they chose to admit. Live programming was suspended and previously aired material was repeated in its place.

On March 1, 2009, two individuals, Paulette Hamilton, one of the members of the first board who had been locked out the previous day, and Daibhid James, a programmer, were arrested after they "barricaded themselves into the radio station's studios." Ryerson University president Sheldon Levy reacted to the incident by stating that "I think they've overstayed their welcome if that's the welcome that we have on our property. I don't like it, I don't want it, and we don't need it here."

Later that month, the Ryerson Student Centre board voted unanimously to close the station until both sides of the dispute could negotiate CKLN's future. The Palin Foundation, which governs the student centre, consists of representatives of Ryerson University, the Ryerson Students' Union and the Continuing Education Students' Association of Ryerson (CESAR).

During the period of the lockout, which lasted until mid-September 2009, CKLN broadcast unattended loops of previously aired programs, jazz and pre-recorded speeches. Dead air was heard for sometimes weeks at a time. In June 2009, CKLN's broadcast antenna was damaged resulting in the signal strength being drastically reduced. CKLN's online stream was still operational through this period.

On July 9, 2009, in a statement by Chris McNeil, president of CESAR and chair of the Palin Foundation, CKLN was provided a deadline of July 24, 2009 for the station to elect a new board of directors or risk eviction. The July 24, 2009 meeting and elections were held, but became the subject of a legal action filed in the Ontario Superior Court of Justice Commercial Court by former CKLN board member Mary Young claiming it was "improper and illegal". On December 14, 2011, the legal action against CKLN was permanently stayed and a motion by Young to launch a derivative action was dismissed with Young ordered to pay CKLN $10,000 in costs.

== Licence revocation ==
Even before CKLN resumed scheduled programming in late September 2009, the CRTC expressed concerns over the station's inability to comply with licence requirements during the dispute, such as playing the aforementioned loop for several months in 2009, its failure to properly submit on-air logger tapes, program logs and complete annual financial returns since 2007, and that the CRTC licence for CKLN had been transferred to a third party without authorization.

In March 2010, the CRTC called CKLN to a hearing for May 12, 2010 in which the licensee was to "...show cause why the Commission should not take steps to suspend or revoke the broadcasting licence in question or why the Commission should not issue mandatory orders requiring the licensee to comply with the Regulations and its conditions of licence..." The hearing was postponed in part due to ongoing mediation efforts in the aforementioned Mary Young case. The CRTC made it clear soon after the postponement that CKLN would be called to a hearing by no later than the end of 2010. During this period, the CRTC required the station to file monthly progress reports on its efforts to improve its licensing compliance.

The CRTC called CKLN to a hearing that took place in Toronto over a two-day period beginning December 8, 2010.

On January 28, 2011, the CRTC revoked the licence of CKLN-FM due to continual breaches of the Broadcast Act and violations to their conditions of licence, ordering them to cease broadcasting by February 12, 2011.

Calling the decision "premature, disproportionate and inequitable", CRTC Commissioner Louise Poirier issued a dissenting opinion stating that she was "firmly opposed" to the decision and that licence revocation "should not have been used as a first step for this station"; according to Poirier, "the Commission has never revoked a licence without first issuing a mandatory order or reducing the licence term." The decision was also opposed by the National Campus and Community Radio Association, which stated in a press release that the commission "could have taken other reasonable steps to ensure regulatory compliance while allowing CKLN to continue serving the community".

CKLN has stated that most of its regulatory failures were committed by former staff who were no longer with the station. CKLN appealed the decision to the Federal Court of Appeal. On February 11, the station was granted a temporary stay, allowing it to remain on the air pending the Federal Court's decision on whether or not to grant the station leave to appeal the CRTC's order.

On April 15, 2011, the Federal Court of Appeal announced that it would not be hearing the appeal and said the station must cease broadcasting on 88.1 FM immediately. CKLN continued broadcasting and podcasting via the internet as its exclusive outlet from that point.

== Reaction to loss of licence ==
CKLN station manager Jacky Tuinstra-Harrison said that the CRTC failed to follow its own policy of graduated discipline: "The CRTC could have followed their own policy, but did not; they did not pursue avenues such as warnings, fines, mandatory orders or other options against CKLN, but moved directly to the most serious of measures- revocation. We were not at any point offered alternatives" and that the claim that "CKLN's 'demise' could have been avoided is an admonishment, which could have been made to any of the last six CKLN boards".

On April 18, 2011, in his inaugural television broadcast on Canada's Sun News Network, as well as his column in the Sun Media newspaper chain, conservative commentator Ezra Levant claimed that the CRTC's decision on CKLN was just another oppressive example of arbitrary government bureaucracy and interference into the lives and businesses of ordinary Canadians.

Toronto city councillor Adam Vaughan said: "It's just astonishing that the CRTC can do this to a station that's been true to its mandate, that's sustained its commitment to community-based programming, the damage it does to communities served by this station, you couldn't even begin to quantify." Vaughan told the Toronto Star that "It's very sad that the CRTC couldn't sit down and work with this clearly volunteer organization and give them the benefit of the doubt and help them solve the problem rather than simply render a very tough decision against them."

Referring to previous boards of directors, outgoing Ryerson Students Union president and CKLN director Toby Whitfield observed: "There's been so much infighting for so many years, people lost sight of the purpose of the station. The privilege of having a licence is amazing, and I think that's what was missing," adding that the current board had gotten more students involved.

== Move to Regent Park ==
On August 2, 2011, in a statement posted on CKLN's website, it was announced that the Palin Foundation would evict CKLN on August 27, 2011. It was confirmed officially by CKLN on August 4, 2011, that, after the eviction, CKLN internet streaming would emanate almost exclusively from the Regent Park Focus Youth Media Arts Centre, a community group which offers media training programs for economically disadvantaged youth in the neighbourhood and which had already produced a weekly program for broadcast on CKLN for a number of years.

According to then station manager Jacky Tuinstra-Harrison, "They have a social mission which is very similar to ours, which is to have citizens participate in their media.... It's a wonderful opportunity to expand on our social mission, representing marginalized communities or communities that don't get to represent themselves a lot in mainstream media."

== Dissolution ==
At a CKLN membership meeting held on October 11, 2011, a motion was passed to seek court approval for the dissolution of CKLN Radio Incorporated. Court approval for dissolution was granted on December 14, 2011. CKLN.fm ceased operations on December 26, 2011, with most of its programs and volunteers moving to Radio Regent, a new internet radio service owned and operated by Regent Park Focus Youth Media Arts Centre and unaffiliated with CKLN Radio Inc.

== Fate of 88.1 and new Ryerson application ==
On September 28, 2011, Evanov Radio Group (via licensee Dufferin Communications) submitted an application to move CIRR-FM (which carried a contemporary hit radio format targeting the LGBT community) from 103.9 to CKLN's former frequency on 88.1. Per its competitive licensing process, the CRTC issued a call for competing applicants, and received 27 submissions in total. The applications included submissions by MZ Media, Astral Media, Newcap Radio, Larche Communications, the Canadian Broadcasting Corporation, Trust Communications, Intercity Broadcasting, CHIN Radio/TV International, La Coopérative Radiophonique de Toronto and numerous ethnic broadcasters, as well as a new student group from Ryerson University that planned to relaunch the station with a new governance model.

On September 11, 2012, the license was awarded to Rock 95 Broadcasting Ltd., which launched its new station CIND-FM on the frequency in 2013.

In 2013, Radio Ryerson Inc. launched The Scope, an internet radio station whose application for an AM radio licence was heard by the CRTC on September 25, 2014 and was granted by the CRTC on December 11. The new station began broadcasting on 1280 AM, with the call sign CJRU, on March 31, 2016.

In 2016, the CKLN-FM call sign was taken by Newcap Radio for a transmitter in Clarenville, Newfoundland and Labrador, which operates as a rebroadcaster of CHVO-FM in Carbonear.

== Legacy ==
CKLN-FM is regarded as one of Canada's most influential campus and community radio stations. During its nearly three decades on the air, it provided an important platform for independent musicians, community activists, and underrepresented voices that received little exposure on commercial radio.

The station played a significant role in the development of Canadian hip hop. Through programs such as The Fantastic Voyage, hosted by Ron Nelson, CKLN introduced audiences to emerging artists including Michie Mee, Maestro Fresh Wes and other pioneers of Toronto's rap scene. Poet and broadcaster Clifton Joseph described the station as instrumental in laying the groundwork for the emergence of Canadian rap music.

CKLN also helped launch or develop the careers of numerous broadcasters, journalists and media personalities, including Ralph Benmergui, Adam Vaughan, Paul Romanuk, Min Sook Lee and Denise Benson.

Following the station's dissolution in 2011, many former programmers and volunteers joined Radio Regent, an internet radio service operated by Regent Park Focus Youth Media Arts Centre. In 2016, CJRU began broadcasting as a new campus station serving Toronto Metropolitan University, although it is legally and organizationally distinct from CKLN.

The station's archives, recordings and memories have continued to be cited in studies of Canadian campus radio, independent music and Toronto's cultural history, and CKLN is frequently remembered as one of the city's most important incubators of alternative media and community broadcasting.

== CKLN alumni ==
- Ralph Benmergui - former CKLN news director and producer (1980s), later a host on CBC Television, CBC Radio, and CJRT-FM
- Kolter Bouchard - former CKLN host and board member, as of November 2018 afternoon drive co-host on CFNY-FM.
- Tanya Kim - Ryerson graduate and former voice-over artist for CKLN promos and announcements circa 1998, current co-host of CTV's etalk
- Kirk LaPointe - CKLN station manager (late 1970s), later managing editor at the Vancouver Sun, CTV, The Canadian Press and the National Post. From 2010 to 2012 he was ombudsman for the Canadian Broadcasting Corporation. Vancouver mayoral candidate in 2014.
- Denise Benson - Development Director then Program and Music Director (1989-1994), host of Mental Chatter (1987-2008). Now a respected DJ and Journalist. Writer of Then and Now Toronto Nightlife History, a fascinating, intimate look at four decades of social spaces, dance clubs, and live music venues.
- Eun Sook Lee - CKLN News Director (1990–1991), and Station Manager (1992–1993). Currently the Executive Director of the AAPI Civic Engagement Fund.
- Min Sook Lee - CKLN news director (1996–1998), later a documentary filmmaker and political candidate
- Jeffrey Morgan - Authorized biographer of Alice Cooper and The Stooges
- Alex Narvaez hosted Off Da Tracks on CKLN, currently the lead host on Complex Canada.
- Dames Nellas DJ'd, currently afternoon drive-time/evening DJ on CKFM-FM in Toronto.
- Ron Nelson - host of The Fantastic Voyage and Reggaemania, CKLN Board chair from 2009 to 2011. Currently a concert promoter, producer, and lecturer at York University.
- Preet Khalsa - host of Harmonic Convergence (1990-2008)
- Richard Paul - host of Latin Party, later a host of Two New Hours on CBC Radio
- Norman "Otis" Richmond - host from 1983 until 2011 of various programs including Diasporic Music and the flagship news magazine Saturday Morning Live, longtime news director
- Kobena Aquaa-Harrison - hosted Sounds of Africa (1989 - 2010) replacing founders Sam Mensah and Thaddy Ulzen. Later president/ artistic director Music Africa/ AfroFest, Michèzo! founder, writer WORD Magazine. Composer/ performer for film, theatre, dance, television, stage
- Paul Romanuk - DJ and hockey play-by-play announcer (Toronto Marlies) from 1981 to 1985, later a sports broadcaster with TSN and Hockey Night In Canada.
- Adam Vaughan - CKLN station manager (1985–1987), later a municipal affairs reporter for CBLT and CITY-TV, city councillor, and then a Liberal Member of Parliament (Trinity—Spadina)

== See also ==
- Ryerson Radio
