= Bank of Montreal Building (Toronto) =

- Interactive map of the Bank of Montreal Building area

General information
- Location: Toronto, Ontario, 50 King Street West, Canada
- Coordinates: 43.648808°N 79.380588°W
- Construction started: 1938
- Completed: 1948
- Demolished: 1975

Design and construction
- Architects: Chapman Oxley and Facey; Marani and Morris; K. R. Blatherwick

The Bank of Montreal Building was a 16-storey office tower located at the northwest corner of King Street and Bay Street in Toronto, Ontario. It was the secondary headquarters of the Bank of Montreal after its head office in Montreal. Architects Chapman and Oxley designed the building in 1938 and construction began that same year. After the outbreak of World War II in September 1939, construction halted with only three storeys completed. After the war, the plans were modified, building efforts restarted, and the tower was completed and officially opened in 1948. The structure remained in use for just 27 years before it was demolished in 1975.

== History and design ==
In 1938, the Bank of Montreal hired Toronto architecture firm Chapman and Oxley to design a new office tower. The design was to include four floors for the bank and 12 floors of rentable offices above. Construction began in 1938, but upon the outbreak of war in September 1939, halted with only three floors complete. The remainder of the steel had been fabricated and stayed in storage during the War. Following the cessation of hostilities, the Bank elected to proceed with construction, albeit with several alterations to the original plan. During the war, Alfred Chapman had become ill, and thus Marani and Morris joined original firm (which had become Chapman Oxley and Facey). Associate architect K. R. Blatherwick also joined the design team. Construction began again in 1946 and concluded in 1948.

The building extended 94 feet on King Street and 152 feet on Bay Street. It was finished in Queenston limestone with a seven-foot base of silver grey granite. The first floor held the banking hall; the second floor held the board room, men's and women's lounges, and dining rooms; and the third floor held bank offices. Along Bay Street the building was set back 10 feet above the third floor and set back again above the 14th floor. The main vaults were designed by Frederick S. Holmes and were located on two levels and were 59' x 50' in area. The security vault at the basement level 15' below the ground floor, had walls, roof and floor of very hard concrete, reinforced with heavy, closely spaced, interlaced bars of special steel. This vault was lined on floors, walls and ceiling with several layers of steel and copper of drill and torch resistive protection.

The Bank of Montreal building was one of four banking head offices located at the corner of King and Bay, the others being the Bank of Toronto Building (Carrère and Hastings, 1911), the Imperial Bank Building (Sproatt and Rolph, 1934), and the Bank of Nova Scotia Building (Mathers and Haldenby). The intersection of King and Bay acquired the nickname "MINT corner" for Montreal, Imperial, Nova Scotia, and Toronto.

In 1975 the Bank of Montreal demolished the building to make way for its new First Canadian Place. Upon completion in 1977, the Bank of Montreal moved its headquarters from Montreal to the new tower in Toronto.
