= Chang School of Continuing Education =

University department

G. Raymond Chang School of Continuing Education
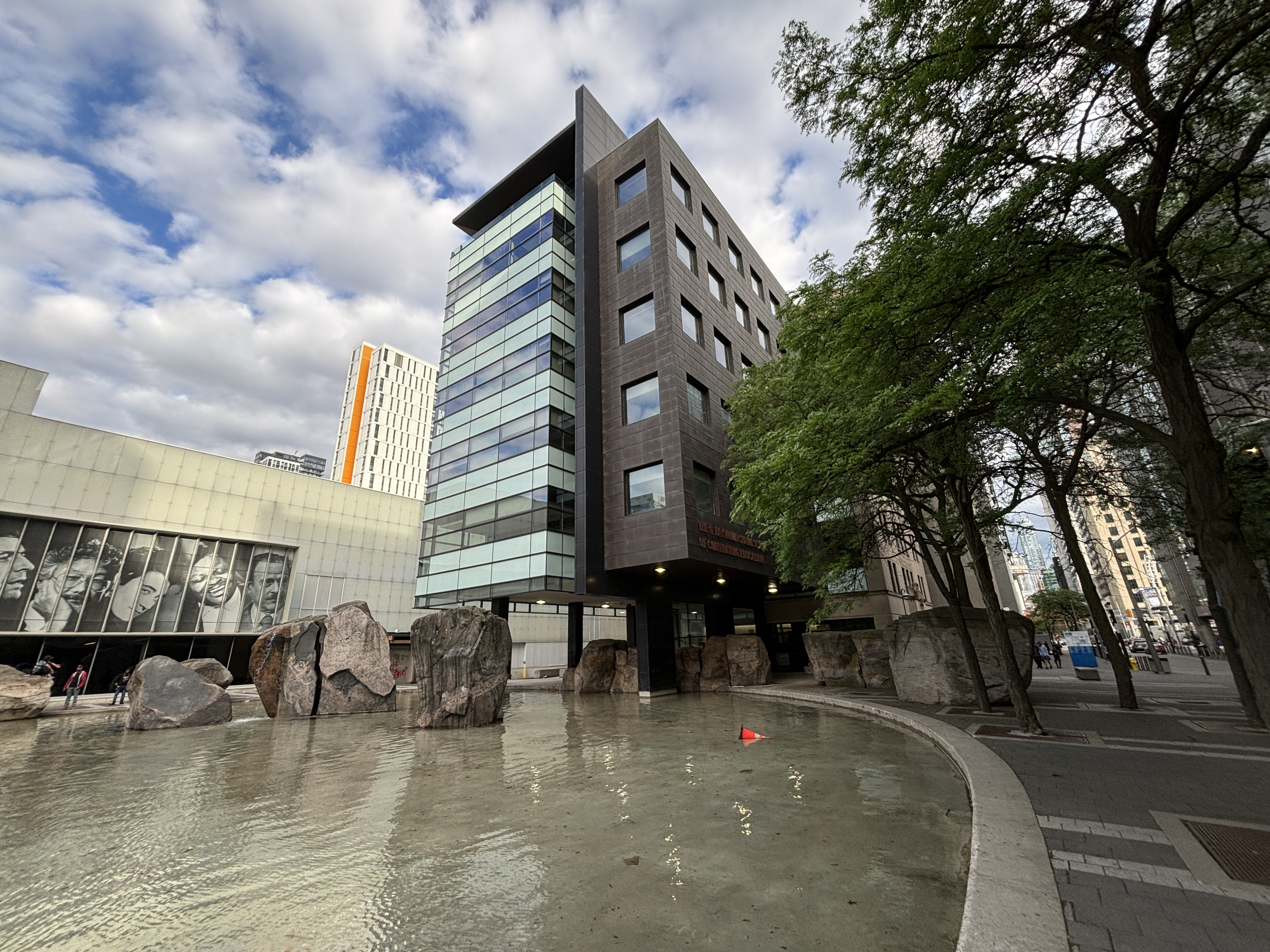
- Heaslip House, as seen from the intersection of Victoria Street and Gould Street
- Named for: G. Raymond Chang
- Type: Public
- Parent institution: Toronto Metropolitan University
- Dean: Linda Koechli
- Students: 2714 (2025-26)
- Location: Toronto, Ontario, Canada
- Campus: Urban
- Website: continuing.torontomu.ca

The G. Raymond Chang School of Continuing Education (commonly known as the Chang School of Continuing Education or simply the Chang School) is the school responsible for continuing education within Toronto Metropolitan University in Toronto.

The school is named for the late G. Raymond Chang, third Chancellor of Toronto Metropolitan University (known at the time as Ryerson University) and Director of CI Financial. The Chang School's offices are located in Heaslip House on the Toronto Metropolitan University campus.

In 2003, Open College was merged into the Chang School. Open College had offered Ryerson credits through distance education with lectures aired on radio station CJRT since 1971.
