= F. H. Herbert =

Canadian architect

- Born: Frederick Henry Herbert; 1865; Bath, England
- Died: 1914 (aged 48–49); Toronto, Ontario
- Occupation: Architect

Frederick Henry Herbert (1865–1914) was an architect practicing in Toronto, Ontario, during the late 19th century and early 20th century. Several buildings that he designed have survived into the 21st century and have been registered as significant heritage properties. He was one of the city's best-known practitioners specializing in residential architecture at the close of the 19th century.

Herbert moved to Toronto in 1887. According to the Biographical Dictionary of Architects in Canada, "He was born in Bath, England, but no information can be found on his early education or training there."

Herbert designed close to 150 buildings over the course of his career.

== Selected buildings designed by Herbert ==
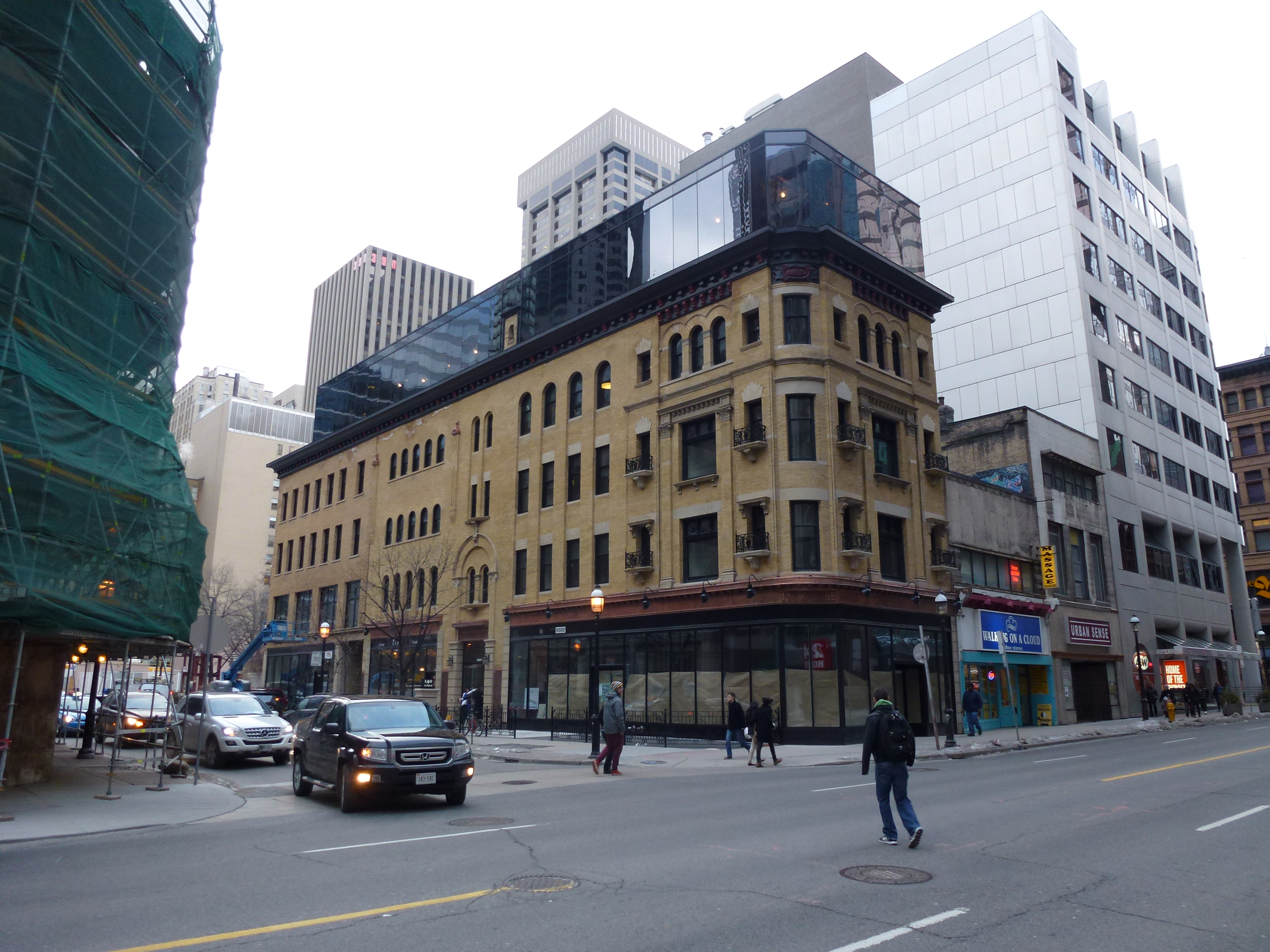
The Dineen Building was designed by Herbert in 1897

- Arena Gardens was an 8,000 seat indoor arena, the largest in Canada, built in 1912 at a cost of $500,000.
- The Dineen Building, designed by Herbert in 1897, was extensively renovated in 2012.
- 99 Jarvis Street, another building Herbert designed, is being marketed as a "development opportunity".
- 180 St. George Street was completed in 1898 as the residence of Thomas W. Horn. The mansion currently serves as the Toronto chapter of the Zeta Psi collegiate fraternity.
- 2 Temperance Avenue was rebuilt in 2012.
- 6 Walmer Road was designated under the Ontario Heritage Act in 2012.
