= CFBN =

Former radio station in Ontario, Canada

Mississauga, Ontario; Canada
- Broadcast area: Greater Toronto Area
- Frequency: 1280 kHz
- Branding: Canada's Business Network

Programming
- Format: news, traffic conditions, airport, weather
- Affiliations: Canada's Business Network

Ownership
- Owner: Greater Toronto Airports Authority (1980s–2008)

History
- First air date: 26 July 1985
- Last air date: November 2007
- Former call signs: CFYZ
- Former frequencies: 530 kHz
- Call sign meaning: Business Network

CFBN was a Canadian radio station, broadcasting at 1280 kHz in Mississauga, Ontario. The station, owned by the Greater Toronto Airports Authority, aired a business news format branded as Canada's Business Network, as well as some travel and weather information reports for Toronto Pearson International Airport.

The station commenced operation in 1985, originally on AM 530 before switching to 1280 when Fort Erie's CJFT was assigned 530. Previously operating under the call sign CFYZ, the automated station originally broadcast flight arrival and departure schedules, traffic directions, parking information, and weather reports to those in the immediate vicinity of Toronto Pearson International Airport.

Live broadcasting began in December 2000. In 2002, the Greater Toronto Airports Authority was given approval by the CRTC to increase power. On May 31, 2005, the radio service reverted from live broadcasting to recorded airport information. On April 9, 2007, the station adopted the business format, but continued to broadcast airport traffic reports and advisories along with the business programming. Among programming heard on CFBN beginning April 2007 was syndicated American programming such as Dennis Miller and the Glenn Beck Program, which had never before been heard in Canada.

The station ceased broadcasting in November 2007. CFBN's license was revoked by the CRTC, as requested by the GTAA, on January 17, 2008.

In 2014, the frequency was reassigned to CJRU, a proposed campus community radio station at Ryerson University, (now Toronto Metropolitan University) which began broadcasting in 2016. The CFBN call sign has since been reassigned to a low-power traffic information station (93.3) for St. Lawrence Seaway Management Corporation in St. Catharines, Ontario to provide motorist information crossing bridges across the Welland Canal.
