= G. Raymond Chang =

Chancellor of Ryerson University

G. Raymond Chang OC, OJ
- 郑佰勋

3rd Chancellor of Ryerson University
- In office 2006–2012
- President: Sheldon Levy
- Preceded by: John Craig Eaton II
- Succeeded by: Lawrence Bloomberg

Personal details
- Born: November 23, 1948 Kingston, Jamaica
- Died: July 27, 2014 (aged 65) Toronto, Ontario, Canada
- Spouse: Donette Chin-Loy
- Children: 2
- Education: St. George's College, Jamaica
- Alma mater: University of Toronto

G. Raymond Chang, OC, OJ (Chinese: 郑佰勋; November 23, 1948 – July 27, 2014), was a Jamaican-born Canadian businessman, philanthropist and from 2006 until 2012, the third chancellor of Ryerson University.

== Early life ==
He was of Hakka Chinese descent, born the fifth of 12 children to Gladstone Vernon and Maisie Chang in Kingston, Jamaica. His father was a second generation Chinese Jamaican born to Chinese immigrants while his mother was born in Guyana, also of Chinese Guyanese descent.

Upon the death of Maisie's brother, Chang's parents adopted five of their then-orphaned nieces and nephew. This newly blended and inter-related family now comprised 12 children and was raised together with Chang's other cousins on two back-to-back streets on which were constructed five houses, each built for an individual "Chang" family. In total, 35 cousins lived side-by-side "around-the-block" of five houses.

Gladstone and Maisie, along with Gladstone's brothers and sisters, owned a successful bakery and several, other businesses on the island. From an early age, Gladstone and Maisie Chang insisted that all 12 children pursue a university education; after he was educated as St. George's College, Jamaica.

== Education ==
Chang emigrated in 1967 first to Troy in the United States (briefly at Rensselaer Polytechnic Institute) and then to Toronto both times to attend university. He earned an engineering degree from the University of Toronto and went on to earn his qualifications as a Chartered Accountant and Chartered Financial Analyst and largely pursued a career in finance.

== Career ==
He worked for Coopers & Lybrand for a time, and until 1983, when he and some partners bought into a small Toronto mutual fund management company that managed $5 million in assets. This predecessor company would grow and develop into CI Financial, which in 2014 managed $100 billion of investments. Chang started at CI Financial as vice-president and chief operating officer, and was promoted to COO and president in 1996, becoming president and CEO in 1998, and then chairman and CEO from 1999 to 2010. At that time, the Company had become the second largest publicly traded mutual fund company in Canada. Chang also owned an investment holding company, G. Raymond Chang Ltd., and founded software firm Mercatus Technologies Inc. Chang was also a shareholder and board member of various other Canadian and Jamaican companies.

== Awards, decorations and philanthropy ==
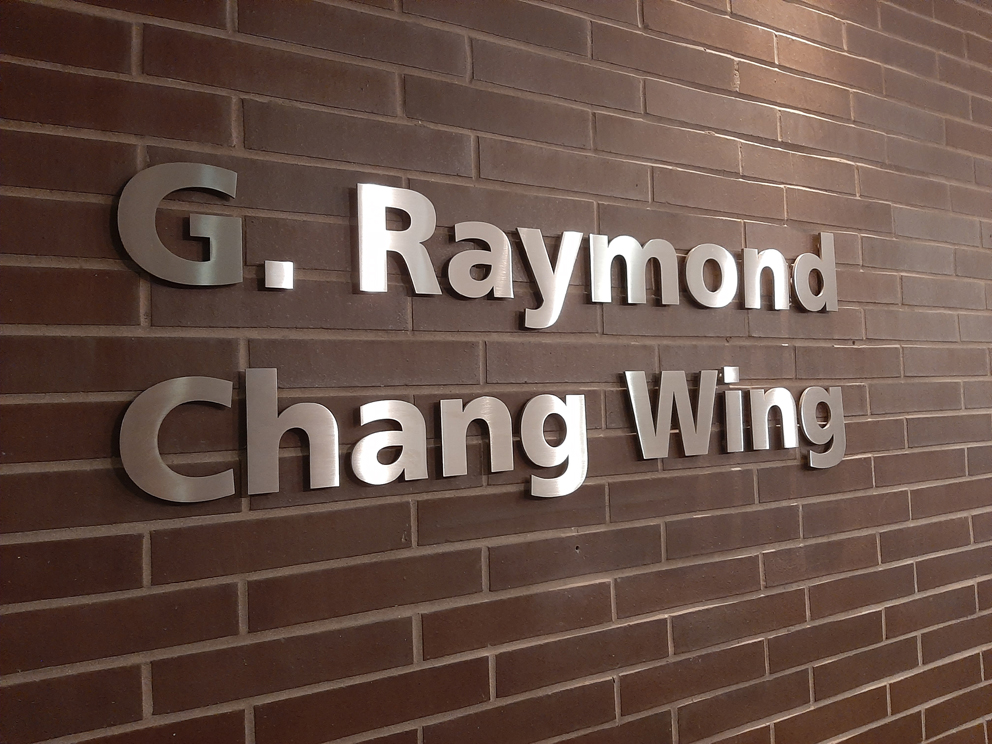
The G. Raymond Chang Wing at the Holland Bloorview Kids Rehabilitation Hospital in Toronto

He was appointed to the Order of Jamaica in 2011 and as an officer of the Order of Canada in 2014.

Ryerson University's Chang School of Continuing Education is named after him as benefactor. In 2003, the Chang family made a $5 million donation to Ryerson University (now Toronto Metropolitan University), leading to the naming of the G. Raymond Chang School of Continuing Education in recognition of their support for lifelong learning. The gift helped strengthen the university's continuing education programs and remains one of the institution's landmark philanthropic contributions. Chang also donated tens of millions of dollars to various institutions including Ryerson University, the Royal Ontario Museum, the Centre for Addiction and Mental Health and the University of the West Indies. He was a board member of the Toronto General & Western Hospital Foundation, endowed The Gladstone and Maisie Chang Chair at the University of Toronto in internal medicine, and started a fellowship for West Indian doctors at the University Health Network. In 2010, he was named Outstanding Philanthropist of the Year by the Toronto Chapter of the Association of Fundraising Professionals.

== Death ==
Chang, who suffered from leukemia, died at the age of 65, several months after undergoing a bone marrow transplant. His funeral mass occurred on August 9, 2014 at St. Patrick’s Catholic Church in Toronto and was presided over, amongst others, by Rev. Fr. Luc Amoussou, the Archbishop of Kingston Charles Dufour, followed by a reception hosted by Ryerson University at their Mattamy Athletic Centre. He is interred at Holy Cross Catholic Cemetery, Thornhill, Ontario. His widow Donette Chin-Loy was named Chancellor designate of Toronto Metropolitan University in June 2024.
