= Heaslip House =

Building of Toronto Metropolitan University

Coordinates: 43.658939°N 79.381027°W

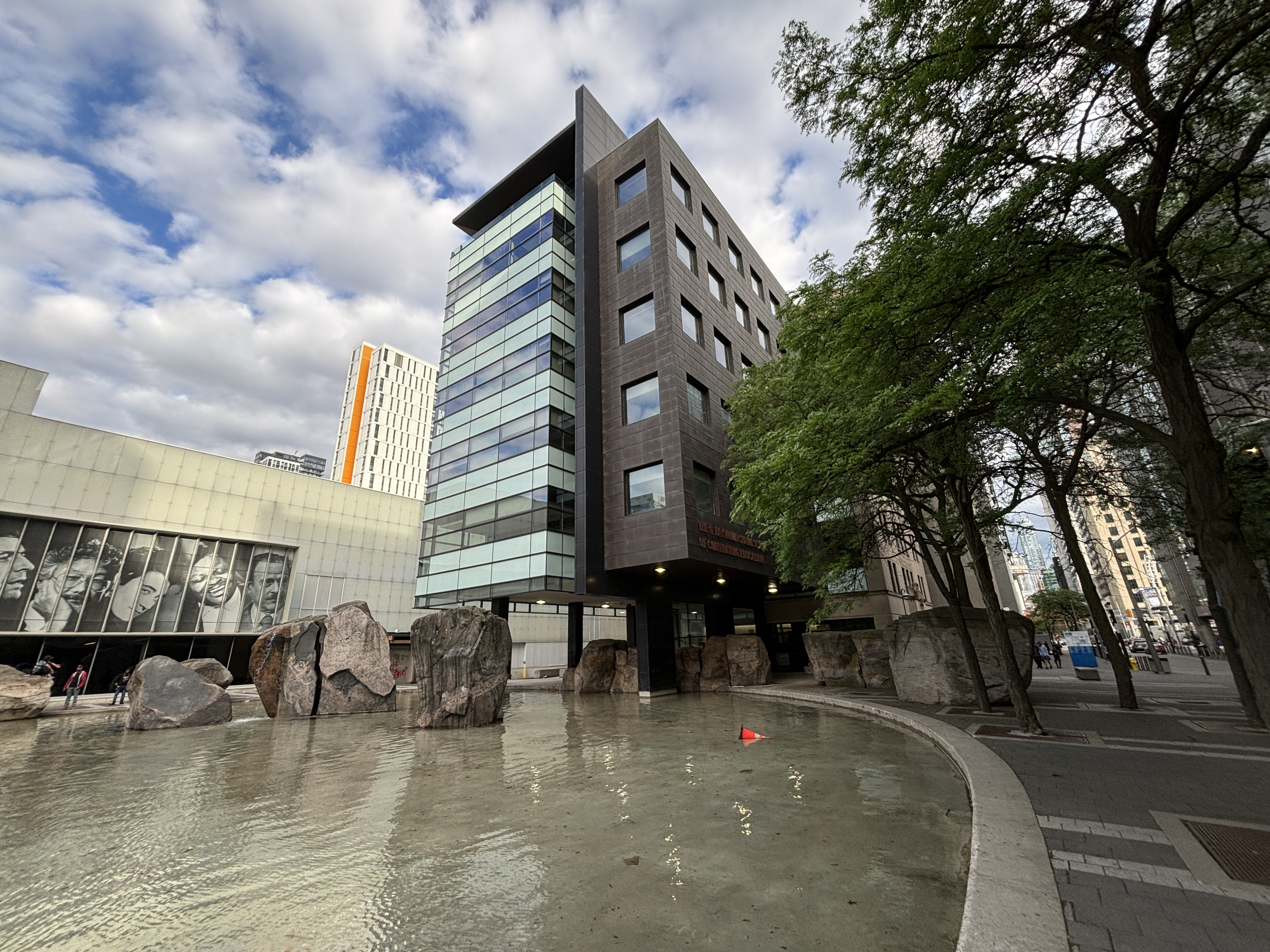
Heaslip House in 2024

Heaslip House is an office building of Toronto Metropolitan University, serving as the home of the Chang School of Continuing Education, University Relations, and Yellowhead Institute. The current building was constructed in 1939 as the administrative headquarters of Canadian Breweries Limited, having previously been the site of a public school.

== History ==
The site now occupied by Heaslip House was home to a public school dating back to at least 1880, however by the 1930s, the school had been demolished. Canadian Breweries, owned by business tycoon E. P. Taylor, hired the architecture firm Chapman and Oxley to construct a head office for its O'Keefe Brewery on the site of the old school, which was completed in 1939. At the time, this building was referred to as O'Keefe House, although that name is now used to describe the mansion of Eugene O'Keefe, the founder of O'Keefe Brewery, down the street at Bond Street. Right next to this building, also built partially on the site of the old public school, was a new bottling plant for O'Keefe Breweries. In the 1950s, the neighbouring Catholic church on Victoria Street and Gould Street was demolished and turned into a parking lot, later becoming Devonian Pond.

In the 1960s, Toronto Metropolitan University, then known as the Ryerson Polytechnic Institute, expressed an interest in buying the site of the O'Keefe Brewery. The sale was finalized in 1966. The institute used the former bottling plant as the home of the Faculty of Business, and turned the main site of the O'Keefe Brewery into a parking lot. Today, the main site of the brewery is part of 10 Dundas East, a mixed-use development. In 2006, renovations of Heaslip House were completed, and in 2012, the university announced that it would be the new home of the G. Raymond Chang School of Continuing Education.

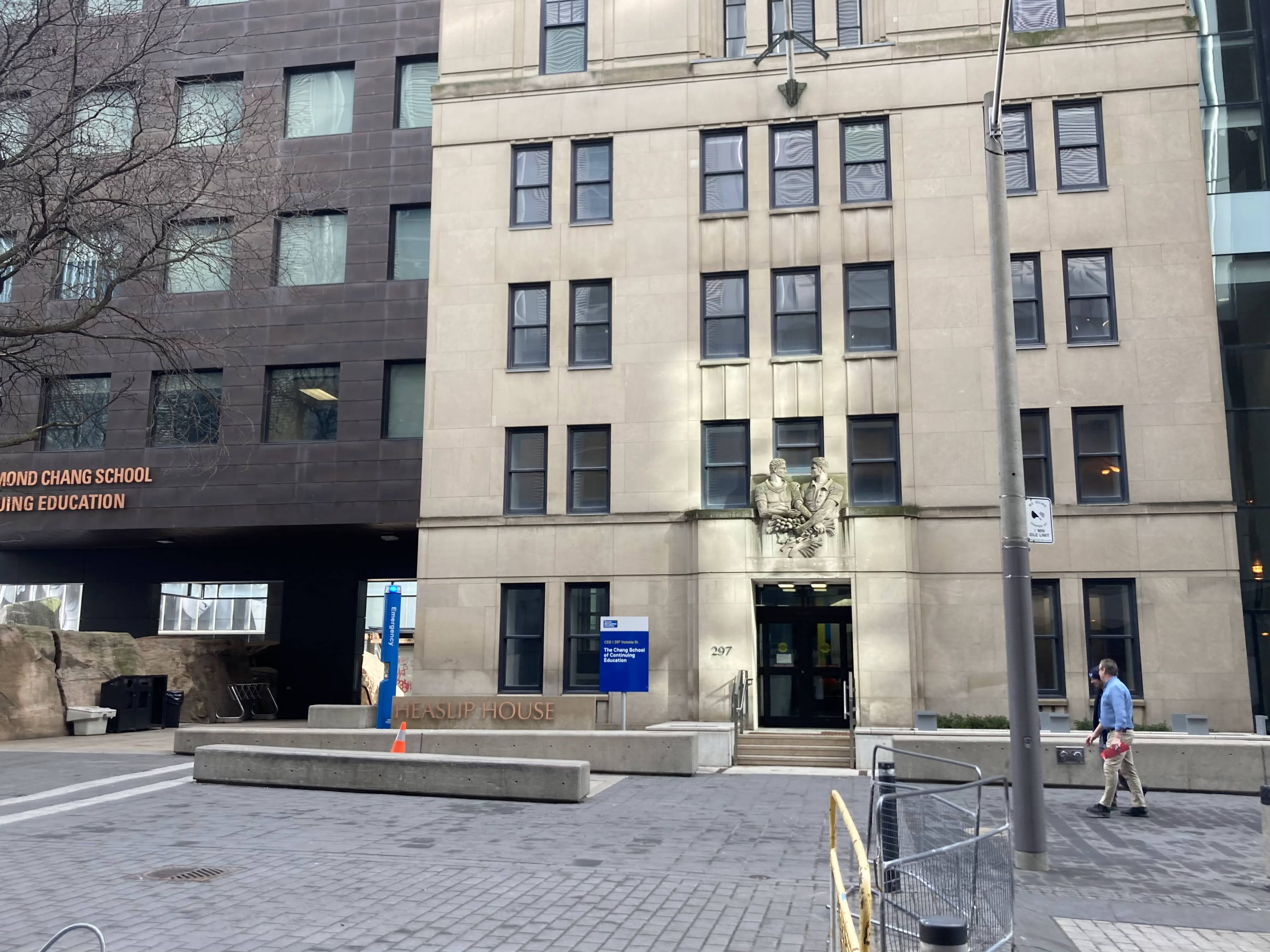
Victoria Street entrance to Heaslip House in 2024
