= Regent Park Focus Youth Media Arts Centre =

Non-profit media group in Regent Park, Toronto

The Regent Park Focus Youth Media Arts Centre is a non-profit group in Toronto, Ontario's Regent Park neighbourhood. Launched in 1990 in conjunction with Toronto's Centre for Addiction and Mental Health and the Government of Ontario, the group offers media training programs for youth in the neighbourhood, including programs in television and radio production, photography, magazine publishing, new media and social marketing.

The group's radio stream originally produced a weekly radio series, Catch da Flava, which was podcasted and aired on Toronto radio station CKLN-FM. After CKLN's broadcasting license was revoked by the Canadian Radio-television and Telecommunications Commission in 2011, the station moved its operations to Regent Park Focus, briefly becoming an Internet radio service before ceasing operations permanently in December. Regent Park Focus subsequently launched a successor service, Radio Regent, in January 2012.
