= University of the Air (TV series) =

Canadian distance education television program

- Genre: Distance education
- Country of origin: Canada
- Original language: English

Production
- Running time: 30 minutes each
- Production company: Various affiliates for CTV

Original release
- Network: CTV
- Release: 1966 – 1983

University of the Air is a daily distance education television program seen early mornings on the CTV Television Network in Canada between October 11, 1965 and 1983; prior to the establishment of 24-hour broadcasting, in most regions it was the first program aired each day, usually at 5:30 or 6 a.m., though it would also turn up at other times. Each episode consisted of a lecture given by a university instructor. Individual episodes of this series were produced locally by CTV affiliates nationwide, for national broadcast on the CTV network under national co-ordinator Nancy Fraser.

Previous lectures of this series were also broadcast on TVO and CHCH-TV Hamilton, both as part of TVO's educational television schedule.

It is best remembered for its opening and closing title sequence, which consisted of a black-bordered hexagonal kaleidoscope background and electronic theme music.

In October 2014, the Dalhousie University Archives posted a number of complete episodes dating from 1976 to YouTube featuring Dalhousie lecturers.

== See also ==
- University of the Air (CBC radio series) - Similar, but unrelated, CBC Radio series
- Sunrise Semester - Similar series on CBS in the United States
