= CJTM =

Radio station at Toronto Metropolitan University in Toronto

- Toronto, Ontario; Canada
- Frequency: 1280 kHz
- Branding: Met Radio

Programming
- Format: Campus and community radio

Ownership
- Owner: Toronto Metropolitan Media Inc.

History
- First air date: March 31, 2016
- Former call signs: CJRU (2016–2023)

Technical information
- Licensing authority: CRTC
- Class: LP AM
- Power: 99 watts
- Transmitter coordinates: 43°38′33″N 79°20′22″W

Links
- Website: metradio.ca

CJTM, branded as Met Radio, is a low-powered AM campus and community radio station, owned and operated by Toronto Metropolitan Media Inc. (formerly Radio Ryerson Inc.) at Toronto Metropolitan University (formerly Ryerson University), which was granted a broadcast license by the Canadian Radio-television and Telecommunications Commission on December 11, 2014.

The station broadcasts on 1280 kHz with a signal strength of 99 watts as well as online. The station officially launched on the AM band under the call sign CJRU on March 31, 2016, after several weeks of test transmissions.

The 1280 AM frequency was previously used by CFBN. In July 2023, the station announced its call sign change to CJTM and rebrand to Met Radio, as part of the institution's overall renaming from Ryerson University to Toronto Metropolitan University.

== Background ==
Met Radio has operated as an internet radio station since April 2013. In February 2014, an application was filed with the Canadian Radio-television and Telecommunications Commission for an AM license. The CRTC held a hearing on September 25, 2014 and released its decision approving a license December 11, 2014.

The internet station was started after Ryerson Radio's previous application to acquire an FM license for CKLN-FM's former frequency of 88.1 MHz was rejected by the CRTC on September 11, 2012, in favour of indie rock station CIND-FM. Ryerson-based CKLN-FM had previously broadcast on 88.1 from 1983 to 2011 when the station lost its license due to compliance issues.

The station contrasts itself from its predecessor, CKLN. According to volunteer co-ordinator Emily Joveski: "One of the stigmas associated with radio at Ryerson is some of the mistrust [from some older students and faculty] lingering from the previous station. But we are different. We are actually accessible to all students, and we will be a positive influence on Ryerson as well as the community."

The application to the CRTC was supported by intervenors such as musician Ron Sexsmith, Blue Rodeo founding member Bob Wiseman, Toronto city councillors Kristyn Wong-Tam and Mike Layton, Liberal MP Chrystia Freeland and the National Campus and Community Radio Association.

== Governance ==
Met Radio is governed by a nine-member board of directors with includes three representatives of the student body, three representatives of Toronto Metropolitan University's administration, one representative of the station's volunteers and two directors, chosen by the board, to represent the community at large. The board's chair is Gerd Hauck, the dean of TMU's Faculty of Communication & Design. Ted Rogers School of Management dean Steven Murphy and Radio Television Arts chair Charles Falzon also sit on the board on behalf of the university, while the president of the Ryerson Students Union sits as one of the student representatives. While two individuals intervening at the CRTC hearing opposed the station's application alleging too few community directors, the station responded by telling the CRTC that "it was appropriate to restrict membership in this case to avoid governance problems such as those that led to the revocation of CKLN-FM's licence, where a second competing board of directors was elected by members". The CRTC agreed in its decision that "the proposed governance model is appropriate and provides for balanced representation from students, the community, the university and volunteers".

== Format ==
The terms of its license require Met Radio to air at least 120 hours of local and Canadian programming a week with a format that will be "a mixture of pop, rock, dance, acoustic, folk, folk-oriented, world beat international, jazz, blues, hip-hop, and experimental music" with a "music discovery approach" focusing on emerging artists. The schedule also includes "in-depth spoken word programming and programming targeted to specific groups within the community".

The station won five Community Radio Awards at the National Campus and Community Radio Association's conference in 2025.

== Transmitter ==
Met Radio leases transmitter space from a tower in Toronto's Port Lands district, at Unwin Street and Cherry Street, which is also used by CHHA 1610 Voces Latinas.
