= CI Financial =

Canadian investment management company

CI Financial Inc.

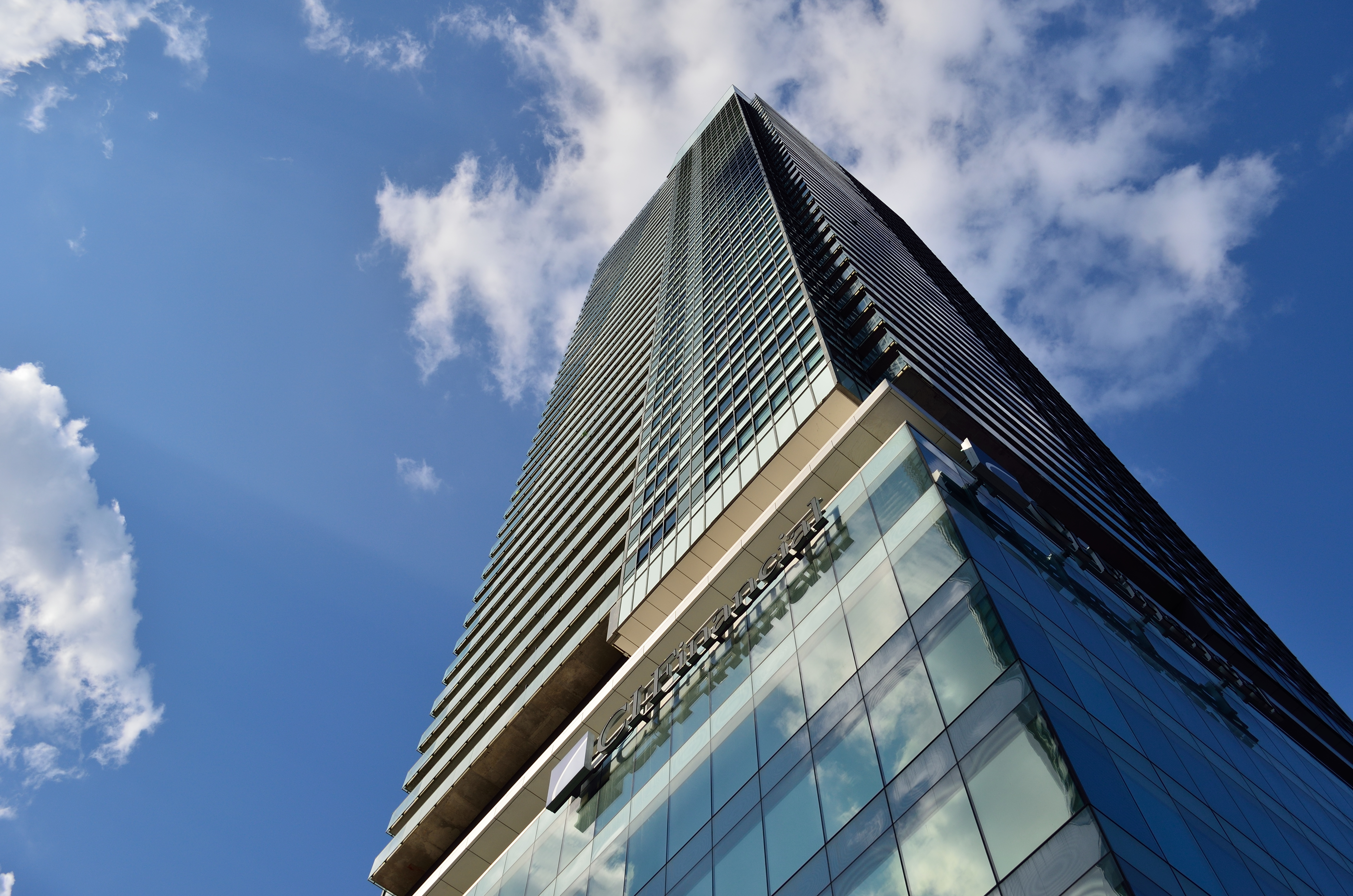
- CI Financial in Toronto
- Type: Private
- Industry: Investment management
- Founded: 1965; 61 years ago (as Universal Savings Fund Management Limited)
- Founder: G. Raymond Chang
- Headquarters: Toronto, Ontario, Canada
- Key people: Kurt MacAlpine (CEO); Amit Muni (CFO); Darie Urbanky (COO)
- AUM: CA$450.0 billion
- Owner: Mubadala Investment Company
- Number of employees: 1,490 (2020)
- Divisions: CI Global Asset Management; CI Assante Wealth Management; CI Direct Investing; CI Investment Services; CI Private Wealth
- Website: www.cifinancial.com

CI Financial is a Canadian investment management company based in Toronto, Ontario. It offers investment management and wealth management services targeted to high net worth retail investors, as well as brokerage and trading services to portfolio managers and institutional investors.

As of 2024, it has a total of $450.0 billion in assets under management and advisement. It was listed on the Toronto Stock Exchange as TSX: CIX, the New York Stock Exchange as NYSE: CIXX and was also a component of the S&P/TSX Composite Index before going private in 2025.

== History ==
CI Financial was founded in 1965 as Universal Savings Fund Management Limited. It was a small private investment firm until 1994, when it held an IPO on the Toronto Stock Exchange as C.I. Fund Management (the C.I. stood for Canadian International). In the next 9 years, it increased in size by 10 times. In 1999, Bill Holland became CEO of the company, a position that he was to hold for more than 10 years. Also in 1999, the company acquired BPI Financial Corp. for $206 million, creating Canada's fifth-largest public mutual fund company. In 2003, CI purchased the Canadian operations of financial firm Assante Corporation. for $846 million. As a result of this acquisition, and two others at the same time, CI became the second largest fund management company in Canada.

CI Financial logo from 2005 to 2020

In 2005, CI changed its name to CI Financial, to reflect the diversity of its activities. In 2007, it acquired Rockwater Capital for $250 million. This deal allowed CI to expand into the investment banking business. In 2008, Sun Life Financial sold its 37% ownership in CI to Scotiabank for $2.3 billion. Scotiabank made the purchase to strengthen its relatively weak wealth management business. Sun Life had held the stake until before 2003. In 2010, CI acquired Hartford Investments' Canadian operations. In 2014, Scotiabank sold most of its stake in CI, in part due to conflicts with the management of the company.

In June 2015, CI achieved $140.4 billion in managing assets surpassing Mackenzie Investments ($136.0 billion) in becoming the largest independent investment management firm in Canada. In November, CI acquired First Asset Capital Corp., allowing it to expand into offering exchange-traded funds.

In November 2016, CI acquired an 80% stake in an Australian investment firm Grant Samuel Funds Management expanding CI's presence in the Australian and New Zealand markets.

In August 2017, CI acquired one of Canada's largest independent investment management firm Sentry Investments for $780 million increasing CI's total assets by 16%. In September, CI acquired BBS Securities Inc., parent company of online brokerage Virtual Brokers, due to its investment in Fintech.

In October 2019, CI acquired a 49% stake in an Australian global equities firm Redpoint Investment Management further expanding CI in the Australian market. In November, CI acquired the Canadian arm of US exchange-traded fund powerhouse WisdomTree Investments. CI maintained the lineup of Wisdomtree ETFs with no changes to their investment objectives or strategies.

In 2020, CI underwent strategic restructuring under the leadership of CEO Kurt MacAlpine. The main division of CI was rebranded to CI Global Asset Management with the merger of former main division CI Investments, and CI First Asset Capital. In house boutiques branding under CI Investments were phased out and will operate under CI Global Asset Management. The affected CI Investment boutique brands were Cambridge Global Asset Management, Harbour Advisors, Sentry Investment Management, and Signature Global Asset Management. CI's wealth management division Assante Wealth Management was renamed CI Assante Wealth Management. CI acquired the remaining minority 25% stake in WealthBar allowing the creation of the new division CI Direct Investing. CI Direct Investing was introduced with the merger of WealthBar and Virtual Brokers. CI's broker dealer BBS Securities was renamed CI Investment Services. CI's Stonegate Private Counsel alongside CI's U.S. RIA businesses formed CI Private Wealth.

In June 2026, CI Global Asset Management acquired Invesco Canada's investment fund business, becoming manager of 98 mutual funds and exchange-traded funds with approximately C$27 billion in assets under management.

In July 2025, CI Financial announced that it had received all regulatory approvals required to complete a take-private transaction under a plan of arrangement with Mubadala Capital. In August 2025, CI Financial was acquired by the state-owned Emirati Mubadala Investment Company and turned private. Under the terms of the transaction, shareholders were to receive C$32.00 per share in cash, representing a premium of 33% over the last closing price and 58% over the 60-day volume-weighted average trading price.

In August 2026, CI Global Asset Management agreed to sell its Australian investment fund management affiliate GSFM to Munro Partners in exchange for an increased minority interest in Munro.

== Divisions ==
CI Financial operates as a banner for its many operating divisions.

- CI Global Asset Management (Formerly CI Investments): The main division of CI, offering mutual funds, ETFs, private pools (private funds), and alternative investments (hedge funds and private equity)
- CI Assante Wealth Management: Wealth management services
- CI Direct Investing: Online brokerage, wealth management, and financial planning services
- CI Investment Services: Broker Dealer that provides brokerage and trading services to portfolio managers, introducing brokers and institutional investors
- CI Private Wealth: Private wealth management services targeted to high net worth investors

== Major investments ==
- Grant Samuel Funds Management (80%): Investment firm that offers funds and investment strategies
- Marret Asset Management (65%): Investment firm that specializes in fixed income and alternative investment strategies
- Redpoint Investment Management (49%): Global equities firm offering active equity funds and infrastructure funds

== Mergers and acquisitions ==
Firm	Year Established	Year of Amalgamation	Merged Into
BPI Financial Corp	1993	1999	CI Global Asset Management (CI Investments)
Assante Corp	1995	2003	CI Assante Wealth Management (Assante Wealth Management)
Synergy Asset Management	1997	2003	CI Global Asset Management (CI Investments)
Rockwater Capital	1995	2007	CI Global Asset Management (CI Investments)
Hartford Investments	2000	2010	CI Global Asset Management (CI Investments)
First Asset Capital	2000	2015	CI Global Asset Management (CI First Asset)
Sentry Investments	1997	2017	CI Global Asset Management (CI Investments)
BBS Securities	2008	2017	CI Investment Services (BBS Securities)
Wealthbar	2014	2020	CI Direct Investing
Balasa Dinverno Foltz	2001	2020	CI Private Wealth
Doyle Wealth Management	2005	2020	CI Private Wealth
Robertson, Griege & Thoele Wealth Advisors	1985	2020	CI Private Wealth
The Roosevelt Investment Group	1971	2020	CI Private Wealth
Segall Bryant & Hamill	1994	2021	CI Private Wealth
Barrett Asset Management	1937	2021	CI Private Wealth

== Controversy ==
In 2004, the Ontario Securities Commission (OSC) approved settlement agreements with CI Investments and three other fund companies. As part of the settlement, CI Investments agreed to make a payment of $49.3 million to investors in its mutual funds that were affected by market timing trades carried out by third party investors in certain mutual funds managed by CI Investments.

In 2016, CI reached a no-contest settlement with the OSC to pay $156 million to 360,000 investors in its mutual funds. The settlement was due to CI Investments miscalculating the net asset value of certain funds, by not properly accounting for interest earned from 2009 to 2015. CI Investments also paid an $8 million voluntary payment to the commission. This settlement agreement resulted in the largest amount of compensation paid to investors pursuant to a no-contest settlement agreement in Ontario.
