= University of the Air (CBC radio series) =

Canadian educational radio series

University of the Air was an educational radio programme produced by the Canadian Broadcasting Corporation from the late 1950s until 1965, consisting of recorded lectures on various subjects.

In 1965, both this programme and another CBC radio programme, The Learning Stage, were replaced in favour of a new show, Ideas, which is still broadcast on CBC Radio One.

== See also ==
- University of the Air (TV series), which began on CTV in 1966, although there is otherwise no known association with the CBC radio series.
