= City of Toronto Heritage Property Inventory =

List of heritage properties

The City of Toronto's Heritage Property Inventory is a list of buildings, structures, and properties in Toronto that are identified by the city, for the purposes of preserving their original facades and appearances. The inclusion of any property on the Inventory is a clear statement that the city is seeking the long-term preservation of the heritage attributes of a given property. The list has reached the 8000-property mark, and continues to grow as properties in Toronto reach maturation. Approximately 4,500 of the included properties are designated under the Ontario Heritage Act.

== Designation versus Listing ==
Despite the often interchangeable use of the terms "designated" or "listed", the two terms denote very different statuses on the Heritage Property Inventory.

== Listed properties ==
A property owner may choose to voluntarily list their property on the Inventory, which would only allow the Heritage Preservation Services body to review any future development and building applications affecting those properties. Owners of listed properties are also required to give the City of Toronto at least 60 days notice of their intention to demolish the property. The aim of being listed is to ensure that buildings that do not yet fit the criteria for protection under any of the city's heritage by-laws would still be considered as "protectable", if the city believed there were reasonable grounds to prevent any amendments to the property's appearance or structure. Being listed is similar to being on a watch-list, as it provides enough oversight and awareness to the City of Toronto's heritage bodies, that they could protest demolition or drastic change to such properties, by attending a public zoning application hearing.

== Designated properties ==
Unlike being "listed", a designation confers a legal status on a property by a specific by-law under the Ontario Heritage Act. Designation gives Toronto City Council the legal authority to refuse any application that would adversely affect the property's heritage attributes. There are two categories for designation under the Ontario Heritage Act: Part IV (individual property designation) or Part V (Heritage Conservation District designation). The Ontario Heritage Trust, which is an Ontario Ministry of Tourism and Culture agency, is responsible for protecting any designated properties from drastic change or demolition.

== Heritage grants ==
The City of Toronto Heritage Grant Program provides funds of up to 50% of the estimated cost of conserving the aesthetic of designated heritage properties. Funds are provided to owners of properties designated under Parts IV or V of the Ontario Heritage Act. Intended projects may qualify for funding if criteria for eligibility for heritage conservation work in either of the two project categories is met:

- Residential house form buildings - up to a maximum grant of $10,000.00 for individual properties.
- Commercial, institutional, multi-residential and industrial form buildings.

== See also ==
- City of Toronto government
- List of oldest buildings and structures in Toronto
