= Joe Fresh =

Fashion brand of the Loblaw Companies

- Product type: Apparel, footwear, accessories, beauty and cosmetics
- Current owner: Loblaw Companies
- Country: Toronto, Canada
- Introduced: 2006; 20 years ago
- Markets: Canada; United States; UAE; South Korea; Philippines; Saudi Arabia; Jordan; Lebanon; Egypt; Morocco; Algeria; Macedonia; Montenegro; Croatia; Bosnia; Kazakhstan; Azerbaijan; Georgia; Belarus; Armenia; Serbia; Spain
- Tagline: Fresh style. Fresh price.
- Website: www.joefresh.com

Joe Fresh is a Canadian fashion brand and retail chain created by designer Joe Mimran for Canadian food distributor Loblaw Companies Limited. It was formed in 2006. The label includes adult and children's wear, shoes, handbags, jewellery, beauty products, and bath items.

Joe Fresh entered the United States market, with permanent and pop-up stores, in New York City and the surrounding region, with an international flagship store located at 510 Fifth Avenue. In 2012, the brand also appeared in approximately 680 JCPenney stores throughout the United States.

The JCPenney agreement was dismantled in 2015, with the companies making the decision not to renew their existing distribution agreement, which expired on January 30, 2016. The Fifth Avenue store closed in 2015.

== History ==
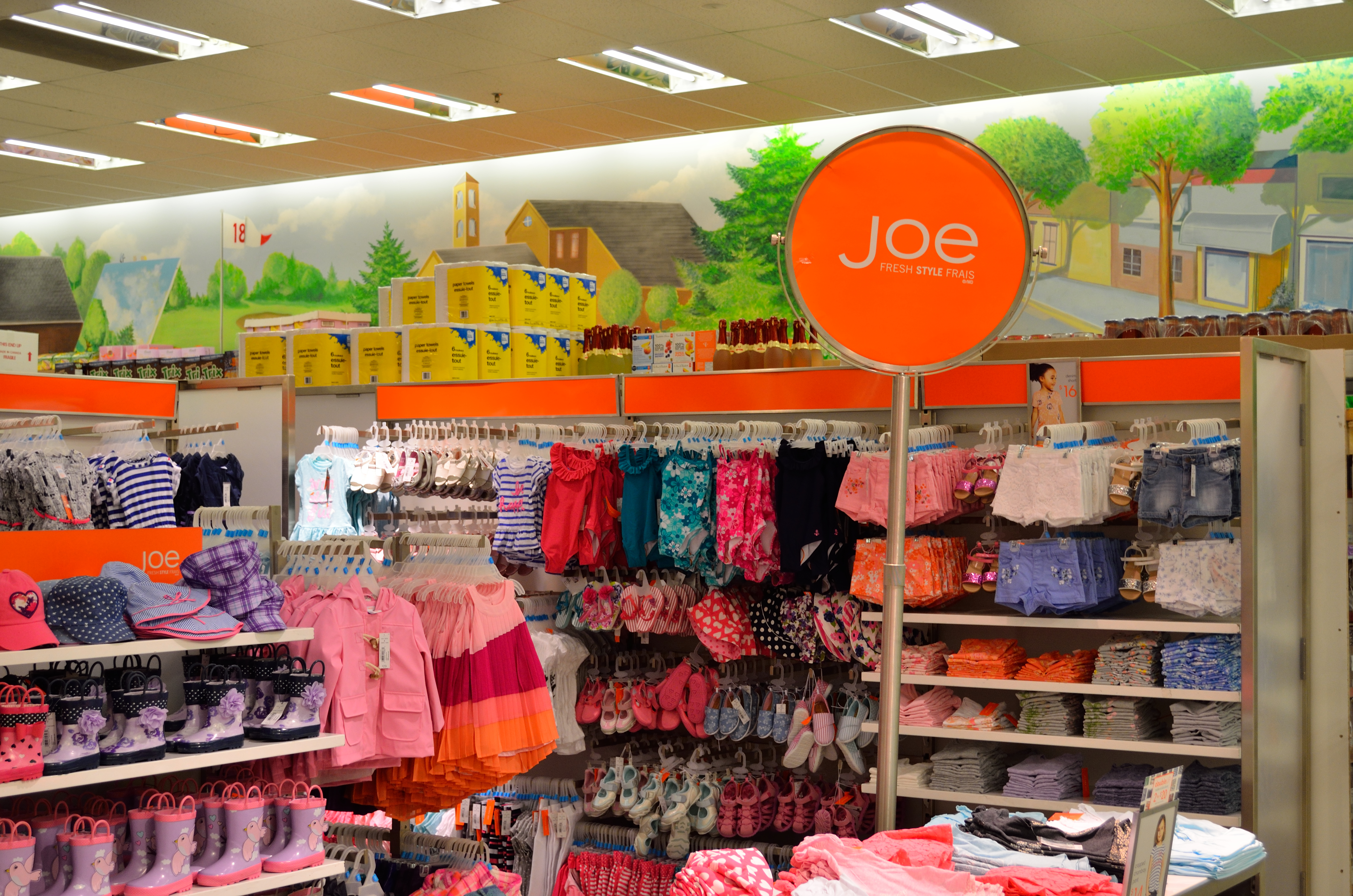
Inside a Joe Fresh store.

=== Concept ===
In 2004, Loblaw approached Joe Mimran, a co-founder of the Club Monaco retail chain and the name behind the Alfred Sung brand, with the idea of creating a new fashion line. Mimran had previously worked with Loblaw in developing its President's Choice Home Collection of merchandise. While the company had offered children's clothing in its superstores, it had never targeted the adult market.

"We had no idea what the consumer would want from a food store; we had no idea whether the prices would resonate, whether they wanted casual dress versus something dressier. Everything that was done at that time, we did it really without very much research. We just said let's build a line, let's design the stores, the marketing, the [rounded dollar] price points. We went with bright colours and tasty colours because it was a food store, and all of these things were all done intuitively, and it worked."

Mimran noted that both "integrity of product design" and a "killer price point" were key, along with the practical considerations associated with selling a clothing line in a supermarket, since both the retail environment and merchandise "had to stand up to the wear and tear of shopping carts and the traffic flow."

=== Launch ===
In March 2006, the fashion brand, named Joe Fresh Style, debuted at 40 Real Canadian Superstore and Atlantic Superstore locations. News reports described the launch as "a big gamble" for both the food retailer and designer. The branding represented for the first time Mimran's name appearing on one of his labels. "Now, Mr. Mimran is finally being thrust into the public spotlight, becoming a brand in his own right." The use of "Joe", according to Mimran, was a deliberate decision that gave the private label "instant credibility." Meanwhile, "Fresh" not only drew an association with the supermarkets where the clothes would be sold but also the line's simple design.

One retail analyst expressed the view that consumers would be more likely to buy based on the line's style and in-store retail convenience rather than price point.

=== Sales ===
Seven months after the brand's launch, Loblaw reported that sales had exceeded the company's own projections: "Every one of our sales objectives that we have set, we have surpassed," noted Louise Drouin, senior vice president of general merchandise. Mimran also expressed his personal satisfaction with the brand's acceptance among consumers. "I've been involved with many projects over the years, and I can tell you the response to this has been overwhelming." But retail consultant, Dalan Bronson of the J.C. Williams Group, was more cautious, contending that the jury was still out on the brand's long-term prospects, given the fickle nature of the fashion trade.

=== Product line ===
In 2007, Loblaw began expanding the line to include sleepwear, lingerie, and children's wear, "and quickly became the top seller of kid's clothing in the country." Swimwear and sunglasses were added in 2008, and in 2009 Joe Fresh Beauty debuted with an array of reasonably priced cosmetics at $8 or less. By then, the brand had become the second-biggest-selling clothing label in the country, according to market research. A Maclean's magazine article noted Joe's appeal amongst a wide range of consumers:

Since its inception, Joe Fresh has been a smash hit with suburban soccer moms. But experts have been a little surprised by how many young urbanites, regulars at Holt Renfrew and other high-priced boutiques, are willing to snap up $29 cable-knit sweaters and $49 skirts without the slightest hint of shame. Many, in fact, openly boast to friends about their great finds.

Within its first year and a half, Joe Fresh had chalked up $400 million in retail sales.

=== Expansion ===
In 2010, Joe Fresh moved beyond the supermarket aisle with the opening of its first stand-alone store, located in downtown Vancouver. Months later, Loblaw announced its intent to open 20 dedicated outlets across Canada, 6 to be completed by year's end. Although media reports speculated that the brand would remain strictly a Canadian phenomenon, in 2011, Loblaw announced its most ambitious plans yet for Joe Fresh – four retail outlets slated for metropolitan New York City with "an international flagship store" on Fifth Avenue. Mimran declared it the right move at the right time. "We felt it was time to make the first step into the international market with a store in the American fashion capital, and one of the most exciting cities in the world, New York." But in confirming the brand's entry into the American market, Loblaw president Allan Leighton pointed out that it was "very much a pilot project." One retail analyst, Kaileen Millard-Ruff of market researcher Synovate Canada, referred to the opportunities and pitfalls faced by Canadian retailers who head south of the border in hopes of staking a claim:

"Joe Fresh definitely has an opportunity there, and the U.S. is looking for more cheap chic," she said. "And the designs don't look cheap, they look more sophisticated. It all comes down to whether Loblaw will put in the cash to do it properly, because in New York you have to look like a big thing to be a big thing... that's everything on execution from the space, to product, to fixtures, to lighting. Fifth Avenue is not the cheapest real estate around."

But while Loblaw management was cautious in tone regarding Joe's entry into the American market, Mimran spoke ambitiously, envisioning as many as 800 stores across the U.S. in five years, with the possibility of taking the label beyond North America, into Europe and Asia. He noted that Joe Fresh already competes successfully with international brands at home in Canada. "Today, if you have a proposition that resonates, it can work across cultures and borders." Mimran also expressed the view that considering the enormous sales volume of the brand in Canada, to not attempt an entry into the United States market and beyond would be a matter of "short-changing ourselves."

=== New York ===
In July 2011, New Yorkers were given a sneak preview of Joe Fresh fashion with the opening of a 600-square-foot pop-up summer store, replete with a wall display of brightly colored flip-flops, at the Long Island resort of East Hampton Village. New York City's first glimpse of Joe followed in the fall with the October opening of a temporary "holiday store" on Madison Avenue. But it was with the unveiling of stores at Bridgewater and Garden City, that Joe began ringing in sales at its first permanent U.S. outlets. New York City's first permanent Joe Fresh store, located in Manhattan's Flatiron District, opened in November 2011. Mimran, present for the grand opening of a new Joe Fresh boutique at 110 Fifth Avenue, acknowledged the crowded nature of the New York's low-price high fashion market, but contended there's always a place for a new player with integrity:

The fashion industry allows newcomers. This is not an exclusionary industry. I think if you get beat it's not because of the competition, it's because you are not good enough. Women do love to shop around, and they like to have a handful of brands that they like to frequent. It's not about one single brand. This is not the computer business, it's the fashion game. There isn't one department store, there isn't one specialty store. And what we've shown, especially in Canada, is we can play with international competition. So why can't we do it here?

Joe's new international flagship headquarters, located on Fifth Avenue and 43rd Street, opened in the spring of 2012. The New York ad campaign featured the slogan, "Irresistible fashion for Everyone. Affordable fashion for Anyone."

In July 2012, it was announced that Joe Fresh and JCPenney were teaming up to open close to 700 Joe stores in the retailer's outlets throughout the United States. Mimran described the move as "akin to a roll-out but done very quickly" and noted that it would give Joe Fresh national exposure. March 2013 saw the launch of 681 Joe Fresh stores throughout JCPenney locations. The brand also became available online, featured on the JCPenney website.

== Issues ==
On 24 April 2013, an eight-story commercial building called Rana Plaza collapsed in Savar, a sub-district near Dhaka, the capital of Bangladesh. At least 1,127 people died and over 2,438 were injured. The building housed a number of separate garment factories employing around 5,000 people, several shops, a bank, and manufactured apparel for brands including the Benetton Group, Joe Fresh, The Children's Place, Primark, Monsoon, and Dressbarn. The parent company of Joe Fresh, Loblaws, offered compensation to the victims of three months' pay, totalling about $150 plus undisclosed long-term compensation. It has established a $3 million trust to compensate victims of the accident. Joe Fresh continues to manufacture its garments in Bangladesh, with one source stating that as of 2014 it has doubled production in the country. In 2014, Loblaws finally hired an employee to oversee its Bangladeshi operations and monitor working conditions. In 2015, a class action lawsuit asking for $1.85 billion in damages was filed against Loblaws alleging Loblaws was aware of the poor safety standards of Rana Plaza.

== See also ==
- List of Canadian clothing store chains
