= Tevrow + Chase =

Women's clothing company

- Company type: Private
- Industry: Fashion
- Founded: 2005
- Founder: Joe Mimran; Paul Sinclaire
- Defunct: 2009
- Key people: Paul Sinclaire (Creative director); Paige Ring (Fashion Designer)

Tevrow + Chase was an international womenswear company, with offices in Toronto and New York. The brand was best known for its "high-profile" following, which included Oprah Winfrey and Gwen Stefani

== History ==
Tevrow + Chase was founded in 2005 by former Vogue editor Paul Sinclaire and Club Monaco founder Joseph Mimran.

The name is a combination of middle names from Mimran's youngest daughter and Sinclaire's own middle name.

Sinclaire had previously worked as a designer under Mimran at Club Monaco. and it was the first collaboration between the two since the brand was purchased.

The company was known for making apparel in North America, which halted along with the closing of its Toronto flagship store in 2008. The company ceased operations shortly after, in 2009.

== The Design ==
The brand's day-to-day oversight was executed by Paul Sinclaire, who served as creative director. The company's fashion designer was Paige Ring, who transferred her minimal look into painting.

Despite being based out of Canada, the brand wasn't focused on Canadian sales, limiting distribution to one brand was designed for American consumers and sold in high end US department stores like Saks Fifth Avenue and Neiman Marcus.

== Critical acclaim ==
Despite its short life, Tevrow + Chase managed to become a celebrity favorite. The brand's pants were featured as one of Oprah's Favorite Things, and one of the company's striped-shirts was prominently worn by Stefani in "The Sweet Escape" music video.
