= Simon Chang =

Simon Chang may refer to:

- Simon Chang (designer), Chinese-Canadian women's fashion designer
- Simon Chang (politician) (born 1954), Premier of the Republic of China
