= Joe Mimran =

Canadian fashion designer

- Born: Joseph Mimran; 2 December 1952 (age 73); Casablanca, Casablanca-Settat, Morocco
- Education: University of Windsor; York University
- Occupation: Fashion designer
- Known for: Joe Fresh; Club Monaco; Tevrow + Chase
- Spouse(s): Sharon Mimran (divorced) Kimberly Newport (m. 2000)
- Children: 4

Joseph Mimran (born 2 December 1952) is a Canadian fashion designer and entrepreneur, best known for founding the Club Monaco and Joe Fresh brands. He was also an investor on the Dragons' Den television series.

== Early life ==
Mimran was born in Casablanca, Morocco, to Eli and Esther Mimran, who are both Jewish. In 1957, the family, including Joe and brother Saul, moved to Canada and settled in Forest Hill, Toronto.

Esther Mimran, Joseph’s mother, was a couturier in Morocco and introduced him to design at an early age. Esther dressed her family in made-to-measure suits inspired by Hollywood's leading men (including a houndstooth suit Mimran had seen Sean Connery wear in a James Bond film at the age of 12). She also ran a small business outfitting Toronto socialites from her home studio.

Mimran's first job was to deliver groceries from his father's grocery store to neighbourhood residents but his interest in design took him to the sales floor of a small knitting mill where he explored the process of negotiation. At the age of 18, Mimran opened a small art gallery while completing his Bachelor of Arts degree at York University, where he majored in sociology and fine art. In 1975, he attended the University of Windsor, where he completed a B.Com. degree. He later earned his CPA. After graduation he worked as an accountant.

== Career ==
=== First businesses ===
In 1976, Mimran's brother Saul purchased a small factory in the heart of Toronto's garment district to expand the family-run dressmaking business so they could produce Esther's designs on a larger scale. Mimran left his accounting job nine months later and joined the business to head up operations, manufacturing and finance. The dress-making business became Ms. Originals, specializing in women's separates including suits and pants. Mimran had quickly realized that there was a new demand for tailored work wear for women, and catching on to the right trend at the right time led to the company's success.

Mimran became increasingly interested in the business of design and branding. In 1979 he set out, with brother Saul, to develop a new line with a more modern aesthetic. They hired Alfred Sung, a Canadian designer whose line, Moon, had caught their eye to design this new endeavour. In 1981, they launched Alfred Sung. The Alfred Sung collection quickly took off as the trio opened stores across North America. In 1983 a Maclean's magazine cover story declared Alfred Sung "The New King of Fashion." In the early ‘90s the Alfred Sung name was licensed to Etac and they introduced several new product lines including fragrance, eyewear, jewellery, homeware, bridal wear and menswear. After Etac filed for bankruptcy, the line faltered for a few years (though kept a strong foothold in the fragrance marketplace) before being revived along with Moon, in collaboration with The Bay in the mid-00s. By this time Mimran had left the Mimran Group to focus on a new business, Club Monaco.

=== Club Monaco ===
By the mid-1980s, Mimran had developed a new business idea and felt ready to take the lead on design. Unable to find a plain, white cotton shirt he decided to make one. Club Monaco, by the newly formed Monaco Group, was developed as a line of minimalist basics. Mimran led this new brand, while Saul focused on the Alfred Sung business.

When The Bay and Eaton's department stores both passed on the collection, partly because they did not understand the minimal, unisex design, Mimran decided to open his own shop. A space was selected on Queen St W. in Toronto, where Club Monaco sold everything from coats to underwear in one 5,000-square-foot (460 m^{2}) space. A teaser campaign preceded the store opening and there was a line up to get into the store on opening day in September 1985.

In 1986 the company went public, then private again in 1989 with Dylex as a partner. A flagship store opened in New York City on Fifth Avenue in 1995 which remains today. The brand cut back its growth for a short period during the recession in the 1990s and focused its colour palette to neutrals including black and white. The concept, which saved on cost, led to the surprising revitalization of the label.

In 1999 Mimran created Caban, a lifestyle store based on the clean Club Monaco aesthetic. In 1996 the company went public once again. By 1999, Club Monaco had 125 stores worldwide including Canada, the United States, Japan and South Korea. That same year, the Polo Ralph Lauren Corp. purchased both Club Monaco and Caban. Mimran stayed on as president and CEO to see the company through the transition but left shortly after to focus on other projects.

=== Joseph Mimran & Associates ===
After leaving Club Monaco, Mimran began to invest in emerging businesses. He re-opened his design consulting firm, Joseph Mimran & Associates.

With his wife Kimberley Newport-Mimran as lead-designer, Mimran launched Pink Tartan in 2002. The women's ready-to-wear collection is sold at upscale department stores such as Holt Renfrew and Saks Fifth Avenue and through their own flagship store in Toronto's Yorkville area.

In 2006, he collaborated with friend Paul Sinclaire (formally of Club Monaco and Vogue) on a clothing collection called Tevrow + Chase.

Mimran began designing the President's Choice Home collection for Loblaw Companies Limited in 2002. The Weston family, who own Loblaw, also asked him to design a private label collection for another business of theirs, Holt Renfrew. In 2010, Loblaw asked Mimran to consult on all of the non-food, general merchandise sold in their stores. Joseph Mimran & Associates now oversees the design of all apparel, home and entertainment for Loblaw Companies Limited.

Joseph Mimran & Associates currently employs a team of 200 who work from three offices in Toronto's Liberty Village.

=== Joe Fresh ===
In 2004, Mimran was approached to develop a private-label apparel line to sell in Loblaw Companies superstores and supermarkets across Canada. Joe Fresh Style was launched in the spring of 2006.

Brand extensions were quickly added including kids apparel, intimates and sleepwear in 2007, swimwear and sunglasses in 2008, cosmetics and bath in 2009, and nail polish in 2010. The brand also embarked on some special projects including designing the ushers outfits for the opening and closing ceremonies of the Vancouver Olympics, an apparel partnership with Barbie and re-designing the Scouts Canada uniforms.

With no more room in Loblaw grocery stores, and increasing demand from a fashion-forward customer, Joe Fresh began to open free-standing stores. The first flagship store opened on Granville St in Vancouver in 2010, and a store in New York City was opened in 2011.

In March 2016, Joe Fresh founder and ambassador Joe Mimran retired. Mario Grauso, who was named chief operating officer of Joe Fresh in 2013, took over.

=== Dip ===
In July 2018, Mimran worked with Kroger to unify their private-label fashion brands under the Dip label.

=== Staples partnership ===
In 2019, Joe created and launched gry mattr with Staples Canada, a collection of home and office accessories that live at the intersection of work and life. His lifelong commitment to beauty and design inspired his objective to bring well designed and affordable products into the hands of the masses. The inaugural gry mattr collection includes blue light glasses and eyewear, office organizers, technology and iPhone accessories, drinkware, stationery, décor. It later included office chairs.

Mimran launched another line of products with Staples, General Supply Goods + Co.

=== Other ===
In 2021, Mimran opened an Italian Restaurant, Quadro Ristorante, in Toronto's Little Italy. He partnered with Tony Longo of Centro and INK Entertainment Group to launch the 33,000 square foot space.

== Family life ==
Mimran has three children with interior designer Sharon Mimran; they divorced in 1996. In 2000, Mimran married Kimberley Newport, who was a merchandiser for Club Monaco. The couple has a daughter, Jacqueline Mimran, who was born in 2001.
