= Boutique La Vie en Rose =

Canadian lingerie retailer

Boutique La Vie en Rose Inc.
- Type: Private
- Industry: Retail
- Founded: 1984; 42 years ago
- Founders: Harry Kaner; Rosmary Kaner
- Headquarters: Montreal, Quebec, Canada
- Number of locations: 150 Canadian stores, 56 international locations (September 2011)
- Key people: François Roberge (Chairman and CEO 1996-present)
- Products: Lingerie, sleepwear, swimwear, loungewear
- Website: www.lavieenrose.com

Boutique La Vie en Rose Inc. is a Canadian lingerie retailer headquartered in Montreal, Quebec. The brand produces and sells a range of undergarments, sleepwear, and swimwear aimed at women in the 25-55 age group. Since 2003, La Vie en Rose also offered underwear, sleepwear, loungewear and swimwear for men under the brand name "La Vie en Rose MAN". In 2016, the company launched a new line for men called "LV96". As of September 2017, La Vie en Rose has permanently stopped offering products for men, explaining that "In order to focus on women's comfort and well-being, we will no longer carry our men's collection".

As of April 2019, the company has over 190 stores throughout Canada as well as 56 international locations including a large presence in the Middle East particularly in Saudi Arabia, where the company has 25 stores, and the United Arab Emirates. The most recent Canadian addition is a store in Brandon, Manitoba. The most recent international addition is a store in Astana, Kazakhstan which opened in January 2011. The company has plans to expand to ten new countries by 2013 which is set to include locations in India, China, Australia and Georgia.

== History ==
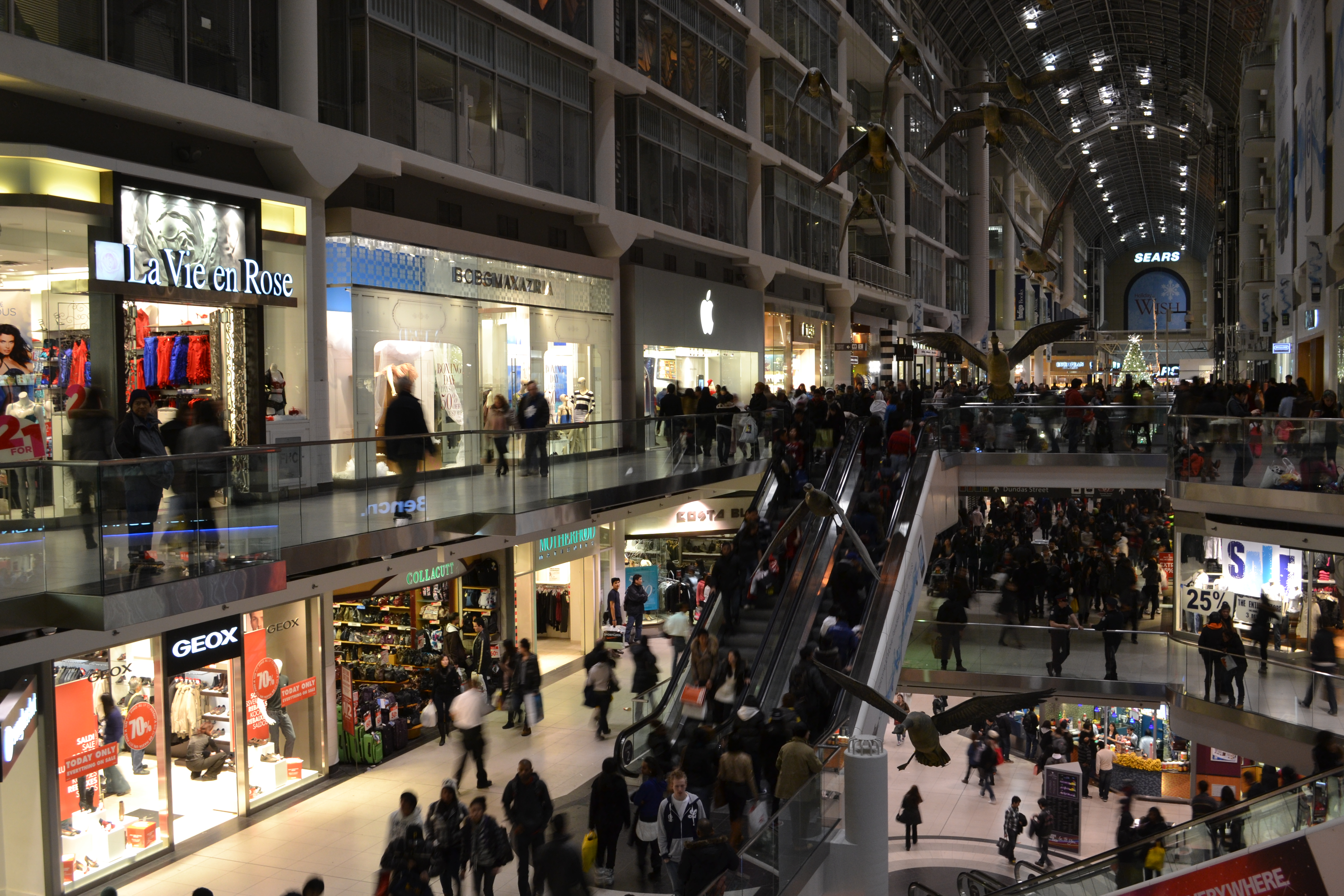
La Vie en Rose in Toronto Eaton Centre, with Geox, BCBGMAXAZRIA, Apple Store, Collacutt, Motherhood Maternity, Costa Blanca, and other stores. Sears can be seen far out.

La Vie en Rose was founded in 1984 by a Toronto businessman Harry Kaner in collaboration with his wife Rosmary Kaner. The first store opened in the summer of 1985 at Toronto's Sherway Gardens shopping mall, with intention of becoming the first of a chain which would include upwards of eight stores. Aimed at the increasing working women market, the company sought to offer a "personal service robe in each changing room and a well trained staff." However, the first three years of operation did not happen as intended and the company filed for bankruptcy protection before Kaner sold it to the Algo Group in 1987.

In 1996, after more years of losses, Algo sold the company for $2.4 million to entrepreneur François Roberge, who had previous experience working in the industry. Roberge financed the sale primarily from loans and personal savings, and secured 23 of the company's 26 stores—which were at the time losing a million dollars a year. When it was acquired, the company's head office, located in Toronto, employed only 12 people and Roberge made the choice to relocate the head office from Toronto to downtown Montreal. The first year under new ownership proved profitable and shortly after La Vie en Rose started opening stores annually.

There are currently 150 stores throughout Canada, which employ around 2,000 people nationwide, including three concept stores: La Vie en Rose, La Vie en Rose Aqua, and La Vie en Rose Outlet. As of September 2011, the chain now counts 150 boutiques nationwide. The company brings in $130 million in domestic sales from its Canadian stores, as well as $10 million from 56 international locations.

At the beginning of December 2011, the company acquired 11 stores from Ainsi Soit-Elle, a Quebec lingerie retailer. The stores were reopened by the end of January 2012.

In 2015, the company acquired the Bikini Village chain of swimsuit stores, saving it from bankruptcy.

== Products ==
The brand produces and sells a range of lingerie, sleepwear, loungewear, and swimwear aimed at women of all ages. The company is considered to be on the low- to mid-range of luxury brands with products that cater toward all women.

== International ==
In 2004, La Vie en Rose expanded internationally into the Middle Eastern market when they opened a store in Saudi Arabia. Having seen a positive results from the venture, the company has increased their operation in the region opening 56 boutiques with additional locations in Lebanon, the United Arab Emirates, Jordan, Egypt, Kuwait and Algeria. Saudi Arabia is the largest international asset for the company with 25 stores currently in operation. The United Arab Emirates has the second largest number of stores outside of Canada, after Saudi Arabia, with a total of ten stores, nine in Dubai and one Abu Dhabi. The most recent La Vie en Rose location opened January 2011 in Astana, Kazakhstan and as of September 2011 plans are underway expand to an additional 10 new countries by 2013 which is set to include India, China, Azerbaijan and Georgia. Australia's first store is set to be in Adelaide.
