= Kotn =

Canadian clothing retailer

Kotn, Inc.
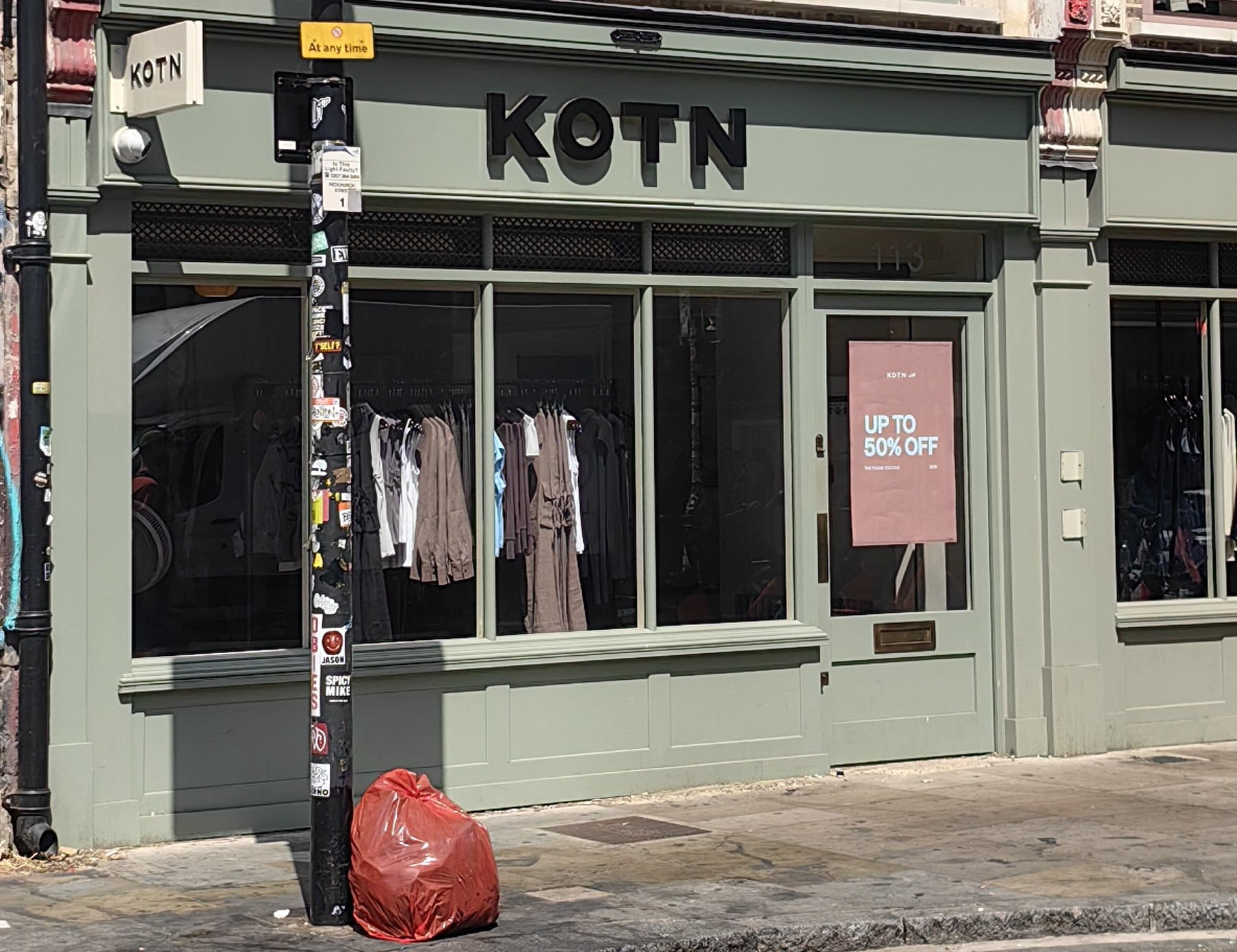
- Industry: Retail
- Founded: 2015
- Founders: Benjamin Sehl; Mackenzie Yeates; Rami Helali
- Headquarters: Toronto, Ontario, Canada
- Area served: Canada, USA, UK
- Products: Women's and Men's: Clothing, accessories
- Website: kotn.com

Kotn is a Canadian clothing retailer that sells both online and in their own retail stores in Toronto, Montreal, London, and Vancouver. During her time working at the luxury department store Holt Renfrew, Mackenzie Yeates noticed the lack of ethical options available to the wider market. The business is based on the idea of providing middle market sustainable clothing. The company is headquartered in Toronto, Canada.

== Awards ==
In 2018, founders Benjamin Sehl, Mackenzie Yeates, and Rami Helali were included in Forbes' 30 Under 30 in the category "Retail & Ecommerce."

In 2019, Kotn won the Canadian Arts and Fashion Awards Sustainability Award for the organization's work building schools for its farmers' children in Egypt.
