= Alfred Sung =

Canadian fashion designer

Alfred Sung (born 14 June 1948) is a Canadian fashion designer and businessman. He is well known for producing apparel, fragrance, accessories and home fashions for women and men. He was born in Shanghai and raised in Hong Kong. Sung is the brother of late Hong Kong actress Lydia Shum. He is also a founder of Club Monaco, a mid-priced, high-end casual clothing retailer.

== Early life ==
Sung aspired to become a fine artist contrary to his parents' wishes that he pursues a traditional profession. In time, his father compromised and agreed to send him to Paris where he studied couture at the notable Chambre Syndicale de la Couture Parisienne.

After graduating with first-place honours, Sung moved to New York City to study at the Parsons School of Design. Upon completion, he began the task of honing his talent while working as an assistant designer for a Seventh Avenue dress manufacturer.

== Career ==
=== Early career ===
In 1972, Alfred Sung moved to Canada. His next step was designing for a sportswear manufacturer in Toronto's garment district. After using his fashion illustration skills to supplement his income, Sung opened a tiny shop called Moon initially located on Carlton St. just east of Sherbourne in Toronto's Cabbagetown area around 1977. His loose fitting and comfortable desert colour designs were a major contrast to the black leather and skinny jeans of the prevailing Punk scene.

=== Monaco Group Inc. ===
In 1980, Sung joined forces with Saul Mimran and Joseph Mimran to create Monaco Group Inc., the corporate entity that would develop the Alfred Sung brand and the ready-to-wear collection directed to working women. Within months, the Alfred Sung brand appeared in major department and specialty stores across Canada. In 1981, the Alfred Sung label was launched in the United States through Saks Fifth Avenue, later appearing in Macy's, Nordstrom, Neiman Marcus and Bergdorf Goodman. That same year, Sung opened his first freestanding store in Toronto's Hazelton Lanes. In 1983, Canada's national news magazine, Maclean's, proclaimed Alfred Sung as Canada's "King of Fashion."

=== Fragrance ===
In 1986, with the launch of Parfums Alfred Sung, the Sung trademark its profile by becoming a fragrance brand. Sung by Alfred Sung, the first ladies' perfume launched in 1986, was followed by Shi Alfred Sung in 2001 and Alfred Sung Paradise in 2003. In 2005 a new signature fragrance, Jewel Alfred Sung was launched.

=== Licensing ===
In 1991, Sung opened a new set of free-standing stores across Canada which housed his premium denim collection for men and women, titled "Alfred." During the same year, Monaco Group Inc changed its name to Mimran Group Inc. Following the success of his ready-to-wear lines, Sung developed a bridal collection sold at specialty boutiques across North America and increased the licensing of his name in several categories, including men's suiting and fragrances, eyewear, watches, furs, luggage and leather goods.

Alfred Sung and the Mimrans have embarked on an aggressive fashion licensing campaign unprecedented in the Canadian fashion industry. The Alfred Sung licensed product lines include fragrance, eyewear, sunglasses, watches, bridal, jewelry and fashion accessories, men's clothing and accessories, among others. In 2005 the Alfred Sung Home collection was launched exclusively through Zellers-HBC in Canada, and includes furniture, bedding, bath, home decor, tabletop and kitchen products. This followed by the PURE ALFRED SUNG launch in 2009 also at Zellers-HBC, which included women's ready-to-wear and accessories.

== Club Monaco ==
In 1985, Canadian Joe Mimran, Saul Mimran and Alfred Sung opened the first store in Toronto on Queen Street West. This store, which exists today, originally included a cafe below the sales floor. The first US store opened in Santa Monica in 1989. Until 1999, Club Monaco was a Canadian company and was based at Bloor Street West and Avenue Road in Toronto. Ralph Lauren Corporation acquired Club Monaco in 1999. Ralph Lauren allowed Club Monaco to exist as an independent entity within the group and downplayed its ownership of the brand.

In May 2021, Ralph Lauren announced it would sell its Club Monaco brand to Los Angeles based private equity firm Regent LP. This transaction was completed the following month.
