= Simon Chang (designer) =

Canadian fashion designer

- Born: August 3, 1947 (age 78); Guangzhou, China
- Education: Emily Carr University of Art and Design
- Awards: Order of Canada, 2008; Queen Jubilee Award, 2013

Simon Chang CM is a women's fashion designer, currently residing in Montreal, Quebec, Canada. In 2008, the designer was honored by Governor General Michaëlle Jean with the Order of Canada "for his contributions to the fashion industry as well as for his philanthropic and social engagement".

== Biography ==
Of Chinese descent, Simon was raised in Vancouver, British Columbia. He attended Emily Carr University of Art and Design on a full scholarship awarded by The Hudson’s Bay Company.

After deciding to pursue a career in women's fashion, Simon Chang completed over 300 women's wear collections, from eyewear, to bathing suits, to uniforms.
