= Club Monaco =

Canadian casual clothing retailer

Coordinates: 40°45′5.2″N 74°00′23.2″W

Club Monaco Corp.

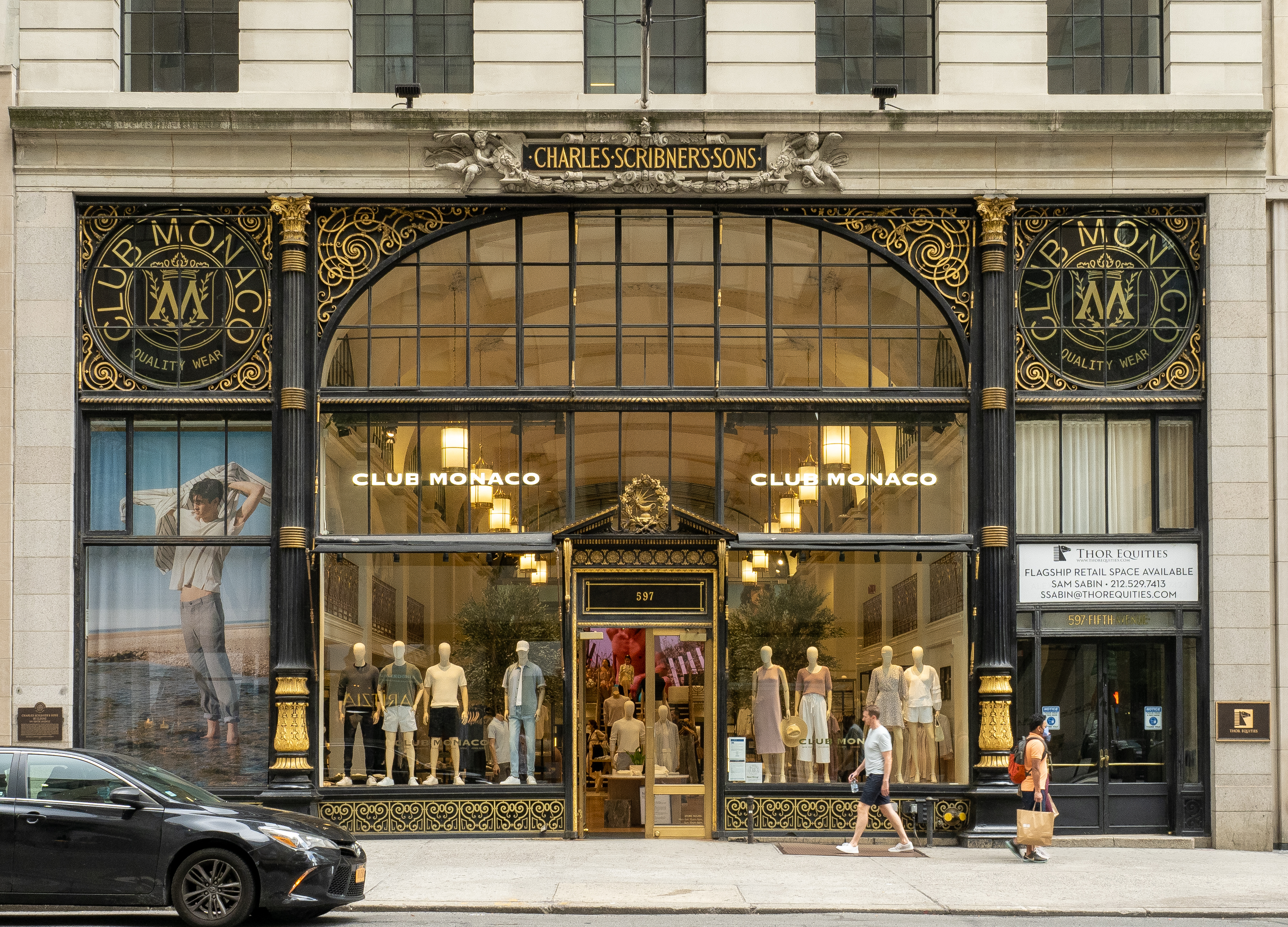
- Club Monaco flagship, 597 Fifth Avenue, Manhattan
- Industry: Retail
- Founded: 1985; 41 years ago in Toronto, Ontario
- Founders: Joe Mimran; Alfred Sung
- Headquarters: New York City, U.S.
- Products: Ready-to-wear; footwear; accessories
- Parent: Ralph Lauren Corporation (1999–2021); Regent, L.P. (2021-)
- Website: clubmonaco.com

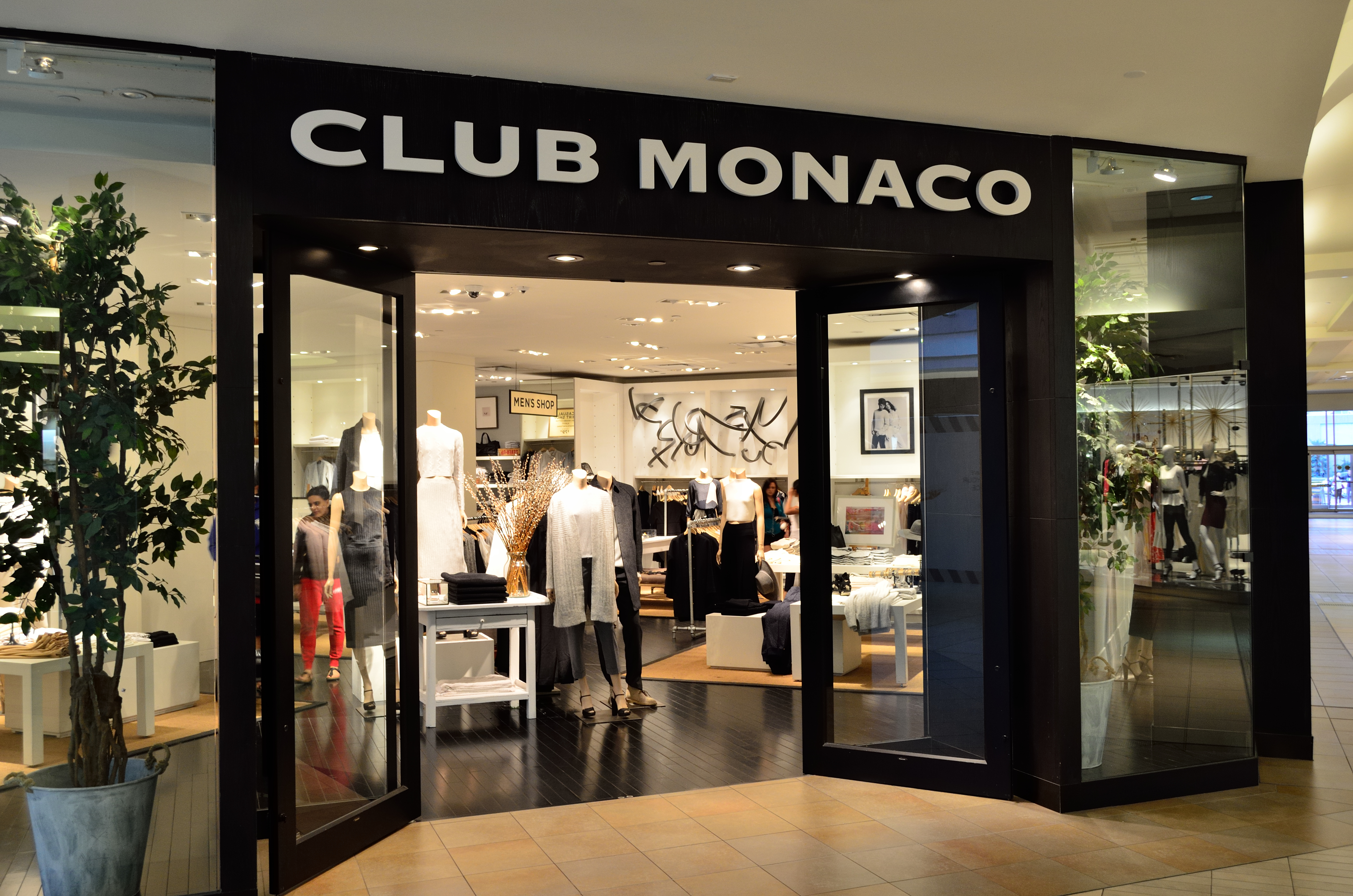
Club Monaco in Fairview Mall, Toronto

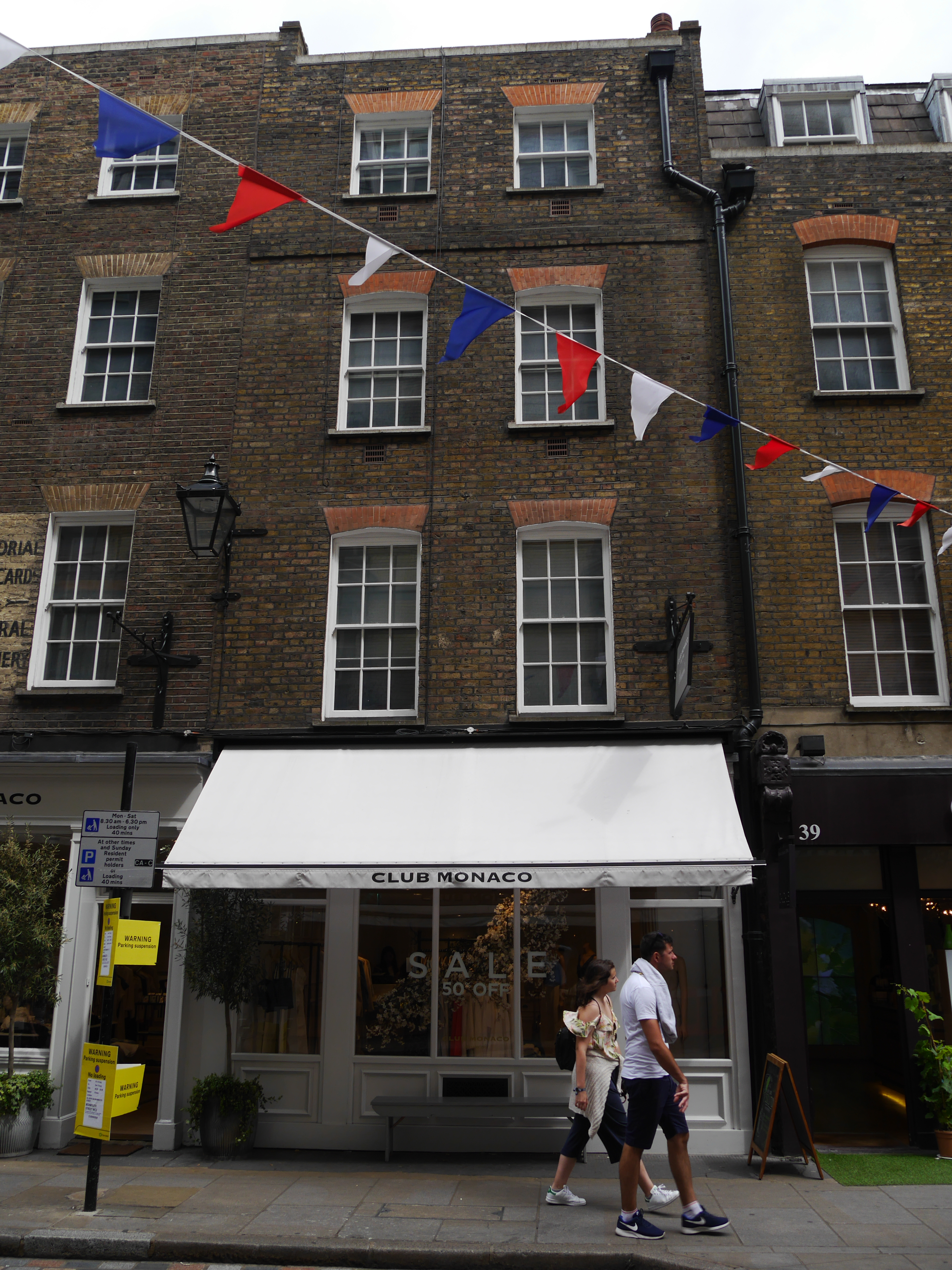
Club Monaco, Monmouth Street, Covent Garden, London

Club Monaco is a Canadian-founded luxury casual clothing retailer owned by Regent, L.P.

== History ==
Club Monaco was founded in 1985 by Canadians Joe Mimran, Saul Mimran, and Alfred Sung powered by the idea of “better basics”. The first Club Monaco store opened in Toronto on Queen Street West in 1985. The approach was simple and clean, mirroring the sensibility of the clothing and featuring a cafe that acted as a place of discovery and community. As the brand grew, new locations continued to open throughout Canada, each retaining its own feel—the Beach store in Toronto featured a lifeguard station display and a small juice bar, while the Eaton Centre store featured a restaurant and flower shop. Each store was a unique expression of the brand with all of the accoutrements.

In 1999, Club Monaco moved to New York City when it was purchased by Ralph Lauren Corporation. Since then, Club Monaco has expanded, opening locations throughout the United States, Europe, and Asia.

In June 2021, Ralph Lauren Corporation sold the Club Monaco brand to Los Angeles based private equity firm Regent LP.

After several years of declining sales, Club Monaco faced financial hardship which resulted in the 2026 closure of US stores and the original flagship store on Queen Street West in Toronto. The brand maintains a minimal online presence.

== Caban ==
Caban was a design-oriented furniture, tabletop, home accessories, bed and bath and apparel retailer launched by Club Monaco as its lifestyle brand in October 2000 in Toronto, Montreal, and Vancouver, with locations opening later in Calgary and Edmonton.

Caban was an offspring of Club Monaco and Joe Mimran, who was the founder of Club Monaco. In 2000, just after the launch, Club Monaco/Caban was purchased by Ralph Lauren Corporation. It began to lose focus, and Mimran was ousted. In the summer of 2006, Ralph Lauren Corporation closed all of the Caban stores to focus on Club Monaco in the United States.

Caban had opened its first lifestyle concept store in Montreal in the historical landmark Laurentian Bank building (located at 777 St. Catherine Street, on the corner of McGill College) on Saturday, December 9, 2000. It closed the branch in 2006.
