= Canadian Arts and Fashion Awards =

Annual awards ceremony

- Founded: February 1, 2014; 12 years ago
- Key people: Deborah Lau-Yu (Director of Graphic Arts); Donna Bishop (Director of Programming); Lisa Kisber (Director of Video Content and Style Correspondent); Qasim Mohammad (Innovation Advisor)
- Owner: Vicky Milner
- Website: www.cafawards.ca

The Canadian Arts & Fashion Awards (CAFA) are an annual award ceremony to recognize and celebrate outstanding achievement and emerging talent in Canadian fashion. The awards were established to encourage the economic development of the Canadian fashion industry and endorse Canadian cultural sovereignty. The event started in January 2014.

The awards include: Womenswear Designer of the Year, Menswear Designer of the Year, The Swarovski Award for Emerging Talent in Fashion, The Swarovski Award for Emerging Talent in Accessories, The Outstanding Achievement Award, Accessory Designer of the Year, The Sephora Image Maker Award, The Hudson's Bay International Canadian Designer of the Year Award, Yorkdale Stylist of the Year, Model of the Year, and Fashion Blogger of the Year.

Members of the jury in 2015 included philanthropist Suzanne A. Rogers, VP of Holt Renfrew Lisa Tant, VP & buying director of The Room, The BAY Nicholas Mellamphy, editor-in-chief of Elle Canada Noreen Flanagan, Coco Rocha, chair and associate professor at Ryerson University Robert Ott, and executive director of the Toronto Fashion Incubator Susan Langdon.

Award winners have included Coco Rocha, Beaufille, Marie Saint Pierre, Philippe Dubuc, Mikhael Kale, Jerome C. Rousseau, Sid Neigum, Tommy Ton, Erdem Moralioğlu, Zeina Esmail, Anais Pouliot, Jeremy Laing, DSQUARED, and Joe Mimran.

== 2018 Winners ==
The 2018 ceremony was held on April 20 at the Fairmont Royal York in Toronto.

Winners are listed first, highlighted in boldface.

**Womenswear Designer of the Year**: **Marie Saint Pierre**; Greta Constantine; Lucian Matis; Stephan Caras; UNTTLD	**Menswear Designer of the Year**: **Atelier New Regime**; Christopher Bates; Dalla; Reigning Champ
**Swarovski Award for Emerging Talent, Fashion**: **Markoo**; Andrew Coimbra; Angelene; WRKDEPT; ZOFF	**Swarovski Award for Emerging Talent, Accessories**: **Sofia Zakia**; Alynne Lavigne; JY Gao; Poppy Barley; Laurie Fleming
**Accessory Designer of the Year**: **ELA**; Biko; Cuchara Jewelry; Herschel Supply Co.; Zvelle	**Outerwear Brand of the Year**: **Canada Goose**; ARCTERYX; Mackage; Sentaler
**Joe Fresh Fashion Innovation Award**: **Shop Shops**; Authentic or Not; North Aware; Passen; Tulip	**Digital Fashion Influencer of the Year**: **Maripier Morin**; Ania Boniecka; Caillianne and Samantha Beckerman; Jillian Lansky
**Simons Fashion Design Student Award**: **Bronwyn Seier**; Jessy Colucci; Larry Frederick Alan James Weir; Lesley Hampton; Mary Marino	**Model of the Year**: **Simon Nessman**; Adrianne Ho; Amber Witcomb; Gracy Mahary
**Image Maker of the Year**: **Petra Collins**; David Picard; Gordon Von Steiner; Malina Corpadean; Norman Wong	**Fresh Face of the Year**: **Aleece Wilson**; Elizabeth Salt; Fred Juneau; Natalie Ludwig; Ryan Keating
**Stylist of the Year**: **Karla Welch**; Cary Tauben; Corey Ng; Leslie Fremar	**Fashion Impact Award**: **Triarchy**; NimiNimi; Peggy Sue Collection; Shine The Light On; The Pin Project
**H&M Sustainability Award**: **Triarchy**; **Outstanding Achievement Award**: **Aldo Bensadoun**
**Suzanne Rogers Designer Grant for International Development**: **Greta Constantine**

== 2019 Winners ==
The 2019 ceremony took place on May 30, at the Fairmont Royal York in Toronto.

Winners are listed first, highlighted in boldface.

**Womenswear Designer of the Year**: **Sid Neigum**; Ellie Mae Studios; Greta Constantine; LINE; UNTTLD	**Menswear Designer of the Year**: **Christopher Bates**; Frank And Oak; Raised by Wolves; 18 Waits
**Swarovski Award for Emerging Talent, Fashion**: **Marie-Ève Lecavalier**; Andrew Coimbra; École de Pensée; Kathryn Bowen; Nonie	**Swarovski Award for Emerging Talent, Accessories**: **Corey Moranis**; Angela Mitchell; Jessica Bedard; JY Gao; Warren Steven Scott
**Accessory Designer of the Year**: **Dean Davidson**; Biko; Matt & Nat; Mejuri; Pyrrha	**Outerwear Brand of the Year**: **Mackage**; Kanuk; Moose Knuckles; Nobis; Sentaler
**Joe Fresh Fashion Innovation Award**: **Focals by North**; Mejuri; Tiary; Typesift	**Digital Fashion Influencer of the Year**: **Fecal Matter**; Dani Roche; Grece Ghanem; Julia Mateian; Kayla Seah
**Simons Fashion Design Student Award**: **Marie-Eve Aubry**; Cynthia Leung; Justine Woods; Marysol Kim; Meron Kebede	**Model of the Year**: **Tasha Tilberg**; Hannah Donker; Judith Maria Bradley; Mae Lapres; Rachel Roberts
**Image Maker of the Year**: **Max Abadian**; Carlyle Routh; D. Picard; Greg Swales; Owen Bruce	**Fresh Face of the Year**: **Krow Kian**; Alyssah Paccoud; Cami You-Ten; Mathieu Simoneau; Sara Kemper
**Stylist of the Year**: **Cary Tauben**; Corey Ng; Juliana Schiavinatto; Nadia Pizzimenti; Randy Smith	**Fashion Impact Award**: **Matt & Nat**; Brave Soles; Ron White Shoes; Sarah Jay; With Love Darling; Wuxly
**H&M Sustainability Award**: **KOTN**; Eliza Faulkner; Frank And Oak; Preloved	**Makeup Artist of the Year**: **Hung Vanngo**; Grace Lee; Leslie-Ann Thomson; Nicolas Blanchet; Simone Otis
**Hair Artist of the Year**: **Harry Josh**; Andrew Ly; David D’Amours; Kirsten Klontz; Matthew Collins	**Outstanding Achievement Award**: **Douglas Kirkland**
**International Canadian Designer Award**: **Aurora James**	**Vanguard Award**: **Thierry-Maxime Loriot**
**Suzanne Rogers Designer Grant for International Development**: **Sid Neigum**

== 2021 Winners ==
The 2021 ceremony took place on May 19, virtually, hosted by Amanda Brugel.

Winners are listed first, highlighted in boldface.

**Womenswear Designer of the Year**: **Greta Constantine**; Beaufille; Eliza Faulkner; Judith & Charles; UNTTLD	**Menswear Designer of the Year**: **3.PARADIS**; Dime; Frank and Oak; HAVEN; Hip and Bone; Raised by Wolves
**Swarovski Award for Emerging Talent, Fashion**: **Victoria Hayes**; Luxton; Mani Jassal; RVNG; Spencer Badu; Steven Lejambe	**Swarovski Award for Emerging Talent, Accessories**: **Fumile**; Angela Mitchell; Cat Janiga; Fellow Earthlings; Maguire; Partoem
**Accessory Designer of the Year**: **Mejuri**; Biko; ela Handbags; Herschel Supply Company; Matt & Nat; Wolf Circus	**Outerwear Brand of the Year**: **Arc’teryx**; Kanuk; Nicole Benisti; Sentaler; Soia & Kyo
**Joe Fresh Fashion Innovation Award**: **Sheertex**; 42 Technologies; Casca; Sozie; Spocket	**Digital Fashion Influencer of the Year**: **Donté Colley**; Ania Boniecka; Lauren Chan; Lily Yange; Sarain Fox; Valeria Lipovetsky
**Simons Fashion Design Student Award**: **Pierre-Olivier Allard**; Charlotte Deneux; Matin Mithras; McJoyin Rey; Rachel Sudbury	**Model of the Year**: **Mae Lapres**; Charles Oduro; Fred Juneau; Kate Bock; Malik Lindo
**Image Maker of the Year**: **Greg Swales**; Carlyle Routh; Justin Wu; Maya Fuhr; Royal Gilbert	**Fresh Face of the Year**: **Shayna McNeill**; Anisha Sandhu; Ariish Wol; Nic Kim; Nya Gatbel; Rachelle Harris
**Hudson’s Bay Stylist of the Year Award**: **Corey Ng**; Nadia Pizzimenti; Olivia Leblanc; Randy Smith; Zeina Esmail	**Fashion Impact Award**: **Lesley Hampton**; Brass & Unity; Knix; Manitobah Mukluks; Obakki; Sarah Jay
**Tricon Sustainability Award**: **Kent Woman**; Frank and Oak; Norden; TAMGA Designs; Wuxly	**Makeup Artist of the Year**: **Grace Lee**; Beau Nelson; Genevieve Lenneville; Nicolas Blanchet; Sabrina Rinaldi
**Hair Artist of the Year**: **Steven Turpin**; David D’Amours; Justin German; Kirsten Klontz; Matthew Collins	**Outstanding Achievement Award**: **Maye Musk**
**International Canadian Designer Award**: **Tanya Taylor**	**Vanguard Award**: **OVO Sound** (Oliver El-Khatib)

== 2022 Winners ==
The 2022 ceremony took place on October 15 at the Fairmont Royal York in Toronto, hosted by Grace Mahary and Karine Vanasse.

Winners are listed first, highlighted in boldface.

**Womenswear Designer of the Year**: **LECAVALIER**; Greta Constantine; Hilary MacMillan; Silk Laundry; UNTTLD	**Menswear Designer of the Year**: **Mr. Saturday**; Christopher Bates; École de Pensée; Raised by Wolves; SECTION 35
**Award for Emerging Talent, Fashion**: **Maguire**; Combinist Goods; Cyntia Miglio; Jewels & Aces; Mas; Steff Eleoff	**Accessory Designer of the Year**: **Melanie Auld Jewellery**; Biko; Ecksand; Heirloom Hats; L’intervalle; Maple
**Outerwear Brand of the Year**: **Sentaler**; Kanuk; Nobis; Noize; Quartz Co	**Fashion Innovation Award**: **Calico** (Kathleen Chan); BlackCart; Blanka; FoldsWear
**Digital Fashion Creator of the Year**: **Myles Sexton**; Laurence Fortin-Cote; Lexson Millington; Liv Judd; Sean Brown	**Fashion Design Student Award**: **Kevin Quang Thai Nguyen**; Gabriel Paul Caron; Lynne Hey; Mihaela Stoica; Suki Chow
**Model of the Year**: **Awar Odhiang**; Ariish Wol; Ash Foo; Kirsten Owen; Steph Shiu	**Image Maker of the Year**: **Justin Wu**; Carlos Alyse; Conor Cunningham; Norman Wong; Renata Kaveh; William Ukoh
**Fresh Face of the Year**: **Willow Allen**; Belle Vanderkley; Mase Somonall; Monywiir Deng; Sihan Guo	**Stylist of the Year Award**: **Nariman Janghorban**; Amanda Lee Shirreffs; Florence O. Durand; Georgia Groom; Nadia Pizzimenti; Skye Kelton
**Fashion Impact Award**: **Izzy Camilleri**; Elita; Knix; Widethebrand; Wuxly	**Sustainability Award**: **Kelly Drennan** (Fashion Takes Action); Bedi; Ecologyst; Thesus; Triarchy; Wuxly
**Makeup Artist of the Year**: **Viktor Peters**; Emily Cheng; Julie Cusson; Leslie-Ann Thomson; Mimi Choi; Nisha Gulati	**Hair Artist of the Year**: **Janet Jackson**; Chanel Croker; Kirsten Klontz; Kristjan Hayden; Matthew Collins
**2022 Change Maker Award**: **Sage Paul**	**2022 Change Maker Award**: **George Sully**
**Outstanding Achievement Award**: **SSENSE** (Bassel Atallah, Firas Atallah, and Rami Atallah)	**International Canadian Designer Award**: **Jennifer Zuccarini** (Fleur du Mal)
**Vanguard Award**: **Brooke Wall**

== 2023 Winners ==
The 2023 ceremony took place on October 14 at the Fairmont Royal York in Toronto, hosted by Brooke Lynn Hytes.

Winners are listed first, highlighted in boldface.

**Womenswear Designer of the Year**: **LAMARQUE**; Eliza Faulkner; Hilary MacMillan; RVNG Couture; Silk Laundry	**Menswear Designer of the Year**: **École de Pensée**; Frank And Oak; Raised by Wolves; SECTION 35
**Award for Emerging Talent, Fashion**: **Dorian Who**; 3-dimensional; Adidem Asterisks*; Golshaah; Ouma; SteMargScot	**Award for Emerging Talent, Accessories**: **Life Liveth in Me**; Lo’bat; Lunar Rain; Lunetterie Generale; Omi Woods; Steff Eleoff
**Accessory Designer of the Year**: **Vitaly**; Biko; David Dunkley Fine Millinery; Dean Davidson; Lambert	**Outerwear Brand of the Year**: **RUDSAK**; FREED; HiSO; Quartz Co
**Fashion Innovation Award**: **Cash Labs**; BlackCart; Blanka; Olbrich Knitwear	**Digital Fashion Creator of the Year**: **Sasha Exeter**; Carla Rockmore; Dorian Who; Liv Judd; Sara Camposarcone
**Fashion Design Student Award**: **Sam Huang**; Allison Dunne; Eunice Chow; Jacqueline Bradica; Serena Li; Will Crosson	**Model of the Year**: **Lauren Chan**; Alexis Carrington; Angaer Adrop; Diane Chiu
**Image Maker of the Year**: **Renata Kaveh**; Evaan Kheraj; Garrett Naccarato; Nick Merzetti; Richard Bernardin	**Fresh Face of the Year**: **Heather Diamond Strongarm**; Coco Labbee; Kate McNamara; Nyawurh Chuol; Ryan Park
**Stylist of the Year Award**: **Nadia Pizzimenti**; Bobby Bowen; Florence O. Durand; Leila Bani; Olivia Leblanc	**Fashion Impact Award**: **Manitobah**; Aille Design; Fashion Art Toronto; KOTN; LIGNES DE FUITE; Mejuri
**Sustainability Award**: **Triarchy**; Adhere to; KOTN; Londre; Triarchy; Mejuri; Quartz Co	**Makeup Artist of the Year**: **Simone Otis**; Aniya Nandy; Caroline Levin; Julie Cusson; Nate Palacios; Sabrina Rinaldi
**Hair Artist of the Year**: **Andrew Ly**; Adrian Carew; Kirsten Klontz; Kristjan Hayden; Ryan McGovern; Stephane Scotto Di Cesare	**Vanguard Honoree**: **Aurora James**
**Changemaker Honoree**: **Amber-Dawn Bear Robe**; **Joanna Griffiths**	**International Canadian Designer of the Year Honoree**: **Justin R. Saunders**
**Outstanding Achievement Honoree**: **Dani Reiss**

== See also ==
- List of fashion awards
