= Fuckin' Up =

Live album by Neil & the Horse
- Released: April 26, 2024
- Recorded: November 4, 2023
- Venues: The Rivoli, Toronto, Canada
- Genres: Rock; garage rock
- Length: 68:24
- Label: Reprise
- Producers: Neil Young; Niko Bolas

Neil Young chronology
Before and After (2023)	Fuckin' Up (2024)	Early Daze (2024)

Crazy Horse chronology
Odeon Budokan (2023)	Fuckin' Up (2024)	Early Daze (2024)

Fuckin' Up (also censored as Fu##in' Up) is a live album by Canadian-American singer-songwriter Neil Young and his band Crazy Horse under the name Neil & the Horse, released on April 26, 2024, through the Other Shoe Productions and Reprise Records. It is a live recording of their 1990 grunge album Ragged Glory, with each track retitled with a phrase taken from the lyrics (with the exception of the cover version of "Farmer John"). The final song on Ragged Glory, "Mother Earth (Natural Anthem)", was not performed. The album was recorded at a private birthday party for businessman Dani Reiss held at the Rivoli in Toronto, Canada on November 4, 2023. Fuckin' Up received positive reviews from critics.

== Critical reception ==
Professional ratings
Aggregate scores
Source	Rating
Metacritic	81/100
Review scores
Source	Rating
AllMusic	3.5/5 stars
Classic Rock	4/5 stars
The Independent	7/10
Mojo	4/5 stars
Paste	8.0/10
Pitchfork	7.6/10
PopMatters	8/10
Slant Magazine	8/10
Tom Hull – on the Web	B+
Uncut	8/10

Fuckin' Up received a score of 81 out of 100 on review aggregator Metacritic based on eight critics' reviews, which the website categorised as "universal acclaim". Mojo commented that there is an "undeniable zip" to the tracks, while Uncut felt that the album "captures Young and the Horse on blazing form", noting that Nelson is "a capable duelling partner for Young" and "Lofgren's honky-tonk piano lends a shimmying quality to these craggy, elemental songs". PopMatters' Christopher J. Lee said that it "highlights Neil Young and Crazy Horse at their best – loose, loud, and long-lasting, but without being long-winded".

A staff review from AllMusic stated that the tracks are "refram[ed ...] in a live setting that's somehow even more ragged, and just as glorious" and "stretche[d] out a little more than on record [...] as Young tries new tricks with his guitar tones and the band injects some exploration into the jammier sections of the tunes". Nick Seip of Slant Magazine felt that the live setting adds "even more grit and grime" as "it's truer to the spirit of the material, as the messier mix captures the energy of a one-and-done performance". Stuart Berman of Pitchfork commented that "the lack of contextual detail puts the focus squarely on Crazy Horse's incandescent noise and slack yet unfailingly steady momentum" and the album "makes a convincing case for Ragged Glory as the definitive Crazy Horse album, showcasing the group in their purest, crudest state".

== Track listing ==
All tracks are written by Neil Young, except "Broken Circle (Over and Over) written by Neil Young and Frank Sampedro and "Farmer John" written by Don "Sugarcane" Harris and Dewey Terry.

Fuckin' Up track listing
No.	Title	Length
1.	"City Life" (Country Home)	6:38
2.	"Feels Like a Railroad (River of Pride)" (White Line)	2:59
3.	"Heart of Steel" (Fuckin' Up)	5:54
4.	"Broken Circle" (Over and Over)	9:05
5.	"Valley of Hearts" (Love to Burn)	12:55
6.	"Farmer John"	3:50
7.	"Walkin' in My Place (Road of Tears)" (Mansion on the Hill)	6:50
8.	"To Follow One's Own Dream" (Days That Used to Be)	4:52
9.	"A Chance on Love" (Love and Only Love)	15:21
Total length:		68:24

== Personnel ==
Neil & the Horse

- Neil Young – lead vocals, guitar, harmonica, production
- Ralph Molina – drums, backing vocals
- Billy Talbot – bass, backing vocals
- Nils Lofgren – guitar, piano, backing vocals
- Micah Nelson – guitar, piano, backing vocals

Additional contributors

- Niko Bolas – production
- John Hanlon – mixing
- Tim Mulligan – engineering
- Mark Humphries – monitor engineering
- Dani Reiss – presenter

== Charts ==
Chart performance for Fuckin' Up
Chart (2024)	Peak position
Austrian Albums (Ö3 Austria)	11
Belgian Albums (Ultratop Flanders)	74
Belgian Albums (Ultratop Wallonia)	77
Croatian International Albums (HDU)	21
French Albums (SNEP)	130
German Albums (Offizielle Top 100)	12
Portuguese Albums (AFP)	127
Scottish Albums (Official Charts)	16
Spanish Albums (Promusicae)	80
Swiss Albums (Schweizer Hitparade)	8
UK Americana Albums (Official Charts)	5
UK Album Downloads (Official Charts)	23
UK Record Store (OCC)	39
US Top Album Sales (Billboard)	42
US Top Current Album Sales (Billboard)	31
US Indie Store Album Sales (Billboard)	16
