= International Festival of Computer Arts =

Computer arts festival in Slovenia

International Festival of Computer Arts Mednarodni festival računalniških umetnosti
- Genre: Art festival
- Frequency: Annually
- Location: Maribor
- Country: Slovenia
- Established: 1995
- Founder: Maribor Youth Culture Centre
- Website: http://mfru.org

The International Festival of Computer Arts (IFCA; Slovene: Mednarodni festival računalniških umetnosti, MFRU) is the longest-running computer arts festival in Slovenia. IFCA presents theory and practices of computer arts and new media arts. It is one of the major institutions for the presentation, support and production of computer media, electronics, and interdisciplinary art in the region and is responsible for the development of new media art and theory.

== History ==
The International Festival of Computer Arts (IFCA) was first held in 1995 in Maribor, the second-largest city in Slovenia. The festival presented a number of local and foreign artists, theoreticians, performers, developers and curators.

In 2009, the festival joined forces with Kibla and have held a joint festival in the media arts. Supporters of the festival include the University of Maribor, the Maribor Art Gallery, and Arts Council England.

== Course ==
The IFCA has been held annually for about five days and is organized by the Maribor Youth Culture Centre (MKC Maribor).

The program consists of seminars, conferences, exhibitions and performances selected by invited curators and selectors and by the program director of the festival, who has a three-year mandate.

The festival connects different locations in the town and in neighboring cities – and different urban, regional and international producers, institutions and festivals of similar interests. From its beginnings, it has established cooperation with educational institutions of all levels: from nursery, primary and secondary schools, to colleges and universities with new media programs in Maribor, nationally and internationally.

== Festival themes and editions ==
- 1995 – presentation of Slovenian new media artists
- 1996 – new body
- 1997 – interactivity
- 1998 – n/a
- 1999 – n/a
- 2000 – the incidence and attitudes towards physicality in art dependent on new technologies
- 2001 – BODY: fleeting, sick and cloned in erotic embrace of technology + establish a domain and website www.mfru.org
- 2002 – expanded body
- 2003 – transformation / metamorphosis
- 2004 – n/a
- 2005 – n/a
- 2006 – light up, plug in, outage
- 2007 – where there are computers, there is life: error and chance
- 2008 – can image today shows something (the potential of media images)? + establishing www.mkc.si/hiperfilm
- 2010 – new image, new nature, new consciousness
- 2011 – transmedia storytelling
- 2012 – robotics and new ways of thinking man
- 2013 – when worlds collide
- 2014 – 2.0 (20th edition of the festival)
- 2015 – Lift Me Up
- 2016 – Trust.1

== List of curators and selectors ==
- 1995 – Marina Gržinić, Aleksandra Kostić, Jože Slaček
- 1996 – Erkki Huhtamo, Aleksandra Kostić, Machiko Kusahara, Jože Slaček
- 1997 – Peter Tomaž Dobrila, Aleksandra Kostić, Jože Slaček
- 1998 – Stelarc, Igor Štromajer
- 1999 – Marina Gržinić, Stelarc, Igor Štromajer
- 2000 – Kathy Rae Huffman, Jurij Krpan, Marina Gržinić
- 2001 – Kathy Rae Huffman, Jurij Krpan, Eva Ursprung
- 2002 – Jože Slaček, Eva Ursprung, Heimo Ranzenbacher
- 2003 – Marina Gržinić, Jože Slaček, Simona Vidmar
- 2004 – Simona Vidmar, son:DA, Marina Gržinić, Narvika Bovcon, Aleš Vaupotič, Peter Weibel, Jurij Krpan, Srečo Dragan, Miloš Bašin
- 2005 – Peter Weibel, Narvika Bovcon, Aleš Vaupotič, Jože Slaček, Srečo Dragan
- 2006 – Peter Weibel, Jaka Železnikar, Narvika Bovcon, Aleš Vaupotič, Srečo Dragan, Dunja Kukovec, Marina Gržinić, Dušan Bučar
- 2007 – Dunja Kukovec, Alexandra Weltz, Marina Gržinić, Jasmina Založnik, Jože Slaček
- 2008–2009 – Melita Zajc, Marko Ornik
- 2010–2012 – Marko Ornik
- 2013–2015 – Nina Jeza
- 2016

== List of artists and theoreticians ==
- 1995 – Andrej Troha, Atanor, Saša Divjak, Werkstadt Graz, Vojko Pogačar, Špela Hudnik. Machiko Kusahara, Inštitut informacijskih znanosti Maribor (IZUM), Peter Ciuha, Tjaša Demšar, Marina Gržinić, Aina Šmid, Darij Kreuh, Metod Vidic, Art Futura, Marko Peljhan, Mitja Praznik, Bojan Štokelj, Erkki Huhtamo, Neven Korda, ICC Tokijo, Studio K7, Christan Vanderborght, Archiomediala, British Computer Animation, Zemira Alajbegovič, Mitja Reichenberg, Bogdan Soban, Inštitut Egon Marč - Marko Košnik Virant, Sašo Jankovič, INTIMA teater, OŠ Milan Šoštarič, Marjan Kokot, Josef Klammer in Seppo Grundler, Andrej Škrlep, Darij Zadnikar, Božidar Kante, Srečo Dragan, Janez Strehovec
- 1996 – Georg Legrady, Erkki Huhtamo, Igor Štromajer, Bojana Kunst, Marina Gržinić, Aina Šmid, Marko Rodošek, Machiko Kusahara, Monika Fleischmann, Wolfgang Strauss, Margaret Morse, Stelarc, Kathy Rae Huffman, Vuk Ćosić, Luka Frelih, Teo Spiller, Trevor Batten, Marko Butina, EIKE, Alain Escalle, Takahiko Iimura, Branka D. Jurišić, Raj Petrot Kraljev, Darij Kreuh, Sigrid Langrehr, Petra de Nijs, OŠ Borci za severno mejo, Rozika Puvar, Nada Prlja, Mojca Sekulić, Ivo Buda, Jacek Szleszynski, Rasa Smite, Raitis Smits, Sokolski dom Ilirska Bistrica, Marko Seketin, CYBERFLASH, Bojan Štokelj, Srečo Dragan, Aleksandro Amaducci, Vojko Pogačar
- 1997 – Petra de Nijs, Teo Spiller, Marko Rodošek, Paul Sarmon, Simon Biggs, Darij Kreuh, Srečo Dragan, Marjetica Potrč, Alenka Pirman, Petra Varl Simončič, Igor Štromajer, Dragan Živadinov, Dolores Šegina, Dejan Štampar, Borut Wenzel, Nataša Prosenc, Darko Golija, Damjan Kracina, Darinko Kores, Franc Purg, Sašo Janković, Janez Strehovec, Bojan Štokelj, Sašo Janković, Dejan Flaškar, Mitja Koštomaj, Igor Kuduz, Vladislav Knežević, Simon B. Narath, Mario Kalogjera, Thomas Bayrle, Anne Farrell, Phil Earle, Paul Booker, d.j. Ozzy, Nigel Helyer, Ken Gregory, Margaret Jahrmann in Max Moswitzer, OŠ Bratov Polančičev, Marko Matjaž, Marti Ribas in Nuria Garcia, Matjaž Godec, Čriček, Leonard Rubins, Produkcija Sokolski dom Ilirska Bistrica
- 1998 – Olia Lianina, Srečo Dragan, The Stroj, Random Logic, Bojan Štokelj, Jaka Železnikar, Christina Goestl, Bogdan Soban, Leonard Rubins, Marko Rodošek, Marryann, Trevor Batten, Heidemaria Seblatnig, Jordan Crandell, Teo Spiller, Stelarc, Melita Zajc, Bojana Kunst, Mojca Kumerdej, Janez Strehovec, Heidemaria Seblatnig, Laibach, Gledališče čez cesto, OŠ Bojana Ilicha, Vuk Čosić, Marko Peljhan, Marjan Kokot, založba Koda, Brane Zorman, Netbase t0, Damjan Kracina, Dominik Križan, Gašper Jemec, Wipeout
- 1999 – Igor Štromajer, cw4t7abs, Stelarc, Rainer Linz, Steven Middleton, Rachel Armstrong, Lisa Brandt, Cornelia Sollfrank, Kathy Rae Huffman, Helene von Oldenburg, Claudia Reiche, Eva Ursprung, Marina Gržinić, Margarete Jahrmann, Gordana Andjelić Galić, Eclipse, Jill Godmilow, Enes Zlatar, Darij Kreuh, Bogdan Soban, Martin Očko, Marjan Šijanec, Gordana Novaković, Teo Spiller, Mark Tribe, Brian Goldfarb, Aleksander Bassin, Morfej, hHex, Klon ART, I O SUB SYStems, Marko Rodošek, Branko Cerovac, SERŠ Maribor, Tine Gornik, Peter Janžič, Jaka Uršič, Tine Erjavec, Denis Škrbal, OŠ Ludvika Pliberška, Andrius Ventslova, Bojan Štokelj, Leonard Rubins, Bojan Jurc, Yam Damil, Blind Passengers
- 2000 – Teo Spiller, Marina Gržinić, Nina Czegledy, Marikki Hakola, Ardele Lister, Kathy Rae Huffman, Ken Feingold, Arthur Elsenaar, Stelarc, Chico McMurtrie, Stahl Stenslie, Marcel-Li Antunez Roca, dr. Igor Čuček, dr. Miro Gurnee, dr. Tomislav Klokočovnik, dr. Matjaž Jeras, dr. Mio Knežević, Ive Tabar, Karel Dudesek, Luka Drinovec, Tanja Ostojić, Martin Očko, Leonard Rubins, Video Data Bank, Božidar Svetek, Interakt, Janja Rakuš, Werkstadt Graz, Marjan Šijanec, Tomaž Brenk, Simon Šimat, Albin Bezjak, Gorazd Špajzer, Martin Smitz, Aleksandra Globokar, Vuk Ćosić, Ile Cvetovski, Kristina Miljanovski, Zvonimir Bakotin, Arghyro Paouri, Van Gogh TV, Fakulteta uporabnih umetnosti Dunaj, Zvonimir Bakotin, Bojana Kunst, OŠ Franc Rozman Stane, Veztax, Joel Mull, Shocker-D, Trick-C, Damon Wild, Umek, Tine, Teenage Techno Punk, Diskordia, Smart, Aleksij, Alen, Dave Slide, Mery, Programme 5, Ile Cvetovski, Maria Pallier, Marko Rodošek, Srečo Dragan, David Kokalj, Anica Uhan, Andreja Nunar, Goran Šajn, Jaka Krivic, Matjaž Kurinčič, Primož Dujc, Živa Moškrič, Tina Kolenik, Ciril Horjak, Markelj, Susa, Klavdij Zalar, Dušan Bučar, Miha Perčič, Robert Černelč, Franc Solina
- 2001 – son:DA, Heimo Ranzenbacher, Werner Jauk, Alien Productions, Rob Gawthrop, BeverlyHood, Rachel Baker, Chico MacMurtrie, Cym, Bob Levene, Rahel Zweig, Ales Zemene, Mike Hentz, Gillian Dyson, Drew Hemment, lizvlx, Timothy Druckrey, Chris Gladwin, Petar Dundov, Elex Red, Alen Sforzina, Shocker D
- 2002 – Keiko Takahashi, Dietmar Offenhuber, Markus Decker, Jomasound, son:DA, Igor Štromajer, Srečo Dragan, Stelarc, Dušan Zidar, Eva Ursprung, Heimo Ranzenbacher, Takumi Endo, Norman Lin, Zoran Srdić, Gašper Jemec, Sylva Smejkalova, Narvika Bovcon, Aleš Vaupotič, Boštjan Kavčič, Kristina Horvat Blažinović, Arven Šakti Kralj, Jernej Mali, Dušan Bučar, Multi Video 2002 video production ALU, Franc Solina, Peter Peer, Samo Juvan, Borut Bogataj, Dominik Olmiah Križan, Sašo Sedlaček, Kitch Art, Marina Gržinić, Ines Krasič
- 2003 – Allucquére Rosanne (Sandy) Stone, El Bahattee, Bogdan Soban, Marko Rodošek, Neven Korda, Alex Sword, John Chevalier, D*I*R*T*Y, Natxo Rodríguez Arkaute, Fito Rodríguez Bornaetxea, Nina Kovacheva, Valentin Stefanoff, Simon Kardum, Dragica Marinič, Zvone Štor, Franc Solina, Srečo Dragan, Dušan Bučar, Peter Tomaž Dobrila, Meta Trampuš, Zoran Savin, Zvone Štor, Ivan Pal, Bojan Golčar, Vuk Ćosić, Luka Dekleva, Antoine Lebas, Clovis Goux, Guillaume Sorge, Dominik Križan, Metka Zupanič, Matjaž Jogan, Zoran Srdič, Primož Novak, Sanela Jahtić, Aleš Vaupotič, Narvika Bavcon, Gašper Jemec, Ana Zadnik, Vedran Vražalič, Kristina Horvat, Šakti Kralj, Boštjan Lapajne, Nika Oblak, Brane Gračnar, Matej Lavrenčič, Mladen Stopnik, Tomaž Bobnar, Anže Robida, Janez Gorjup, Mitja Šturm, Dominik Bele, Franc Solina, Doris Batelič, Barbara Jurkovšek, Polona Šterk, Nina Vrhovec, Živa Kalaš, Jaka Drzanič, Aleksander Brezlan, Željka Habl, Jernej Kokelj, Jan Petrič, Maja Smrekar, Živa Žitnik, Matic Sonnenwald, Anja Tolar, Nataša Colja, Urša Drabik, Ana Sluga, Marina Gruden, Dana Avgušt in Generative art
- 2004 – Marnix de Nijs, Edwin van der Heide, Alexander Zika, Eftychia Shinas, YOlk Art, Barak Reiser, E-CART, Johan Thom, Constanze Ruhm, David Link, Davide Grassi, Branko Zupan, (Art Practices), Hannes Böck, Dorian Bonelli, Alice Cannava, Verena Dengle, David Kellner, Consuella Kunz, Sonja Draub, Eduard Freudmann, Ramon Grendene, Priska Graf, Christian Sperl, Moira Hille, Katharina Lampert, Ralo Mayer, Dragičevič, Ivan & Laura, Chris Gierlinger, David Kellner, Lilla Khoor, Koloman Kann, Consuela Kunz, Christian Mayer, Ralo Mayer, Philipp Haupt, Henninga Schorna, Achim Stiermann, Roland Seidel, Julia Wagner, Dunja Kukovec, Luka Prinčič, Sibylle Hauert, Daniel Reichmuth, Beatrix Bakondy, Kerstin von Gabain, Borjana Ventzislavova, Miroslav Nicić, son:DA, Narvika Bovcon, Aleš Vaupotič, Klemen Gorup, kitch shop, Boštjan Kavčič, Metka Zupanič, Nika Oblak, Primož Novak, Vedran Vražalič, Gašper Jemec, Nadav Sagir, Martina Zelenika, Ralo Mayer, Boštjan Kavčič, Matija Krajnc, Goran Skofic, Liza Zufic, Goran Cace, Matija Debeljuh, Marija Prusina, Lado Zrnic, Miha Ciglar, Random Logic, Janez Strehovec, Laboratorij za računalniško grafiko in umetno inteligenco Univerze v Mariboru, Magdalena Pederin, Umek, Sam O Sim, Reaky, Shocker, Shark, Sanjin, Timoo, mc. Hobo
- 2005 – Peter Weibel, Markus Huemer, Orhan Kipcak, Laura Beloff, Erich Berger, Martin Pichlmair, Seven Mile Boots, Narvika Bovcon, Aleš Vaupotič, Andruid Kerne, Marcos Weskamp, Amy Alexander, Florian Cramer, Olga Goriunova, Matthew Fuller, Alex McLean, Alexei Shulgin, Yes Men, Martin Bricelj, LeCielEstBleu, IRWIN, Wikipedia Slovenija, Creative Commons Slovenija, SCCA-Ljubljana, ArtNetLab, Eclipse, Dušan Bučar, Bogdan Soban, Miha Ciglar, Srečo Dragan, Akademija za likovno umetnost Univerze v Ljubljani, Visoka strokovna šola Hagenberg, Gornjeavstrijska univerza uporabnih znanosti, Univerza umetnosti Beograd, Luiza Margan, Tomaž Furlan, Klemen Jeraša, Uroš Potočnik, Brina Torkar, Ana Čigon, Julijan Borštnik, Dominik Mahnič, Vita Žgur, Nina Slejko, Mark Požlep, FH Hagenberg, Jovan Čekić, Maja Stanković, Antea Arizanović, Maja Rakočević, Arion Asllani, Tatjana Krstevski, Ivana Ilić, Bojana Nikolić, Sara Oblišar, Đorđe Arambašić, Vlada Paunović, Danijela Popović, Ivana Smiljanić, Milica Ružičić, Ana Nedeljković, ArtNetLab, Srečo Dragan, Klemen Gorup, Boštjan Kavčič, Gorazd Krnc, Tilen Žbona, Vanja Mervič, Robi Caglič, Evelin Stermitz, Martina Zelenika, Gašper Demšar, Nadav Sagir, Vesna Čadež, Inštituta za medijsko umetnost Univerze za uporabne umetnosti Dunaj, Clements Pitter, Martin Eder, Bianca Scharler, Florian Knisperl, Famul Stuart, son:DA, Andraž Beguš, Andrej Gulič, Jasmina Karik, Tina Krajnc, Bojana Križanec, Nuša Pavko, Urša Potokar, Mojca Resinovič
- 2006 – ambientTV.net, Manu Luksch, Mukul Patel, Selda Asal, Miljana Babić, Marko Batista, Luka Frelih, Ana Hušman, NOMADTV, Basak Senova, Erhan Muratoglu, Derdimi Anla, Erhan Muratoglu, Ertug Uçar, Simge Goksoy, Cem Yardimci, John Barret, Selda Asal, Ceren Oykut, Guven Çatak, Serap Dogan, Neuropolitan Chiron Morpheus, Borut Savski, Luka Prinčič, Ran Slavin, Sašo Sedlaček, Temp, Elke Auer, Esther Straganz, Nancy Mauro-Flude, Annja Krautgasser, Vanja Mervič, Tilen Žbona, Mauro Arrighi, Andrea Gastaldi, Gorazd Krnc, Luka Leskovšek, Jaka Železnikar, Shockbot Corejulio, Robi Caglič, Peter Ciuha, Stefan Bindreiter, Barak Reiser, Maja Smrekar, Klemen Jeraša, VJ Dominik Mahnič
- 2007 – Atypiclab, Teresa Almeida, Marko Batista, Ali Cabbar, Miha Ciglar, Rodrigo Derteano, Stefan Doepner, Urška Golob, Kinda Hassan, Aline Helmcke, Sara Kolster, Derek Holzer, IMA Inštitut za medijsko arheologijo / Institute for Media Archeology, Kid Dog, Vesna Krebs, Daša Lakner, Alessandro Ludovico, Jure Novak, Marko Ornik, Ana Pečar, Dino Schreilechner, Sattyananda, Solmaz Shahbazi, Jeremy Schaller, Canan Senol, son:DA, Staalplaat Soundsystem, Tomaž Šolc, Igor Štromajer, Brane Zorman, Trak47, ubermorgen.com, Paolo Cirio, Eduardo Kac, Kiberpipa : Err0r, Alessandro Ludovico, Trie
- 2008 – Edvard Zajec, Optofonica Surround Cinema, Wo0+Izvanredni Bob, Maurzizio Martinucci aka TeZ, Luka Frelih, Luka Prinčič, Trak 47, BridA (Sendi Mango, Jurij Pavlica, Tom Kerševan), Borut Žalik, David Podgorelec, Sebastian Krivograd, Jae C. Oh, kolektiv La Vitrine

== Sources ==
- http://mkc.si/mfru-ofestivalu
- http://mkc.si/sl/arhiv-mfru/arhiv-2014/1027-hiperfilmmfru
