= Sid Neigum =

Canadian fashion designer (born 1988)

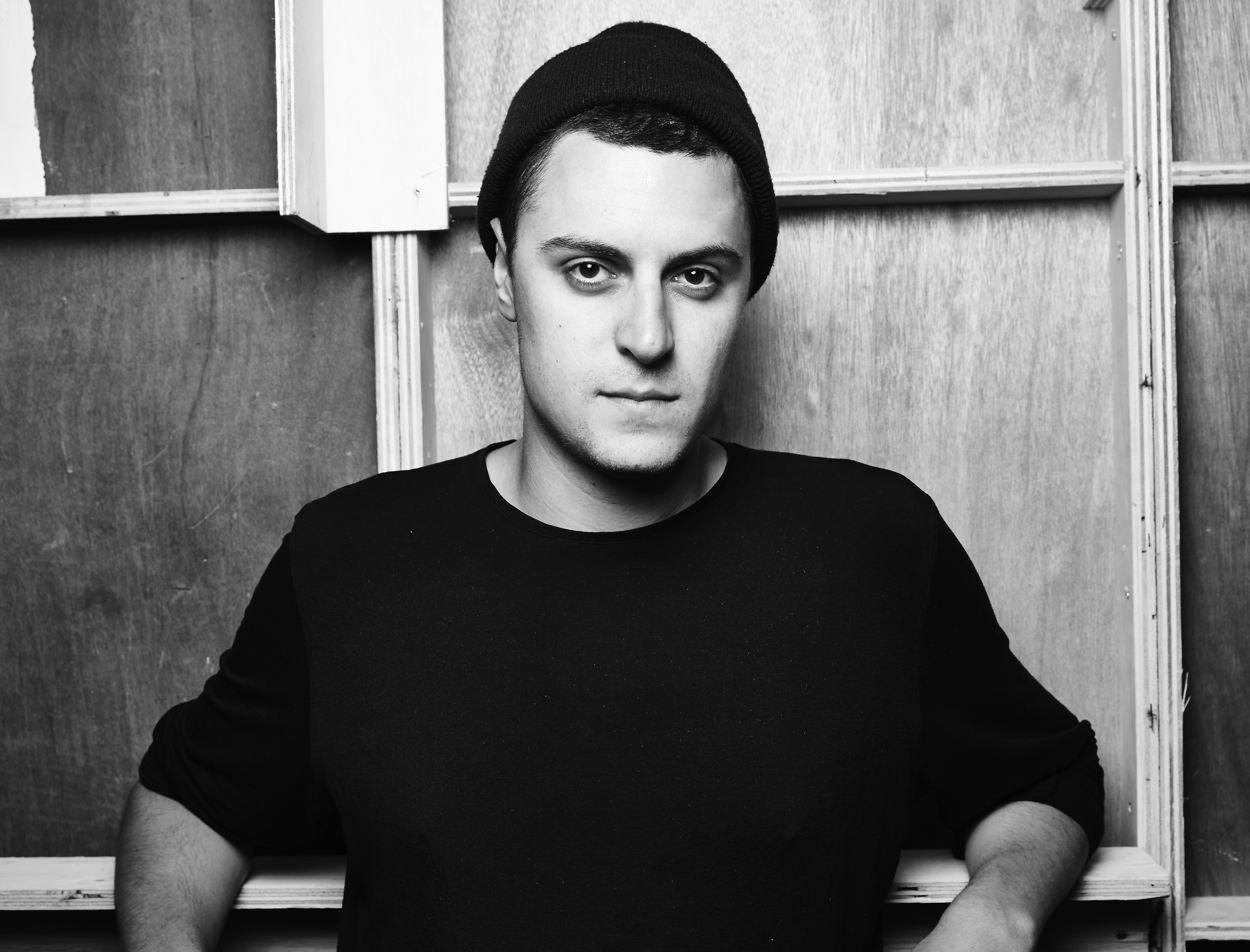
- Born: 1988 (age 37–38); Drayton Valley, Alberta, Canada
- Education: Fashion Institute of Technology
- Occupation: Fashion designer
- Awards: Canadian Arts and Fashion Awards (CAFA) Womenswear Designer of the Year, 2019 Suzanne A. Rogers Award for International Development, 2019 Canadian Arts and Fashion Awards (CAFA) Emerging Talent, 2015 Mercedes-Benz Start Up Winner, 2014 Toronto Fashion Incubator's New Labels Award Winner, 2012
- Website: www.sidneigum.com

Sid Neigum is a Canadian fashion designer. He lives and works in Toronto, Ontario.

== Early life and education ==
Sid Neigum was born and raised in Drayton Valley, an oil and gas town of 7,200 people located in the Canadian province of Alberta, to parents Marie and Darrell Neigum. According to Forbes, Neigum was 'Inspired to try running his own business by observing his father, who ran an excavation firm". Neigum also has a sister, Kailey, who is a personal trainer in Edmonton, Alberta. Neigums early interests included science, Lego, K'NEX, model rockets, and Suzuki method piano. In 2017, Sotheby's mentioned, "Neigum spent his youth playing in punk and metal bands, developing a keen fascination for musician dressing (his uniform is still all-black jeans and T-shirts, of his own design). His grandmother was a seamstress and her influence rubbed off. "Without making a pattern, she would just grab the measuring tape and whip up a dress for my sister," Neigum remembers. "I always found it interesting that she could create something from nothing in an hour."" In 2009, Sid Neigum graduated with a Diploma in Fashion Design and Apparel Production from Edmonton's MC College. After graduating, he moved to New York City to attend the Fashion Institute of Technology and intern for Yigal Azrouël.

== Career ==
In March 2011, Neigum presented his first collection at Toronto Fashion Week. One year after Neigum's first collection, in April 2012, he received the Toronto Fashion Incubator's New Labels Award, an honour accompanied by a $25,000 cash prize sponsored by Suzanne A. Rogers, free studio space at the Toronto Fashion Incubator for one year, and editorial coverage in Flare magazine. Upon receiving this Neigum moved from New York to Toronto. In 2014, he won the Mercedes-Benz Start Up Award, which included a $30,000 grant, and mentorships from Fashion magazine's editor in chief, Bernadette Morra and IMG Canada's Carolyn Quinn. That same year, Neigum's line was purchased by The Room at The Bay. In February 2015, Neigum won the Swarovski Emerging Talent Award at the Canadian Arts and Fashion Awards, which awarded $10,000 and mentorships from Natasha Koifman of NKPR Inc and Suzanne Timmins, SVP and fashion director of Hudson's Bay Company and Lord & Taylor. In September 2016, Neigum won the DHL Exported program in London, which awarded him with two fully sponsored fashion shows at London Fashion Week; he has gone on to show his collections in Dubai, Paris, New York, and Shanghai. Neigum's work has been featured in Vogue, i-D, Harper's Bazaar, Forbes, V, Vogue Italia, Women's Wear Daily, Fashion magazine, Elle, and Business of Fashion. His collections are sold at retailers such as YOOX Net-a-Porter Group, Joyce Boutique, Selfridges, La Maison Simons, and Hudson's Bay Company. In March 2020, he opened a direct to consumer e-commerce website.

In Spring 2022, Sid Neigum was featured as part of Intermix's "Be Bold" campaign. The company's vice president of marketing and creative Paula Knight said of the collection “empowering women to be bold is at the cornerstone of our brand".

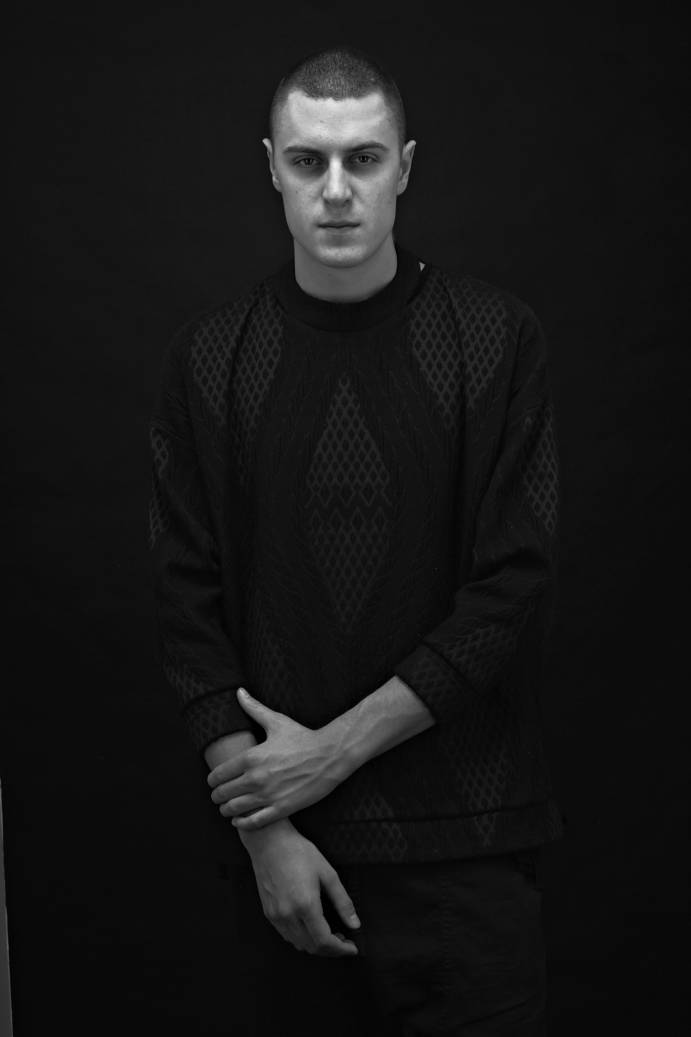
Photo by Luis Mora

== Automotive design ==
In 2017, Neigum partnered with Pfaff Automotive to create bespoke luxury vehicles. These vehicles included an Audi Q7, BMW Alpina B7, and Porsche 911 Carrera S.

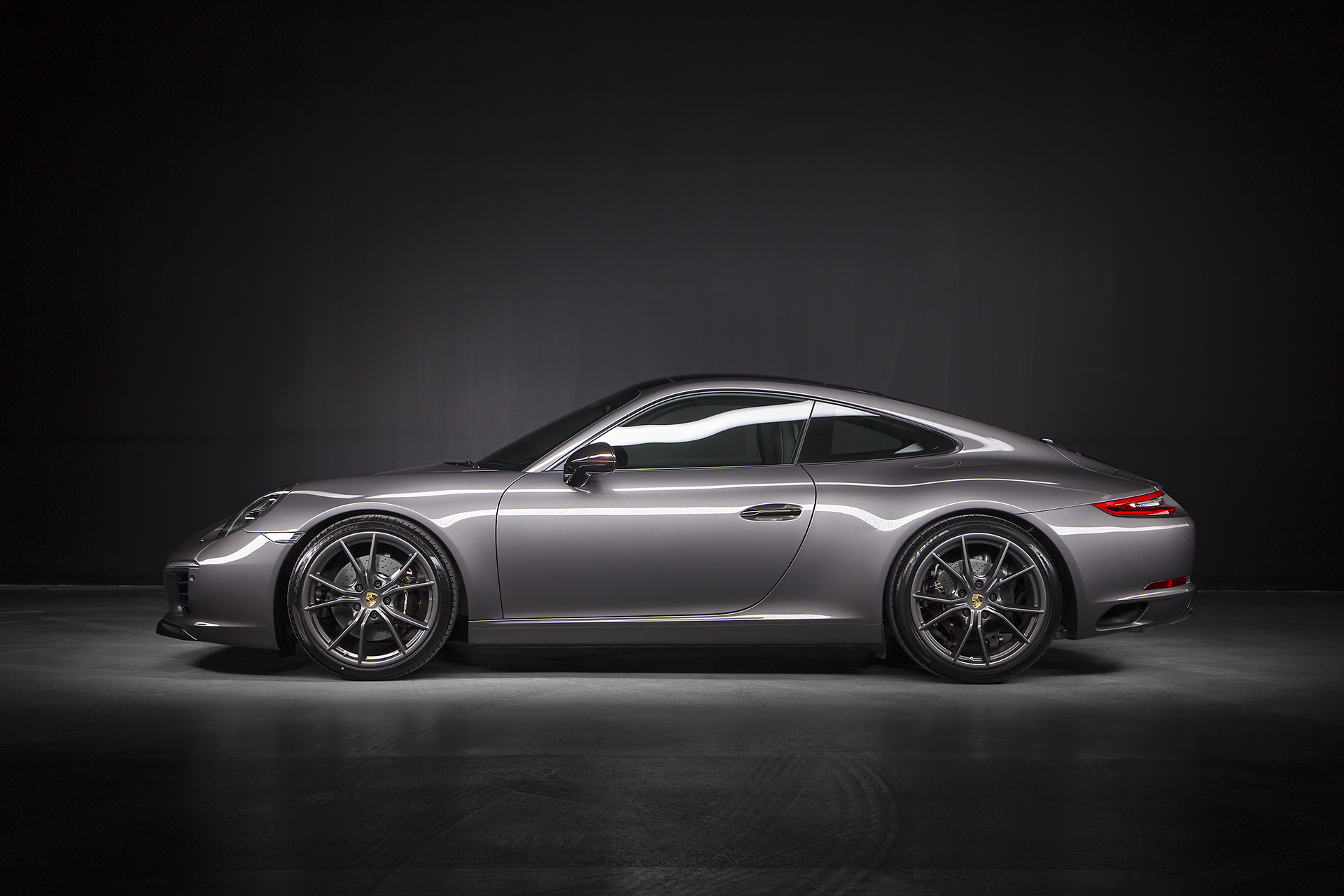
Sid Neigum Pfaff Porsche 911 S Design

== Reception ==
Nicholas Mellamphy, former buying director for The Room at The Bay was quoted saying, "Without question Sid Neigum is the most exciting Canadian designer to hit the runway in a long time." He later went on to say in an interview with Business of Fashion, "Women who are buying into big European brands like Azzedine Alaïa are also buying into Sid's collection. When a consumer has the ability to buy anyone but buys someone new, it shows that the designer has the ability to penetrate the market."

In March 2016, Maya Singer of Vogue said, "Sid Neigum is one to watch .... he's a designer as interested in creating a wardrobe as he is in indulging an intellectual pursuit."

In December 2016, Vogue named Neigum "One of 16 Designers who won 2016". Going on to say, "Neigum made his London Fashion Week debut in February with an inventive collection of sculptural gowns, camel hair capes, and rumpled jackets based on the golden ratio (1 x 1.618). ... Neigum's clothes are conceptual and avant-garde, but they make sense for real life, too."

In April 2018, Forbes said, "Neigum's approach, which reflects his mathematical bent, soon won many fans. As Vogue put it recently, "Neigum's essential passion, as a designer, is for geometry; he's an innovative patternmaker, and his work is premised on a near-religious belief in the beauty and power of the golden ratio, a proportion he diligently works through his clothes." With fashion lovers eager to buy his designs, Neigum broke $1 million in revenue as a solo entrepreneur."

In March 2019, Vogue noted, "Sid Neigum's latest collection began with Essentialism: The Disciplined Pursuit of Less, a book whose central philosophy revolves around paring things back to find the best path forward. The Canadian designer had read a translated quote from German industrial designer Dieter Rams: "Less, but better." "It changed my life and kind of became the starting point of this collection," Neigum said."

== Awards ==
2019: Canadian Arts and Fashion Awards (CAFA) Womenswear Designer of the Year

2019: Suzanne A. Rogers Award for International Development

2016: DHL Exported Award

2015: Canadian Arts and Fashion Awards The Swarovski Award for Emerging Talent, 2015

2014: Mercedes-Benz Start Up Winner

2012: Toronto Fashion Incubator's New Labels Award Winner

== Personal life ==
Sid Neigum is in a relationship with Chloe Gordon, the co-founder and fashion designer of Beaufille. Neigum is a marathon runner, and has run several marathons in Toronto, Rome, and Barcelona.
