= Christopher Bates =

Christopher Bates may refer to:

- Christopher Bates (rower), British lightweight rower
- Christopher Bates (fashion designer), Canadian menswear designer

== See also ==
- Chris Bates, American jazz bassist
