= IFCA =

IFCA may refer to:

== Religion ==
- IFCA International, formerly Independent Fundamental Churches of America, an association of independent Protestant congregations
- International Fellowship of Christian Assemblies, formerly Christian Church of North America, is a North American Pentecostal denomination
- International Forum of Catholic Action, an International Association of the Faithful

== Other uses ==
- Inshore Fisheries and Conservation Authority, in England
- International Festival of Computer Arts in Slovenia
