= Suzanne A. Rogers =

Canadian philanthropist

Suzanne Rogers
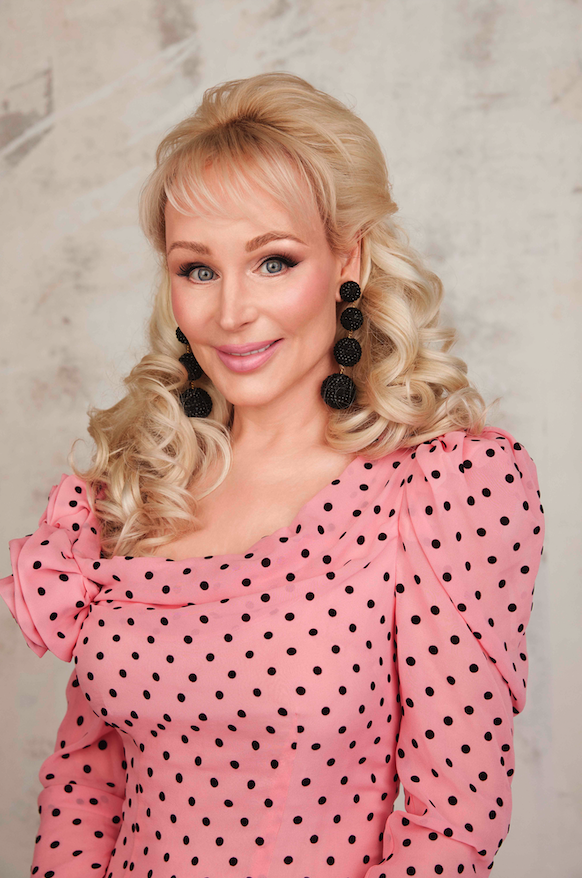
- Rogers in 2024
- Born: Suzanne Angelique Kolev; Elliot Lake, Ontario, Canada
- Education: University of Western Ontario (BA)
- Occupations: Philanthropist; fashion enthusiast
- Spouse: Edward Rogers III (m. 2006)
- Children: 3
- Relatives: Ted Rogers (father-in-law)

Suzanne Angelique Rogers (née Kolev) is a Canadian philanthropist and socialite who has been called "the Fairy Godmother of Canadian Fashion". She is married to Edward Rogers, chairman of Rogers Communications.

== Early life and family ==
Rogers was born in Elliot Lake in Northeastern Ontario. Her parents Suzanna and Miklos Kovel immigrated from Budapest, Hungary prior to her birth. in 1968, her father was tragically killed in a mining accident. The family then moved to St-Thomas where she spent most of her childhood.

She later attended the University of Western Ontario.

Rogers has spoken about the dichotomy between her family's roots in communist Hungary and her current life married to the chair of Rogers Communications. In a 2015 exclusive interview, she said that remembering her grandmother's struggles helps her to stay grounded and have “a different perspective on life”.

In an exclusive 2024 interview, Rogers discussed her early life, growing up around her parents' delicatessen in St. Thomas, Ontario. She spent a significant part of her childhood there, doing her homework at a table in the back of the shop and playing in the warehouse. Rogers credits this environment for instilling within her the values of hard work and dedication, lessons she learned from observing her parents.

Rogers has stated that fashion was a consistent presence in her life, and that during her youth she expressed her early interest in fashion by modifying and styling second-hand clothing.

== Career ==
Rogers is the founder of one of Canada's best-known fundraiser series, Suzanne Rogers Presents, which has partnered with designers including Oscar de la Renta, Marchesa, Zac Posen, Diane von Fürstenberg and Victoria Beckham. She has also provided support to Toronto's Ryerson University, Faculty of Communication and Design. In October 2016, Ryerson University founded the Suzanne Rogers Fashion Institute (SRFI) after a $1 million donation from the Edward and Suzanne Rogers Foundation to Ryerson's Faculty of Communication and Design, in addition to the SRFI Fellowship program for the faculty's students.

SRFI has supported over a dozen third- and fourth-year fashion design students by eliminating financial barriers, providing mentorship and funding. SRFI Director Robert Ott has called the program “the entry ticket to international opportunities and success”. Rogers also established the "Suzanne Rogers Designer Grant for International Development". Past recipients include Greta Constantine and Sid Neigum. Rogers also funded the $25,000 Suzanne Rogers Award for Most Promising New Label at the Toronto Fashion Incubator's annual gala.

Rogers has been recognized for “her immeasurable contributions to the fashion industry both in Canada and abroad” by the Royal Ontario Museum, one of Canada's leading cultural institutions. Rogers was presented with the museum’s inaugural Immortal Award, which is to be given annually in tribute of a trailblazer whose creativity and tenacity has forever changed their field. Coverage of the award in Canadian media, described her as "one of Canada's most visible champions of fashion and philanthropy" and noted her work in philanthropy and fashion, including her support for emerging designers, her involvement with the Suzanne Rogers Fashion Institute, and her contributions to children’s charities. Rogers received the award at the ROM’s 2025 Immortal Gala: The Art of Fashion. The event, hosted by journalist Lisa LaFlamme, included a tribute film by Barry Avrich and remarks by designer Kirk Pickersgill of Greta Constantine.

Beyond the fashion industry, Rogers is an active philanthropist. Most recently she served as Honorary Chair of Contemporary Calgary’s LOOK Gala supporting the gallery’s programs and exhibitions dedicated to modern and contemporary art. She has supported Covenant House including participating in its "sleep out" campaign to raise awareness for homelessness and by chairing Covenant House's anti human-trafficking "Just Like a Girl You Know" campaign. She was also Honorary Chair of The Butterfly Ball, in support of the Boost Child & Youth Advocacy Centre which provides services to victims of child abuse and their families. In an interview by Dolce Magazine about her work with Suzanne, Boost's executive director Karyn Kennedy was resoundingly positive saying “she doesn't just write cheques — she really puts her heart and soul in it."

In an interview with TO Waterfront Magazine, Rogers discussed her approach to philanthropy, emphasizing her focus on lesser-known charities. She stated, “There are so many smaller charities that go unnoticed that I try to bring attention to, grassroots charities that really make an impact in so many people’s lives.” Rogers actively leverages her fame to benefit these organizations, explaining, “A cheque is just a cheque. If I can get an organization to receive twenty cheques, then I think that is very impactful.”

In May 2021, Rogers posted an Instagram story with former U.S. President Donald Trump at his private club, Mar-a-Lago, in Palm Beach, Fla., captioned, "A Special Way to End the Night!" The post caused brief backlash from members of the Canadian fashion industry. In response, Rogers stated that she has “always believed in equality, diversity, inclusiveness, and respect for all.” She went on to explain that she has no relationship with Donald Trump, and that this brief encounter was the first time they met. Rogers further emphasized that she regretted posting the picture and that it does not represent her personal values.

In the fall of 2024, noting her deeps roots in the community, Rogers and her husband gave a 3 million dollar donation to the city of Elliot Lake to bolster the Centennial Arena restoration. Rogers currently serves on the board of directors for the Jays Care Foundation, the charitable arm of the Toronto Blue Jays.

On October 15, 2026, Rogers received Toronto Metropolitan University's highest honour, an honorary Doctor of Laws degree (honoris causa), recognizing her contributions to the university as well as her philanthropic efforts and contributions to the fashion industry.

== Media ==
She was featured along with her daughter in the 2013 Flare’s Icons issue, showcasing the 50 most stylish Canadians of all time, as well as Hello! Canada's 2014 list of Canada's Best Dressed.

In 2019, designer Sid Neigum said referred to Rogers as "the Fairy Godmother of Canadian Fashion".
