= Forest Hill Collegiate Institute =

Public high school in Toronto, Ontario, Canada

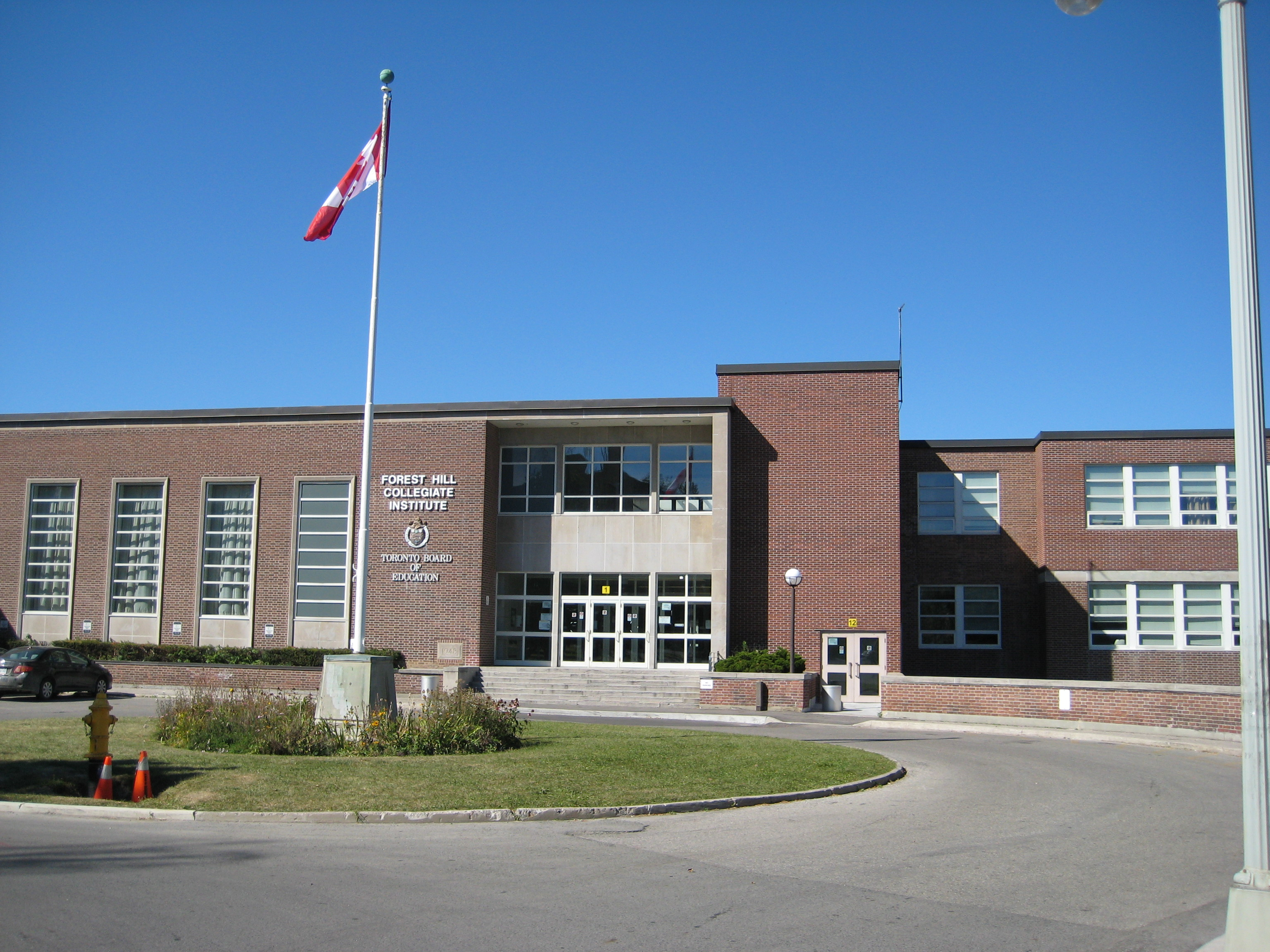
- Forest Hill C.I., pictured in 2009 with the TBE coat of arms.

Location
- 730 Eglinton Avenue West; Toronto, Ontario, M5N 1B9; Canada; 43.702976°N 79.421266°W

Information
- School type: High School
- Motto: Non Nobis Solum; Not For Ourselves Alone
- Founded: 1948
- School board: Toronto District School Board
- Superintendent: Uton Robinson; LC1, Executive; Debbie Donsky; FOS07
- Area trustee: Shelley Laskin; Ward 8
- School number: 5508 / 910641
- Principal: Yvette Duffy
- Grades: 9-12
- Language: English
- Area: Forest Hill
- Colours: Blue and gold
- Mascot: Freddy the Falcon
- Team name: Forest Hill Falcons
- Newspaper: FHCI Golden Falcon
- Website: www.fhci.net

Forest Hill Collegiate Institute (FHCI) is a public secondary school in Toronto, Ontario, Canada. It is operated by the Toronto District School Board (TDSB) and serves students in the Forest Hill neighbourhood. Before 1998, the school was part of the former Toronto Board of Education.

== History ==
Forest Hill Collegiate began in January 1948 when Grade 9 classes were first held at Forest Hill Village Public School. The school moved into its dedicated building on September 29, 1949, constructed for the Forest Hill Board of Education.

The original structure was designed by the architectural firm Page and Steele. Significant renovations took place between 1992 and 1994.

== Curriculum ==
FHCI offers the standard Ontario secondary school curriculum. Senior students may participate in cooperative education, gaining workplace experience for academic credit.

== Extracurricular activities ==
Students may take part in a range of extracurricular programs, including athletics, music ensembles, student government, and various clubs. Leadership opportunities include the student council and prefect program, which help support school events. Music-related activities are organized through a student-run music leadership group. Production crews assist in staging school performances.

=== Athletics ===
Forest Hill Collegiate Institute competes in Toronto District School Board athletics as a Tier One school. Its teams are known as the Forest Hill Falcons.

- Football
- Rugby
- Basketball
- Hockey
- Tennis
- Swimming
- Badminton
- Golf
- Field hockey
- Skiing / Snowboarding
- Track and Field

== Awards and recognition ==
- Toronto Police Chief Bill Blair attended the school's Pink Day assembly as his last appearance before stepping down.

== Notable alumni ==
- Robert Bateman, artist and naturalist
- Ralph Benmergui, broadcaster
- Neve Campbell, actress
- Noah Cappe, television host
- Ken Daniels, sportscaster
- Drake (Aubrey Graham), musician and actor
- Sharon Fichman, professional tennis player
- Rainbow Sun Francks, actor
- Shenae Grimes, actress
- Larry Grossman, politician
- Lisi Harrison, author
- Kenny Hotz and Spencer Rice, television creators of Kenny vs. Spenny
- Mia Kirshner, actress and writer
- Michael Landsberg, broadcaster
- Lorne Michaels, television producer
- Joe Mimran, fashion designer
- Vladimir Kuljanin, Canadian National Basketball Team, NC Wilmington
- Howard Lindzon, author and founder of StockTwits
- Sophie Milman, jazz singer
- David Rakoff, writer and performer
- Dani Reiss, CEO of Canada Goose
- Dan Senor, political adviser
- Barry Sherman, businessman
- Howard Shore, composer
- Dan Signer, television writer-producer
- Gail Simmons, food writer and TV host
- Tara Strong, voice actress
- Syrus Marcus Ware, artist and activist

== See also ==
- Education in Ontario
- List of secondary schools in Ontario
