= Black Designers of Canada =

Canadian non-profit organization

Black Designers of Canada is an initiative in Canada to promote diversity in the fashion industry and highlight black Canadian artists. It is a non-profit organization. The online database currently has over 160 designers listed. The interactive index was created by fashion designer George Sully. The initiative has been featured in Essence, Black Enterprise, and Elle.
