= Canada Goose Inc. =

Canadian manufacturer of cold-weather apparel

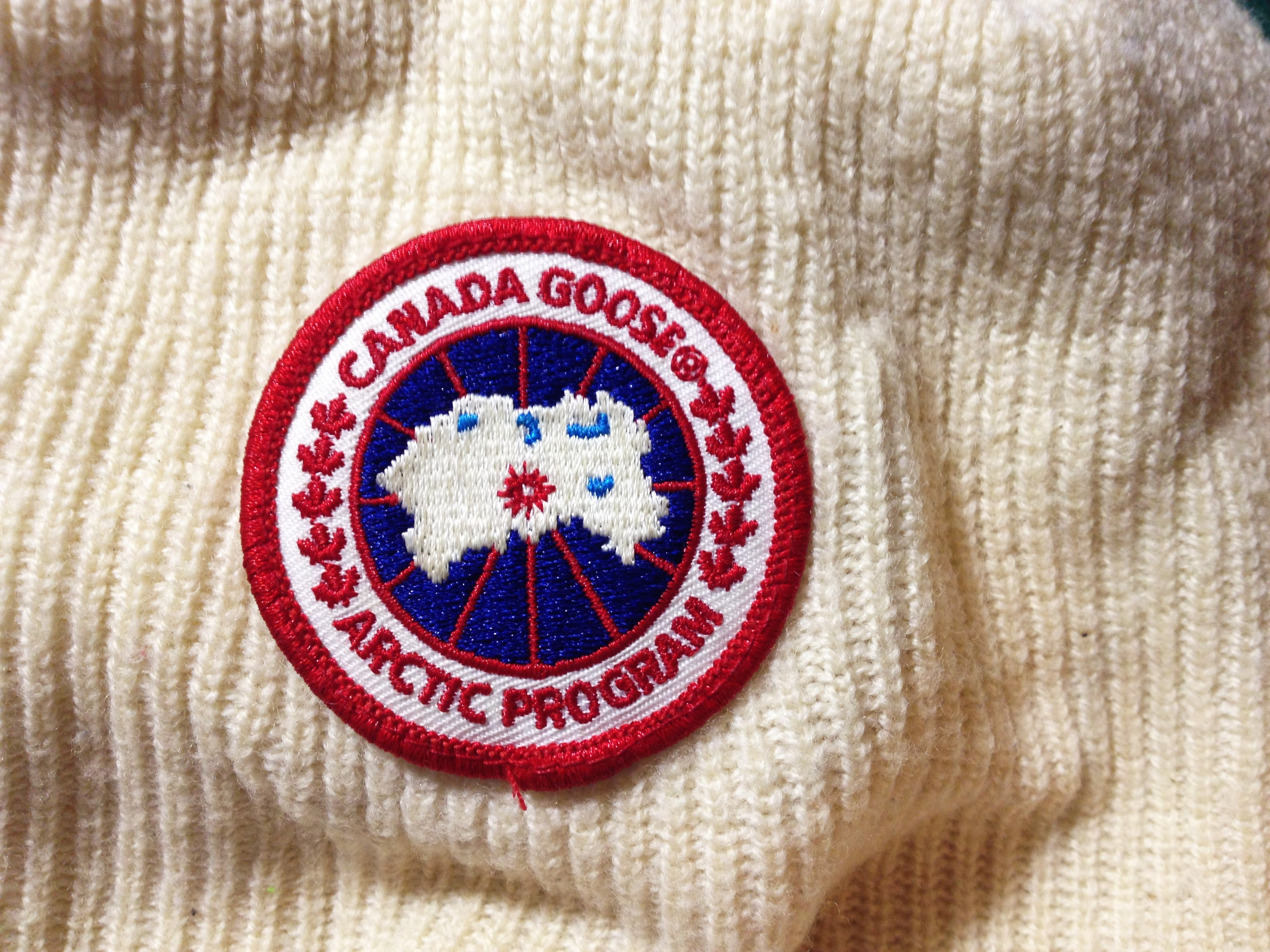
- The brand's logo on a piece of apparel
- Type: Public
- Traded as: TSX: GOOS; NYSE: GOOS
- Industry: Retail
- Genre: Winter clothing
- Founded: 1957; 69 years ago
- Founder: Sam Tick
- Headquarters: Toronto, Ontario, Canada
- Area served: Retail stores: Chicago, New York, Banff, Boston, Minneapolis, Toronto, Montreal, Calgary, Edmonton, Vancouver, Tokyo, London, Paris, Sydney, Melbourne, Frankfurt
- Key people: Dani Reiss (Chairman and CEO); Carrie Baker (President)
- Products: Outerwear; Knitwear
- Revenue: ▲CA$1.35 billion (2025)
- Operating income: ▲CA$164 million (2025)
- Net income: ▲CA$104 million (2025)
- Total assets: ▲CA$1.62 billion (2025)
- Total equity: ▲CA$557 million (2025)
- Owner: Bain Capital and others
- Number of employees: 3,942 (2025)
- Website: canadagoose.com
- Footnotes; Financials as of March 30, 2025.

Canada Goose Inc. is a Canadian holding company of winter clothing manufacturers. The company was founded in 1957 by Sam Tick, under the name Metro Sportswear Ltd. The CEO of Canada Goose is Dani Reiss.

== History ==
In 1957, Polish-Jewish immigrant Sam Tick founded Metro Sportswear, the company that would later become Canada Goose. The company's first products were wool vests, raincoats, and snowsuits. Tick's son-in-law David Reiss joined Metro Sportswear in 1972 and introduced a down-filling machine that allowed the company to produce winter jackets more efficiently.

By the late 1970s, the company was supplying parkas to police, corrections officers, park rangers, and other public sector workers under the Snow Goose brand name. It also sold designs to larger apparel manufacturers such as L.L.Bean and Eddie Bauer. In 1982, Reiss succeeded Tick as the company's CEO. In 1985, Reiss acquired a majority stake in the company and changed its name to Snow Goose.

In 1997, David's son Dani Reiss joined the company, initially working in sales. In 2000, at Dani Reiss's suggestion, the company changed its name from Snow Goose to Canada Goose. The following year, Dani Reiss took over from his father as CEO of the company. Under Dani Reiss' leadership, the company discontinued its private label operations to focus mainly on marketing products under its own brand. The business saw rapid growth around the turn of the millennium and revenues increased from roughly $3 million in 1991 to roughly $17.5 million in 2008.

=== 21st century ===
In 2010 Canada Goose opened an office in Stockholm, Sweden, for its European operations. In 2011, Canada Goose acquired a new plant in Winnipeg, Manitoba, Canada. As global growth continued, Canada Goose moved its Winnipeg operations into a larger facility in 2013. This growth occurred when the luxury parka market grew significantly, with Canadian luxury apparel brands, including Canada Goose, aggressively marketing their parkas to young Canadians.

In January 2012, Canada Goose launched a lawsuit for trademark infringement against International Clothiers in the Federal Court of Canada. Canada Goose accused International Clothiers of intentionally designing a logo and positioning it on jackets to mimic the Canada Goose Arctic Program trademark. The International Clothiers product lines in question were the foreign-manufactured Canada Weather Gear and Super Triple Goose. Canada Goose maintained that the unfair business practices included the publication of misleading print advertisements. A settlement was reached in November 2012.

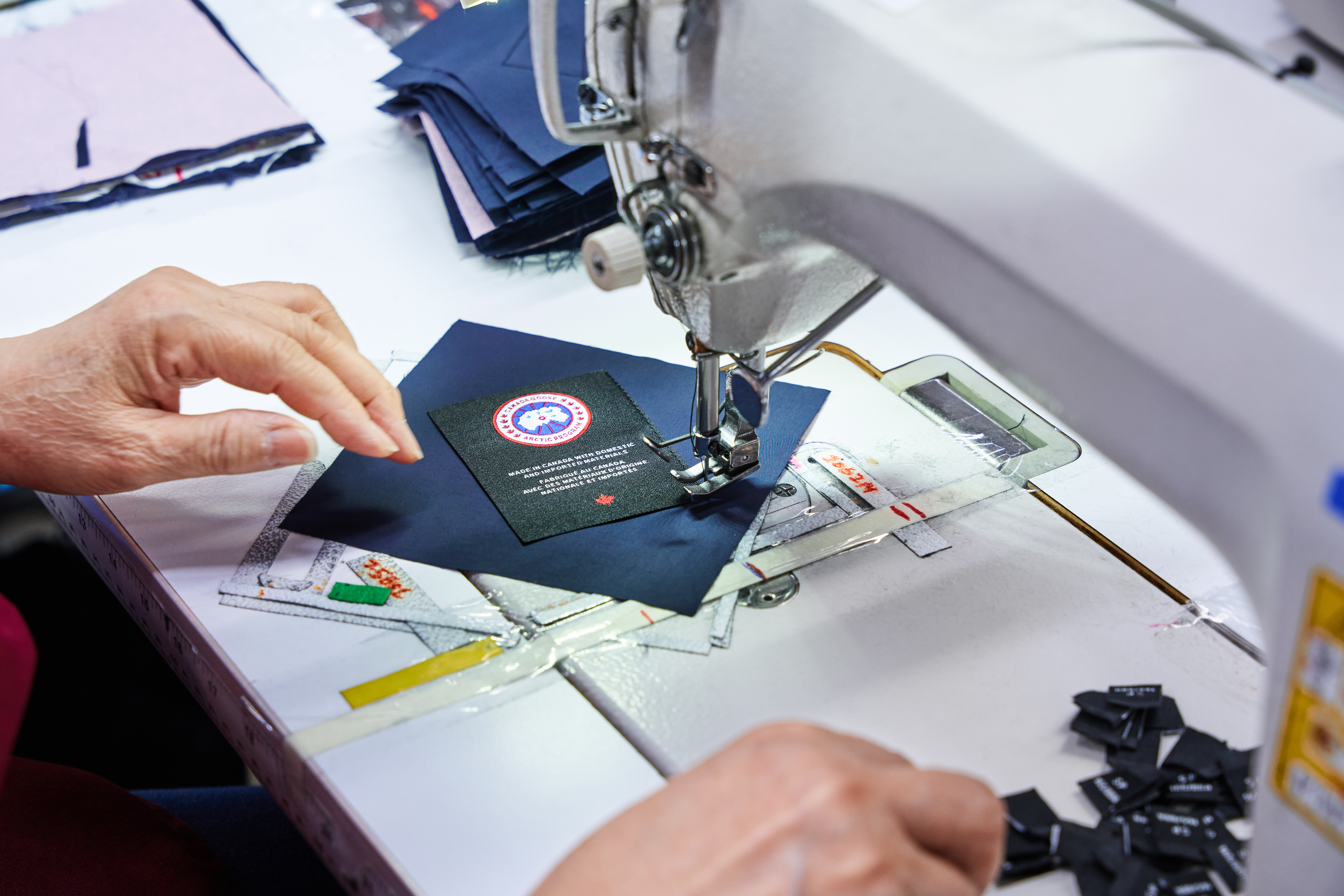
A seamstress sewing the brand label onto a piece of fabric at the Canada Goose manufacturing plant in Toronto

In December 2013, US private equity firm Bain Capital acquired a 70 per cent equity stake in Canada Goose, which was valued at $250 million. The deal included a commitment to keep manufacturing in Canada. At the time, the company had grown to approximately 1,000 employees and had recently opened new manufacturing plants in Toronto and Winnipeg. In December 2014, Canada Goose opened a showroom and sales office in New York City. From 2001 to 2014, the company's sales revenue had grown from $3 million to $200 million.

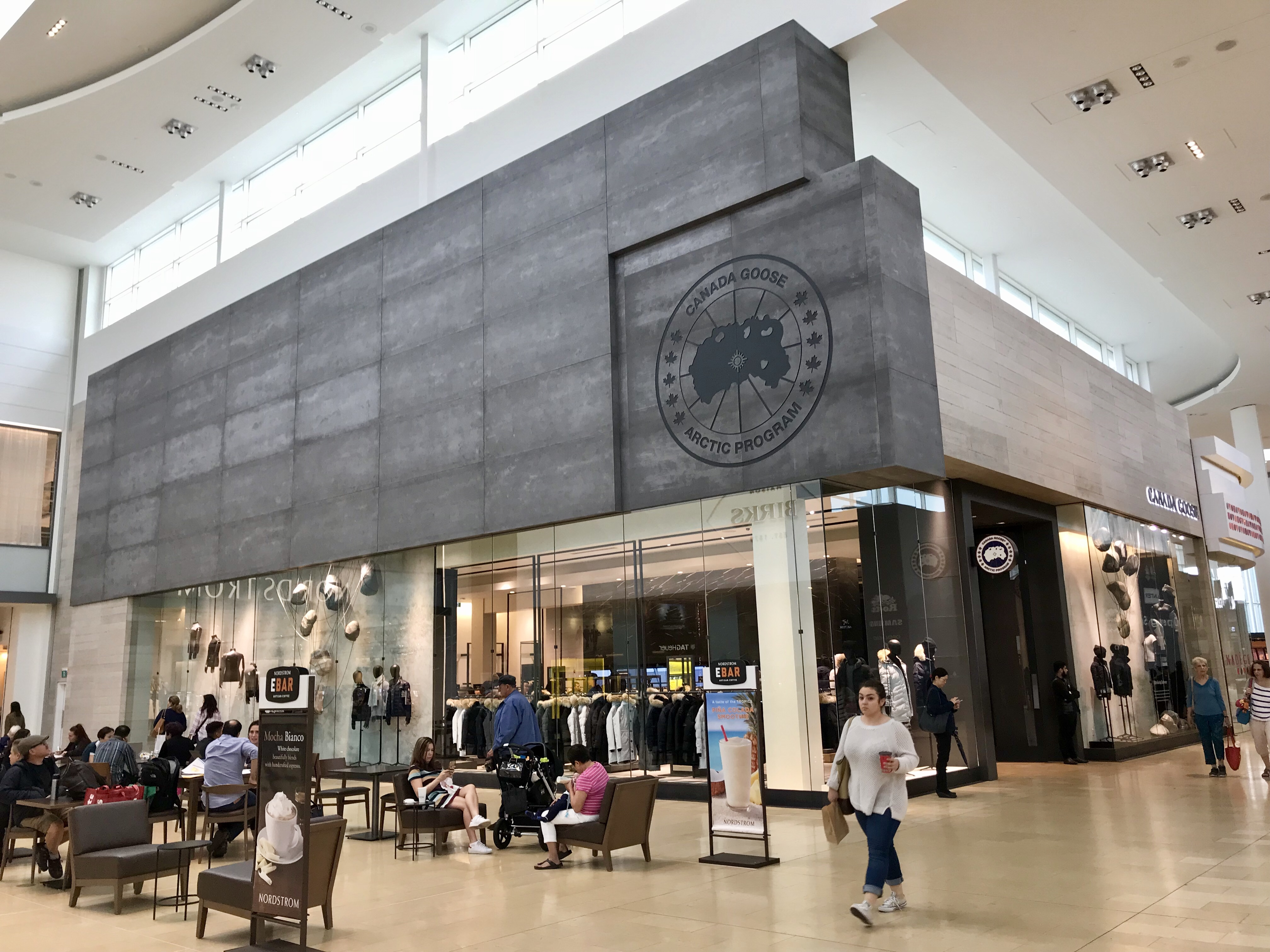
Storefront for Canada Goose at Yorkdale Shopping Centre in 2017

In January 2015, Canada Goose acquired a second manufacturing facility in Scarborough and opened a second factory in Winnipeg that November. In late 2016, Canada Goose opened a store in Toronto's Yorkdale Shopping Centre.

The company announced preparations in November 2016 for an initial public offering, reporting that it generated $291 million in revenue and $27 million in profit in 2016 and had $278 million in debt. On March 16, 2017, shares of the company began trading on the Toronto Stock Exchange and New York Stock Exchange under the ticker symbol GOOS. The IPO comprised 20 million shares offered at approximately $13 per share, generating total proceeds of approximately $255 million.

In June 2017, Canada Goose opened its first manufacturing facility in Quebec, a 95,000 square foot facility in Boisbriand. In October 2017, Canada Goose opened its second United States flagship store on the Magnificent Mile in Chicago.

A third Winnipeg-based Canada Goose manufacturing plant opened in September 2018. This facility brought Canada Goose's employee count in Winnipeg to 1,700 workers. Two months later, the company expanded into China, despite calls to boycott Canadian products over the arrest of Huawei CFO Meng Wanzhou in Canada. It established a store in Beijing, opening in December 2018. In May 2019, the company opened its eighth Canadian production facility and first in Montreal.

In May 2024, Canada Goose appointed Haider Ackermann as its first creative director.

== Products ==
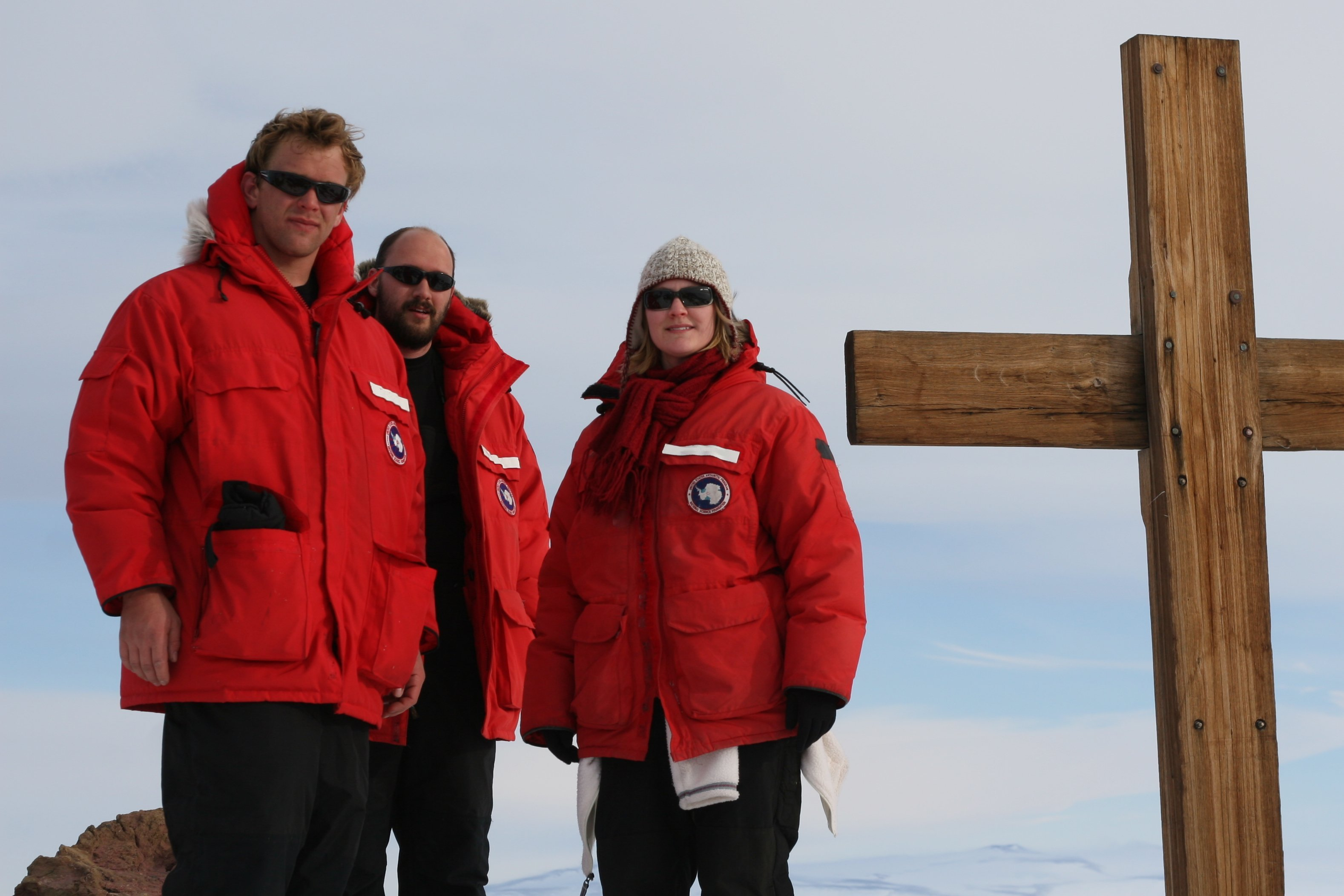
Members of the United States Antarctic Program in Canada Goose parkas at Observation Hill in Antarctica

Canada Goose manufactures outerwear and apparel, including coats, parkas, knitwear, hats, gloves and footwear. Its longest-running products are its parkas, which are meant to keep the wearer warm in freezing temperatures. These coats have been worn by researchers in the United States Antarctic Program and in dogsledding events such as the Iditarod and the Yukon Quest In November 2018, the company acquired the bootmaker Baffin. In November 2021, Canada Goose launched its first-ever footwear collection. In August 2026, the company announced the sale of its Baffin footwear brand to Royer, a manufacturer specializing in work and military footwear.

The brand is known for its distinctive logo, which resembles an arctic map of the North Pole encircled by red text that reads "CANADA GOOSE" on top and "ARCTIC PROGRAM" along the bottom. This badge is usually placed on the upper arm of a coat or jacket. The company does not outsource its manufacturing or license its brand to other manufacturers, and brands its products as "Made in Canada". Its manufacturing facilities are based in Canada.

=== Counterfeiting ===
To combat counterfeiting, Canada Goose has set up a web page that verifies whether Canada Goose goods sold by a particular vendor are authentic or not. Fake Canada Goose Jackets are among the counterfeit items being handled by Project Chargeback, a collaboration between the Canadian Anti-Fraud Centre, credit-card companies, and banks, to scrutinize online merchant accounts. In 2011, Canada Goose began sewing hologram trademarks into its jackets as an anti-counterfeiting measure.

In October 2012, Canada Goose won a legal battle against counterfeiters in Sweden. The District Court of Stockholm found five individuals guilty of felony fraud, trademark infringement and customs offences. The Court sentenced two of the defendants to prison sentences and awarded Canada Goose damages of 701,000 SEK (approximately CAD$105,000).

=== Sustainability ===
In 2023, the company launched Generations, a platform intended to keep its products in circulation by allowing consumers to trade in and purchase previously owned Canada Goose apparel.

== Environmental and social impact ==
In 2019, Canada Goose instituted a program called Project Atigi, through which it has partnered with Inuit seamstresses across Canada to produce jackets and parkas. Proceeds from the sale of this outerwear go to the Canadian nonprofit organization Inuit Tapiriit Kanatami.

As the COVID-19 pandemic was developing in March 2020, Canada Goose produced 2.5 million PPE units, which were delivered at cost to provincial and federal governments. In June 2020, the company announced it was donating another 20,000 uniforms to personnel at eight Mount Sinai hospitals in New York.

=== Treatment of animals ===
Canada Goose has been criticized by animal rights groups and anti-fur advocates for the use of goose down and coyote fur in the construction of its jackets. In 2015, a group called Animal Justice Canada filed a complaint with the Competition Bureau of Canada claiming that the trapping methods used by Canada Goose's coyote fur suppliers were inhumane. In March 2017, PETA bought 230 shares of the company so it could propose a shareholder resolution at Canada Goose's next annual meeting to "ask them to abandon the cruel use of fur and feathers."

In April 2020, the company announced that by 2022, all of the fur in its jackets would be sourced from reclaimed coyote fur already existing within supply chains. In June 2021, Canada Goose amended that plan, announcing it would stop using fur entirely by 2022. As of October 2024, Canada Goose continued to use fur. PETA subsequently suspended its international campaign against Canada Goose, while still urging the manufacturer not to use goose down in its jackets. In November 2021, the company's goods achieved the Responsible Down Standard, a certification that ensures feathers in Canada Goose jackets are sourced, according to certifying body the Environmental and Ethical Certification Institute, from "farms that respect animal welfare".

== In popular culture ==
Canada Goose has used product placement to promote its products. The jackets have been worn in several films, starting with The Day After Tomorrow. American model Kate Upton appeared on the cover of the 2013 Sports Illustrated Swimsuit edition in a bikini bottom and a Canada Goose parka. The Sports Illustrated cover was later parodied in an ad for Moose Knuckles, another Canadian appareller and competitor to Canada Goose.

In 2016, rapper Lil Uzi Vert released a mixtape featuring a song titled "Canadian Goose".

Professional athletes have also promoted Canada Goose. During Boston Red Sox designated hitter David Ortiz's final trip to Toronto during the 2016 Major League Baseball season, Toronto Blue Jays players José Bautista and Edwin Encarnación each gave Ortiz a custom-made Canada Goose jacket, valued at US$1000.

In 2020, amidst the COVID-19 pandemic, actor Ryan Reynolds and Canada Goose donated parkas for 300 students in Arctic Bay, Nunavut.
