= Valentin Stefanoff =

Bulgarian painter

- Born: 1959 (age 66–67); Sofia, Bulgaria
- Education: National Academy of Fine Arts, Sofia
- Known for: Video art, video installation, photography, drawing, printmaking, painting, photography
- Awards: The annual UNESCO Prize for the Arts 2002
- Website: www.ninavale.com

Valentin Stefanoff (born 1959, Sofia, Bulgaria) is a French-Bulgarian artist. He lives and works in France.

== Biography ==
Valentin Stefanoff was born in Sofia, Bulgaria. He studied at the Sofia Art School and subsequently at the National Academy of Fine Arts Sofia where he graduated in 1985. His works cover the fields of photography, drawing, printmaking, painting, objects, video and video installations.

Between the late 1980s and the early 1990s, Stefanoff focused on printmaking. With his first participation in The International Print Biennial Varna, he was awarded the First Prize. After 1995, Stefanoff's focus shifted to installations, videos, photographs, and objects. He works with materials such as plexiglass, wax, glass, and metal. His works often rely on the interplay between ghostly transparency and physical density contingent on the shadows thrown over the objects. Sound and text are also a key component of his art.

Stafanoff's artistic career also includes a fruitful cooperation with Nina Kovacheva, his spouse, especially with video and video installations in public and museum spaces. Their collaborative works are signed as ninavale. For the installation 'In the Out', at the 4th Biennial of Contemporary Art 2002 in Cetinje, Montenegro, NINA Kovacheva and Stefanoff were awarded the UNESCO annual prize for art.

== Selected solo exhibitions ==
- 2020 'Paradise is temporarily closed, God', Kultum, Graz, Austria (ninavale)
- 2019 H2O / 2H2O, 359 Gallery, Sofia, Bulgaria (ninavale)
- 2018 0 for Black 1 for White, Sofia City Art Gallery, Bulgaria (ninavale)
- 2018 The temptations of ninavale, Sofia - Arsenal, Museum of Contemporary Art, Sofia, Bulgaria, (ninavale)
- 2018 0 for Black 1 for White, Sofia City Art Gallery, Sofia, Bulgaria (ninavale)
- 2017 The temptations of ninavale, National Gallery of Macedonia, Skopje, Macedonia (ninavale)
- 2012 Physics and Metaphysics of the Dark Spot, Arosita Gallery, Sofia, Bulgaria, (ninavale)
- 2010 Surplus Enjoyment, Museum of Contemporary Art Taipei, Taiwan (ninavale)
- 2006 Play for Two Hands and Black, video installation on the facade of Academy of Fine Arts, Sofia, Bulgaria (ninavale)
- 2008 Au-delà de ce qui est visible, MNAC National Museum of Contemporary Art, Bucharest, Romania (ninavale)
- 2005 Phases of Accumulation and Extraction in a Limited Space, National Art Gallery, Sofia, Bulgaria, (ninavale)
- 2003 Currency, Galerie Mabelle Semler, Pars, France
- 2000 Open-Close, Museum for Modern and Contemporary Art, Belgrade, Serbia
- 1998 Identifications of the Space II, Gallery Luc Queyrel, Paris, France
- 1994 6 x 4 x 16, Galerie Bernard Jordan, Paris, France

== Selected group exhibitions ==
- 2017 Le Musée a 30 ans! Musée d'Art Moderne et Contemporain, Saint Étienne, France
- 2017 Forms of Coexistence, Structura Gallery, Sofia, Bulgaria
- 2017 Distinction, Guo Zhong Art Museum, Beijing, China
- 2015 Art for Change 1985-2015, Sofia City Art Gallery, Bulgaria
- 2012 A Possible History, City Art Sofia Gallery, Bulgaria
- 2012 Why Duchamp? From object to museum and back, Sofia Arsenal - Museum for Contemporary Art, Sofia, Bulgaria
- 2010 Close Encounter, Jeju Museum of Art, South Korea
- 2008 Shifting Identity, Li Space, 798, Beijing, China
- 2008 Micro-Narratives, Musee d'Art Modern et Contemporain, Saint Étienne, France
- 2008 La 4eme biennale d'art contemporain de Québec
- 2008 European Attitude, Zendai MoMA Shanghai, China
- 2007 Face, ZONE Chelsea Center for the Arts, New York, USA
- 2007 Desire and Resistance Determine the Motion, Musée d’Art Modern et Contemporain, Strasbourg, France
- 2007 Micro-narratives, October Salon, Belgrade, Serbia
- 2006 Phases of Accumulation and Extraction in a Limited Space, Musée d’Art Modern et Contemporain, Strasbourg, France
- 2007 ASIA – EUROPE Mediations, National Museum of Poznan, Poland
- 2005 Two Asias, Two Europes, Shanghai Duolun Museum of Modern Art, China
- 2004 Sometimes close is more open then open … Centre d'Art Contemporain, Anemas, France
- 2004 Nuit Blanche, Paris, France
- 2004 Cosmopolis, Macedonian Museum of Contemporary Art, Thessaloniki, Greece
- 2003 Export - Import, Sofia City Art Gallery, Bulgaria
- 2002 Die Beherrschung der Natur, Kunsthalle, Hannover, Germany

== Collections ==
Stefanoff's works are included in the following permanent collections: Bibliothèque Nationale de France, Victoria and Albert Museum, London, Albertina collection Vienna, Museum of Contemporary Art Taipei, Musée d'art moderne (Saint-Étienne) France, European Investment Bank Luxembourg, National Art Gallery, Bulgaria, The City Art Gallery-Sofia.

== Bibliography ==
- Surplus Enjoyment, 2015. ISBN 9789549241655.
- Valentin Stefanoff & NINA Kovacheva, ArtPress 309, Feb 2005 page 89
- Close Encounter Jeju museum of Art publisher – Kim Tae-Eon (director, Jeju Museum of Art) pages 153,154,156,157
- Art China, Vol 2 page 63 ISBN 9787806725313
- Central Europe Revisited III - Druckerei Bzoch – Austria pages 54,55
- Spectacle – to each his own Museum of Contemporary Art, Taipei ISBN 9789573002796 pages 112,113,114,115
- Mediation Biennale - Poligrafia Janusz Novwak ISBN 9788392466642 pages 206,207
