= Kibla =

Multimedia facility based in Slovenia

Logo of KIBLA

KIBLA, or Kibla, is a multimedia and multidisciplinary art production facility in Slovenia that organizes a year-round cultural program. It is a member of the Slavic Culture Forum and is involved in showcasing, distributing, and promoting the activities of 16 multimedia centers across Slovenia.

== Programmes ==
- Cyber provides free internet access as well as free internet-related courses via website architecture, programs, and hardware.
- The Student Resource Centre provides information on national and international scholarship foundations, publications, and media inquiries using an online database.
- KiBela is a multipurpose room for a cultural program as well as a space for displaying multimedia art.
- Hidden Notes (Skrite note) is a musical series that features concerts, projections, talks, and workshops, including electroacoustic music.
- IT@K – IT at Kibla is an online and multimedia lab for the development of websites, CD-ROMs, video, audio, and real-time internet transmissions.
- Videla is for digital video processing, education, courses, presentations and workshops.
- Za:misel (For:thought) is a bookstore for sociology and humanistic studies with a regular program of book presentations and literary evenings.
- Mimogrede (By The Way) – bimonthly with information about studying abroad and in Slovenia.
- LED display is for information about MMC KIBLA and programmes.
- TOX magazine is a time-table through 3000, magazine (from 1995) that grew into the KIBLA publishing edition (from 1998), made several catalogues and books, e.g., Eduardo Kac: Telepresence, Biotelematics, Transgenic Art, Vili Ravnjak: The Amber way, Aleksandra Kostič's edited essays on Levitation, catalogues for Marko Jakše, Marko Črtanec, Mitjja Ficko, Theo Botscuijver, Shuzo Azuchi Gulliver, several CDs (Nino Mureškič, Vasko Atanasovski, Siti hlapci, and CD-ROMs (for EU project European Multimedia Accelerator-EMMA) and DVDs for EU project txoOm.
- Communication-information point KIT in Maribor City Hall (Rotovž), Glavni trg 14, where there are eight computer terminals and a multimedia classroom with ten computers and additional IT equipment.

=== Festivals ===
- Day of Curiosity – an annual educational festival on career choices.
- Izzven – a three-day contemporary music festival focused on collaboration projects.
- Kiblix – IT Linux festival – a festival about open source, consists of topics such as mobile technologies, open source, security on the Internet, and Linux.

=== Special programs ===
- Committee for Vine Service – degustations, education, information service and excursions.

== International cooperation ==
Kibla is working on the EC-Culture 2000 (txOom, TransArtDislocated, Soziale Geraeusche, and Virtual Centre Media Net), FP5-IST (EMMA – European Multimedia Accelerator) and FP6-IST (PATENT – Partnership for Telecommunication New Technologies) funded programmes and projects. The corporation is also a part of the EUREKA multimedia umbrella and finished Leonardo da Vinci-supported project NAME multimedia - the Multimedia Tasks & Skills Database covering and evaluating 26 different jobs and 96 operational multimedia tasks. NAME is presented in 9 languages, with a database of more than 650 companies from 11 countries.

In 2005, KIBLA partnered with EU-Culture 2000 and finished 2 new projects: e-Agora, which developed a virtual multimedia platform; and TRG – Transient reality generators, that focuses on mixed reality and examines a synaesthetic MR experience design.

== See also ==
- Opace
- NKPR Inc
