= Susan Langdon =

Chief executive of the Toronto Fashion Incubator

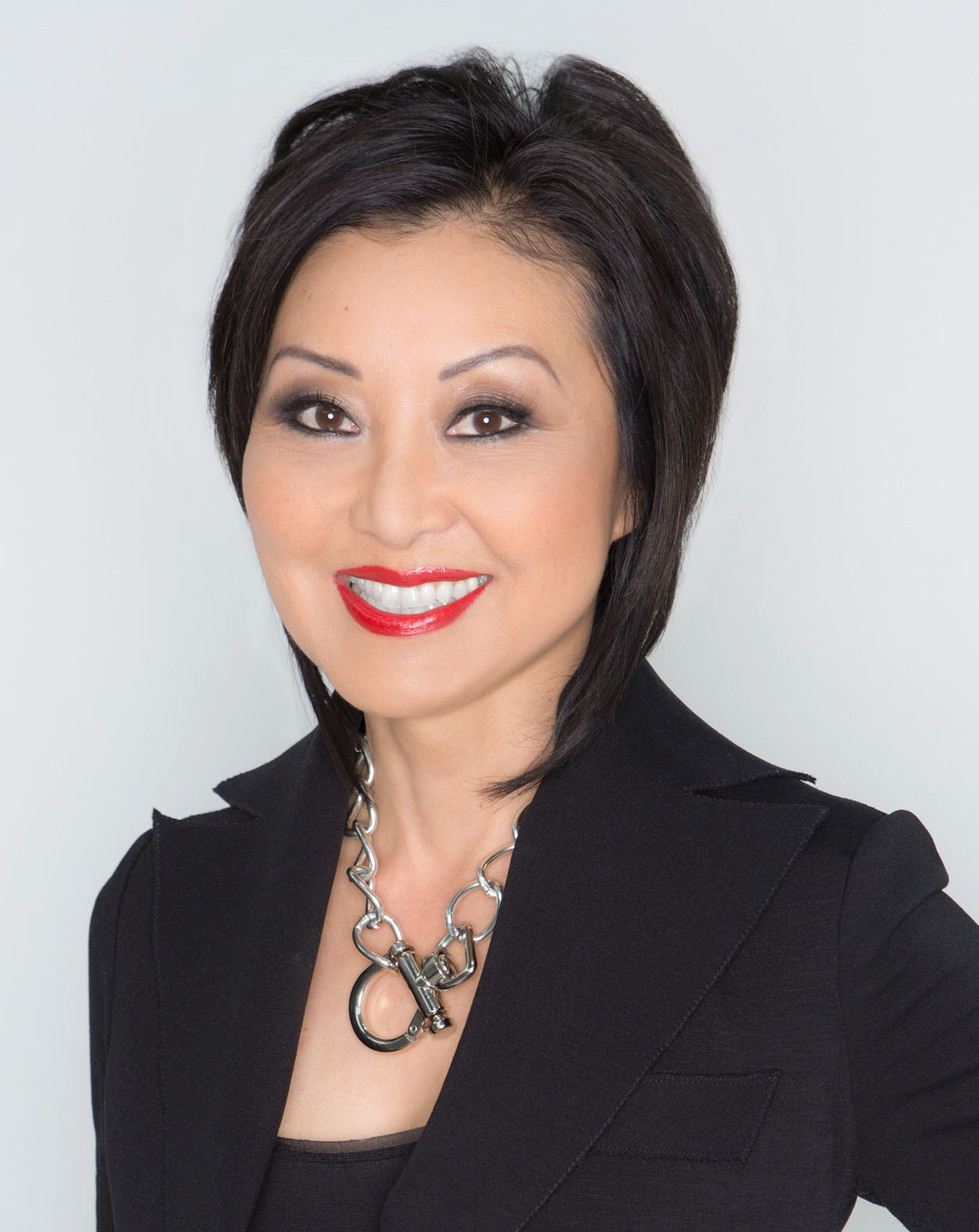
- Born: Toronto, Ontario Canada
- Education: Ryerson University
- Occupation: CEO
- Awards: 1996: City of Toronto Excellence in Fashion Industry Achievement Award; 1998: Inducted into Ryerson University's hall of fame; 1998: Ryerson University's Alumni Award of Distinction; 2005: JoAnna Townsend Award from the Organization of Women in International Trade; 2021: Order of Canada

Susan Langdon is the CEO of the Toronto Fashion Incubator (TFI).

== Career ==
Langdon attended Ryerson University and completed the Fashion Design program. During the 1980s, she launched a line of clothes with the help of a financial backer. Sales reached $500,000 in her first season of activity. Langdon is the chief executive of the Toronto Fashion Incubator since 1994 where she has mentored many Canadian fashion designers, including David Dixon, Sunny Fong of Project Runway Canada, Joeffer Caoc, Sid Neigum, Foxy Originals, Jenny Bird, Arthur Mendonça, Laura Siegel, Line Knitwear and Smythe.

== Awards ==
- 1996: City of Toronto Excellence in Fashion Industry Achievement Award
- 1998: Ryerson University's Alumni Award of Distinction and inducted into the university's hall of fame
- 2005: JoAnna Townsend Award from the Organization of Women in International Trade
- 2015: Fashion Group International Visionary Award
- 2021: Order of Canada for her services to Canadian fashion
- Woolmark Award of Distinction and Concours Design Award
