= Carla Rockmore =

Canadian-American fashion stylist

- Born: June 12, 1967 (age 59); Montreal, Quebec, Canada
- Occupations: Fashion stylist jewelry designer

Carla Rockmore is a Canadian-American fashion stylist and jewelry designer based in Dallas, Texas. She rose to prominence for herTikTok videos that center fashion for women over 50.

== Career ==
Rockmore has worked in fashion her entire professional life, first as a fashion designer for 20 years before she transitioned into jewelry design. She characterized her style as eclectic and a mix of Iris Apfel and Carrie Bradshaw. She has been noted for her perspective as a woman over fifty.

After the onset of the COVID-19 pandemic she made fashion-related YouTube videos to entertain friends sheltering in place. Her profile grew tremendously when she created a TikTok at the encouragement of her daughter Ivy. She amassed 540,000 followers after four months on the platform. Her videos share style tips and outfit ideas, usually featuring clothing from Rockmore's closet. Carina Chocano described the effect of the videos in The New York Times, "those of us unable to “shop” our closets as though they were luxury stores can do so vicariously in Rockmore’s. Her wardrobe also has the other appeal of a museum: it feels archival, historical, not amassed but curated."

In May 2022, she partnered with Amazon's The Drop to design and release an online collection, Carla Rockmore x The Drop. She independently released a capsule collection in May 2023. In 2024 she developed a brand partnership with QVC.

== Personal life ==
Rockmore was born in Montreal, Quebec.

Rockmore is married. She, her husband, and their two children have lived in Dallas since 2012. Rockmore has used her platform to create videos with her daughter, Ivy, to share information about Ivy's gender transition.
