= Dani Reiss =

Canadian Businessman (born 1973)

Dani Reiss CM
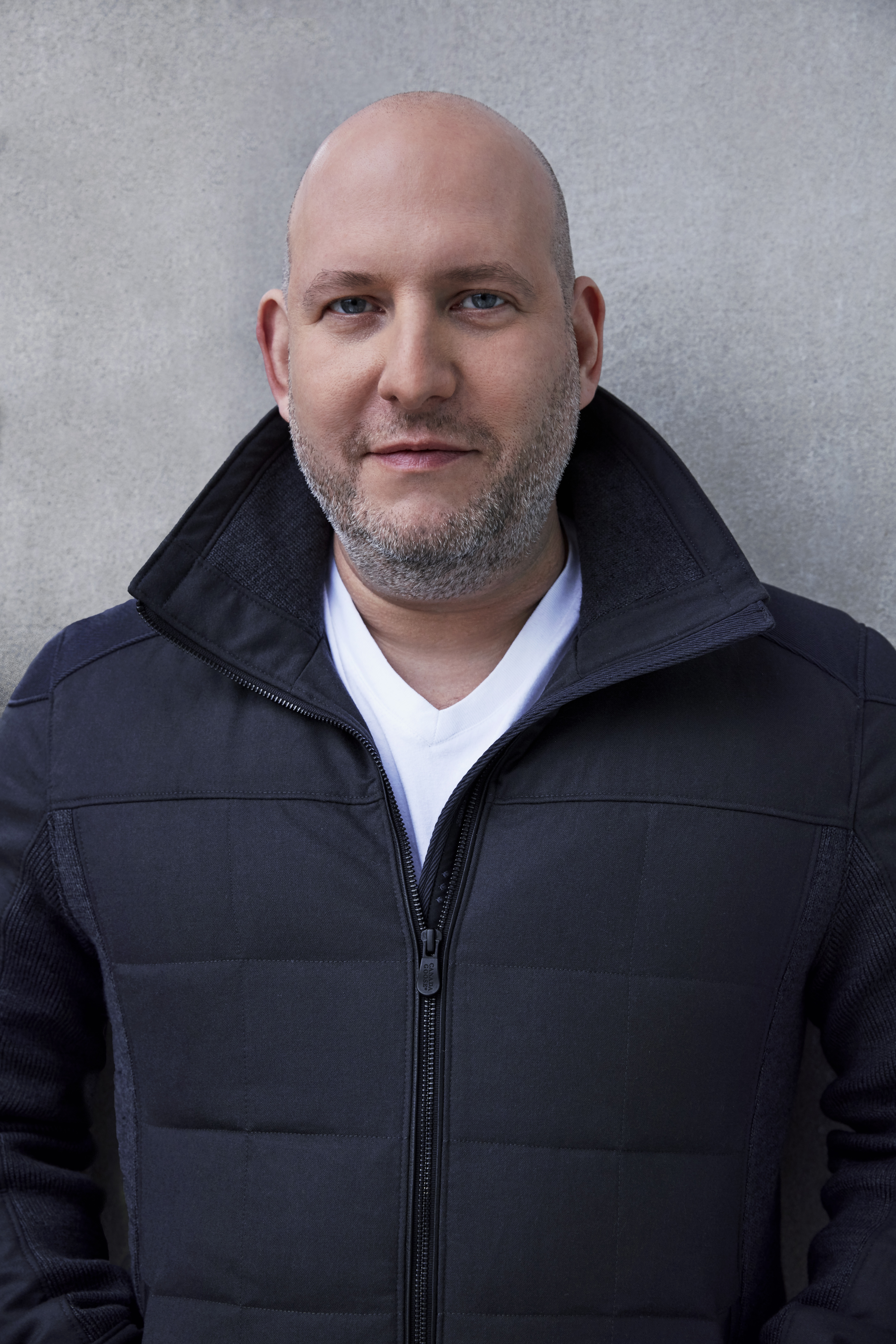
- Born: November 7, 1973 (age 53)
- Education: University of Toronto (BA)
- Occupations: CEO, Canada Goose Inc.
- Spouse: Erica Reiss
- Children: 2

Dani Reiss CM (born November 7, 1973) is a Canadian businessman. He is best known for his role as CEO of Canadian clothing company Canada Goose. As of April 2021, his net worth was estimated at US$1.2 billion.

== Early life and education ==
Reiss is the son of Malca (née Tick) and David Reiss. His maternal grandfather, Samuel Tick, founded Canada Goose in 1957 under the name Metro Sportswear.

He was educated at Forest Hill Collegiate Institute, Toronto. During his high school years, Reiss spent the summer months working for the family business. He received a bachelor of arts degree in English literature and philosophy from the University of Toronto, where he attended Woodsworth College.

== Career ==
In 1997, Reiss joined the sales division of his family business. The company rebranded as Canada Goose in 2000 after he suggested its name be changed from Snow Goose.

Reiss succeeded his father as president and CEO of Canada Goose in 2001. When Bain Capital bought a majority stake in the company in 2013, Reiss secured a guarantee from Bain that Canada Goose would continue to make its products in Canada. Under Reiss, the company opened manufacturing plants in Toronto, Winnipeg, and Montreal.

== Social engagement ==
In 2011, he was named Canada's Entrepreneur of the Year by Ernst & Young. Reiss was appointed to the 2016 Order of Canada and the 2019 Order of Ontario In 2019, Reiss was recognized as the Globe and Mail's Global Visionary of the Year. In 2022, Reiss was inducted into Canada's Marketing Hall of Legends by the American Marketing Association. In 2023, Reiss received the Outstanding Achievement Award at the Canadian Arts and Fashion Awards.

In 2023, Reiss donated $35 million to the Art Gallery of Ontario to increase the museum's exhibition area. Reiss is also on the board of directors for Sinai Health.

== Personal life ==
In 2006 or 2007, Reiss married Erica. They have two children, and live in Toronto, Canada. Erica worked for her family's manufacturing business before they started a family.
