= Tanya Taylor =

Canadian fashion designer based in New York City, U.S.

- Born: Toronto, Ontario
- Occupation: Fashion Designer
- Website: https://www.tanyataylor.com

Tanya Taylor (born in Toronto, Ontario) is a Canadian fashion designer. Based in New York City, she is known for her colourful hand-painted prints and size-inclusive designs.

After graduating from McGill University with a degree in finance, Taylor enrolled in a summer fashion course at Central Saint Martins and continued into the AAS Fashion Studies program at The Parsons New School of Design. In 2012, she launched her namesake label, which is now sold at retailers such as Saks Fifth Avenue, Bergdorf Goodman, Neiman Marcus and Shopbop.

In 2014, Taylor was a top-ten finalist in the CFDA/Vogue Fashion Fund, was a member of the 2015–2016 Swarovski Collective and won the Gold Coast Award. Taylor was also nominated for the Fashion Group International's Rising Star Award and was named to the Forbes 30 Under 30 List in the same year. In 2015, Tanya became an official member of the CFDA, and was awarded the USA Woolmark Regional Prize in recognition of innovation in knitwear, advancing to the International Woolmark Prize finals.

A founding member of Fashion Our Future 2020, Taylor debuted a series of videos titled "Things That Take Longer Than Registering to Vote", rather than presenting a new collection during Fashion Week. The videos featured women such as Rosario Dawson, Mindy Kaling, Hillary Clinton, and Zosia Mamet, among others, doing everyday tasks in two minutes or less, which is equal to the time it takes to register to vote in the United States.

Taylor's collections have been worn by women such as Former First Lady Michelle Obama, Tracee Ellis Ross, Beyoncé, Chrissy Metz, and Aidy Bryant. Today, the Tanya Taylor brand offers sizes 0–22 each season.
