= Nina Kovacheva =

French Bulgarian artist (born 196

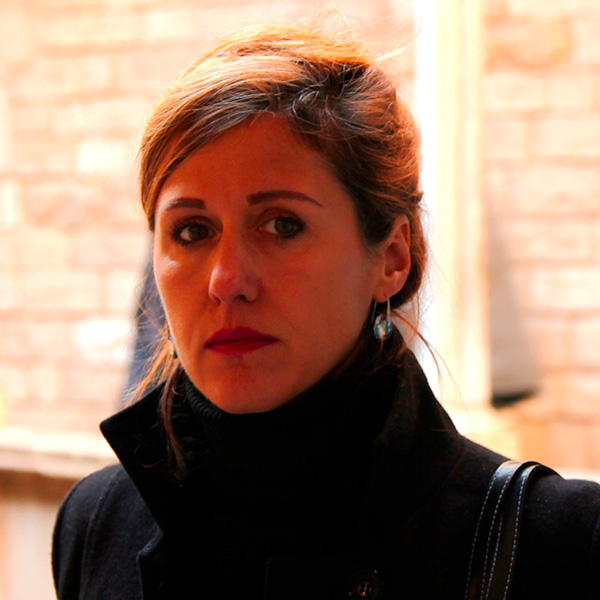
- Nina Kovacheva
- Born: 1960 (age 65–66); Sofia, Bulgaria
- Education: National Academy of Fine Arts, Sofia
- Known for: Drawing, painting, photography, video art, video installation
- Awards: The annual UNESCO Prize for the Arts 2002
- Website: www.ninavale.com

Nina Kovacheva (born 1960) is a French-Bulgarian artist. She lives and works in France.

== Biography ==
Kovacheva was born in Sofia, Bulgaria. She studied at the National Academy of Fine Arts Sofia, graduated in 1985. Her works cover the fields of photography, drawing, painting, objects, video and video installations. Her artistic career also includes a fruitful cooperation with Valentin Stefanoff, her spouse, especially with video and video installations in public and museum spaces. Their collaborative works are signed as ninavale. For the installation 'In the Out', shown at the 4th Biennial of Contemporary Art 2002 in Cetinje, Montenegro, Kovacheva and Stefanoff were awarded the UNESCO annual prize for art.

== Selected solo exhibitions ==
- 2020 'Paradise is temporarily closed, God', Kultum, Graz, Austria (ninavale)
- 2019 H2O / 2H2O, 359 Gallery, Sofia, Bulgaria (ninavale)
- 2018 The temptations of ninavale, Sofia - Arsenal, Museum of Contemporary Art, Sofia, Bulgaria, (ninavale)
- 2018 0 for Black 1 for White, Sofia City Art Gallery, Sofia, Bulgaria (ninavale)
- 2017 The temptations of ninavale, National Gallery of Macedonia, Skopje, Macedonia (ninavale)
- 2015 The Marriage of Heaven and Hell, MAMC, Musee d'Art Modern et Contemporain, Saint Étienne, France
- 2016 Gold and Niles, galerie Heike Curtze, Vienna, Austria
- 2012 The Crying Game, Galerie Heike Curtze, Vienna, Austria
- 2012 Physics and Metaphysics of the Dark Spot, Arosita Gallery, Sofia, Bulgaria, (ninavale)
- 2010 Surplus Enjoyment, Museum of Contemporary Art Taipei, Taiwan (ninavale)
- 2008 Au-delà de ce qui est visible, MNAC National Museum of Contemporary Art, Bucharest, Romania (ninavale)
- 2006 Play for Two Hands and Black, video installation on the facade of Academy of Fine Arts, Sofia, Bulgaria (ninavale)
- 2005 Phases of Accumulation and Extraction in a Limited Space, National Art Gallery, Sofia, Bulgaria, (ninavale)

== Selected group exhibitions ==
- 2019: Disturbing Narratives, ParkView Museum, Singapore
- 2019: Family Matters, Dom Museum, Vienna, Austria
- 2019: Chants d’amour, Galerie DiX9, Paris, France
- 2018: Intriguing Uncertainties, Parkview Museum, Singapore
- 2017: Aging Pride, Belvedere Museum, Vienna, Austria
- 2017: Distinction, Guo Zhong Art Museum, Beijing, China
- 2017: Forms of Coexistence, Structura Gallery, Sofia, Bulgaria,
- 2016: Intrigantes Incertitudes, MAMC Musée d'Art Moderne et Contemporain de St.Étienne, France
- 2016: The Repetition of the Good, The Repetition of the Bad, Neue Synagoge Berlin, Germany
- 2015: Art for Change 1985-2015, City Art Gallery, Sofia Bulgaria
- 2015: Reliqte, Reloaded, Kulturzentrum bei den Minoriten, Graz, Austria
- 2013: Der Mann – Nackt, Kulturstiftung Schloss Britz, Berlin, Germany
- 2012: The Naked Man, Lentos Kunstmuseum, Linz, Austria
- 2011: Drawing in the Age of Fragility, Cabinet de Dessin, Solares – Fondazione delle Arti, Parma, Italy
- 2010: Close Encounter, Jeju Museum of Art, South Korea
- 2010: Central Europe Re-visited Nr.3, Esterhazy Foundation, Austria,
- 2008: Micro-narratives, Musée d’Art Modern et Contemporin St. Etienne, France
- 2008: European Attitude, Zendai MoMA Shanghai, China
- 2007: Portraits, Wet Contact, Face, ZONE: Chelsea Center for the Arts, New York, NY, USA
- 2007: 48th Micro-narratives, October Salon, Belgrade, Serbia
- 2007: ASIA – EUROPE Mediations, National Museum, Poznan, Poland
- 2005: Two Asias, Two Europes, Shanghai Duolun Museum of Modern Art, China
- 2004: Cosmopolis, Macedonian Museum of Contemporary Art, Thessaloniki, Greece
- 2004: Nuit Blanche, Paris, France
- 2002: Die Beherrschung der Natur, Kunsthalle, Hannover, Germany

== Collections ==
NINA Kovacheva's works are included in the following permanent collections: Bibliothèque Nationale de France, Musée d'art moderne (Saint-Étienne) France, Victoria and Albert Museum, London, Albertina collection, Vienna, Esterhazy Foundation Austria, Dom Museum Vienna, Kulturzentrum bei den Minoriten Collection Graz Austria, European Investment Bank Luxembourg, National Art Gallery, Bulgaria, The City Art Gallery Sofia.

== Bibliography ==
- Martine Dancer-Mourès, FAGE editions, 2015. NINA Kovacheva The Marriage of Heaven and Hell ISBN 9782849753996, 2849753998.
- Surplus Enjoyment, 2015. ISBN 9789549241655.
- The Crying Game, 2012
- Aging Pride ISBN 9783903114463, ISBN 9783903228238
- LENTOS Kunstmuseum Linz, Ludwig Museum - Museum of Contemporary Art Budapest The Naked Man, 2012 ISBN 9783869843575.
- Intrigantes Incertitudes ISBN 9782849754085
- Micro-narratives ISBN 9788861308244
- Family Matters ISBN 9783200065123
- Gott hat kein no museums has got religion in Art in Early 21st Century ISBN 9783506782410
- Arte in centro Europa, page 132, Biblioteca d'arte contemporanea Silvana Editoriale
- Art China, Vol 2 page 63 ISBN 9787806725313
