= Beaufille =

Canadian fashion label

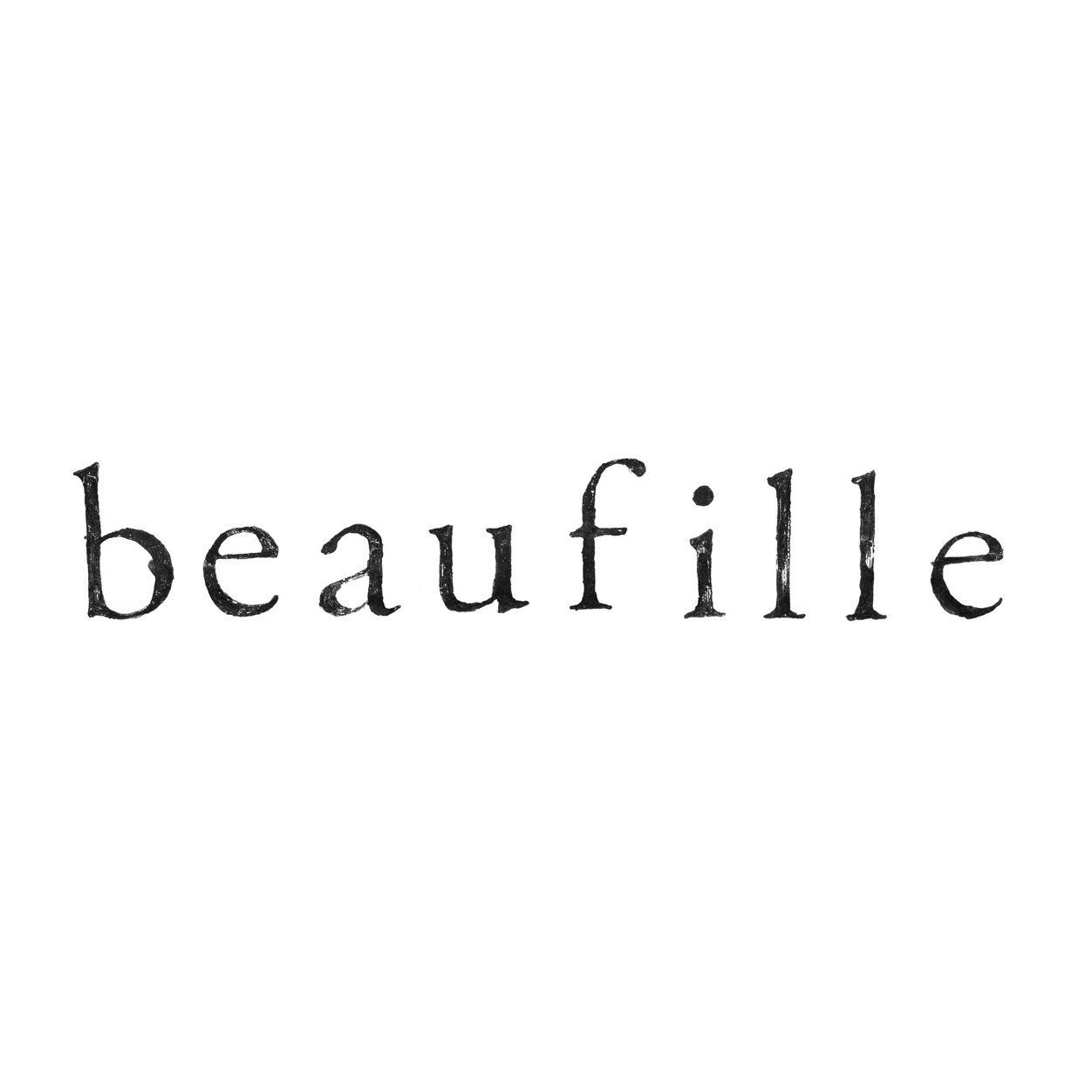
- Industry: Fashion
- Founded: 2009
- Founders: Chloé and Parris Gordon
- Headquarters: Toronto, Ontario, Canada
- Area served: Worldwide
- Products: Clothing, jewelry
- Website: beaufille.com

Beaufille (/boʊˈfiː/ boh-FEE, French: [bofij]) is a Canadian fashion label specializing in fashion, jewelry and accessories for women. The name of the brand is from ungrammatical French beau fille, meaning "handsome girl", symbolizing the marriage of masculine and feminine.

== History ==
The company was originally founded as Chloé comme Parris in 2009 by sisters Chloé Gordon and Parris Gordon. In April 2013, the company name was changed to Beaufille. Both sisters studied at the Nova Scotia College of Art and Design. Chloé graduated in 2010 with a Bachelor of Fine Arts degree majoring in Textiles and now designs the ready-to-wear clothing. Parris graduated with a Bachelor of Fine Arts degree majoring in jewelry and now creates the accessories and jewelry for the brand.

== Reception ==
Beaufille has been featured in Forbes, Vogue, Style.com, Nylon, FASHION, Women's Wear Daily and Glamour.

In 2017, Forbes wrote, "Beaufille's designs have clean lines and bold shapes."

In 2020, Vogue said, "In the Beaufille lexicon, sustainability equates to timeless, interesting pieces you can wear over and over..."

== Notable clients ==
Beaufille has dressed celebrities such as Solange, Lady Gaga, Michelle Obama, Julia Garner, Elle Macpherson, Selena Gomez, Chloë Grace Moretz and the Haim sisters.

== Awards and honours ==
In January 2015, Beaufille received the Emerging Accessories Award at the Canadian Arts and Fashion Awards.

In 2017, Beaufille received the Womenswear designer of the Year award at Canadian Arts and Fashion Awards.

Also in 2017, Beaufille was included on the Forbes 30 Under 30 list, which said, "Chloé and Parris Gordon, co-founders of Canadian fashion label Beaufille, are exemplars of the 'effortless chic' aesthetic that's perpetually in vogue but so difficult to master."

== Point of sale ==
Beaufille is available at retailers worldwide, including Moda Operandi, Dover Street Market, Hudson's Bay Company, Nordstrom, Printemps, and Shopbop.
