= Sara Camposarcone =

Canadian fashion designer and influencer

Sara Camposarcone (born February 12, 1996), also known as Sara Campz, is a Canadian stylist, designer, and social media influencer known for her embrace of outlandish, maximalist fashion.

== Early life and education ==
Camposarcone was born and grew up in Ancaster, Hamilton, Ontario. She attended a Catholic high school and told Maclean's that she was "routinely sent to the principal’s office for breaking the dress code with colourful accessories or mismatched socks." She graduated from Sheridan College in 2018 with a degree in visual merchandising arts. She has a younger sister, Hanna, whom she sometimes features in her videos.

== Fashion ==
Camposarcone describes her style as "playful, colourful, bold and nostalgic" as well as "chaotic", "unhinged" and "joyful". Her outfits incorporate a wide range of eclectic pieces, such as earrings in the shape of lettuce leaves or Teletubby boots. Architectural Digest noted that "[a]n average outfit post from Sara might show her wearing a pink petticoat over bloomers, a cassette tape necklace, a strawberry purse, and a camo hat as the cherry on top." She also makes some of her own accessories.

Camposarcone identifies herself as a "sustainable maximalist", and has stated that the vast majority of her wardrobe is purchased second hand. She has cited designers such as Marc Jacobs, Betsey Johnson, John Galliano, Dame Vivienne Westwood and Iris Apfel as creative influences.

== Career ==
Prior to the COVID-19 pandemic, Camposarcone worked in sales at a technology company. She began to embrace an "exagerrated aesthetic" during the pandemic while working from home. She created a TikTok account in June 2020, where she began sharing her outfits. She later began a job in marketing at Cakeworthy, a clothing company.

Camposarcone told Vogue Business in 2023 that her main source of income was her full-time content creation work.
