= George Sully =

Canadian fashion designer

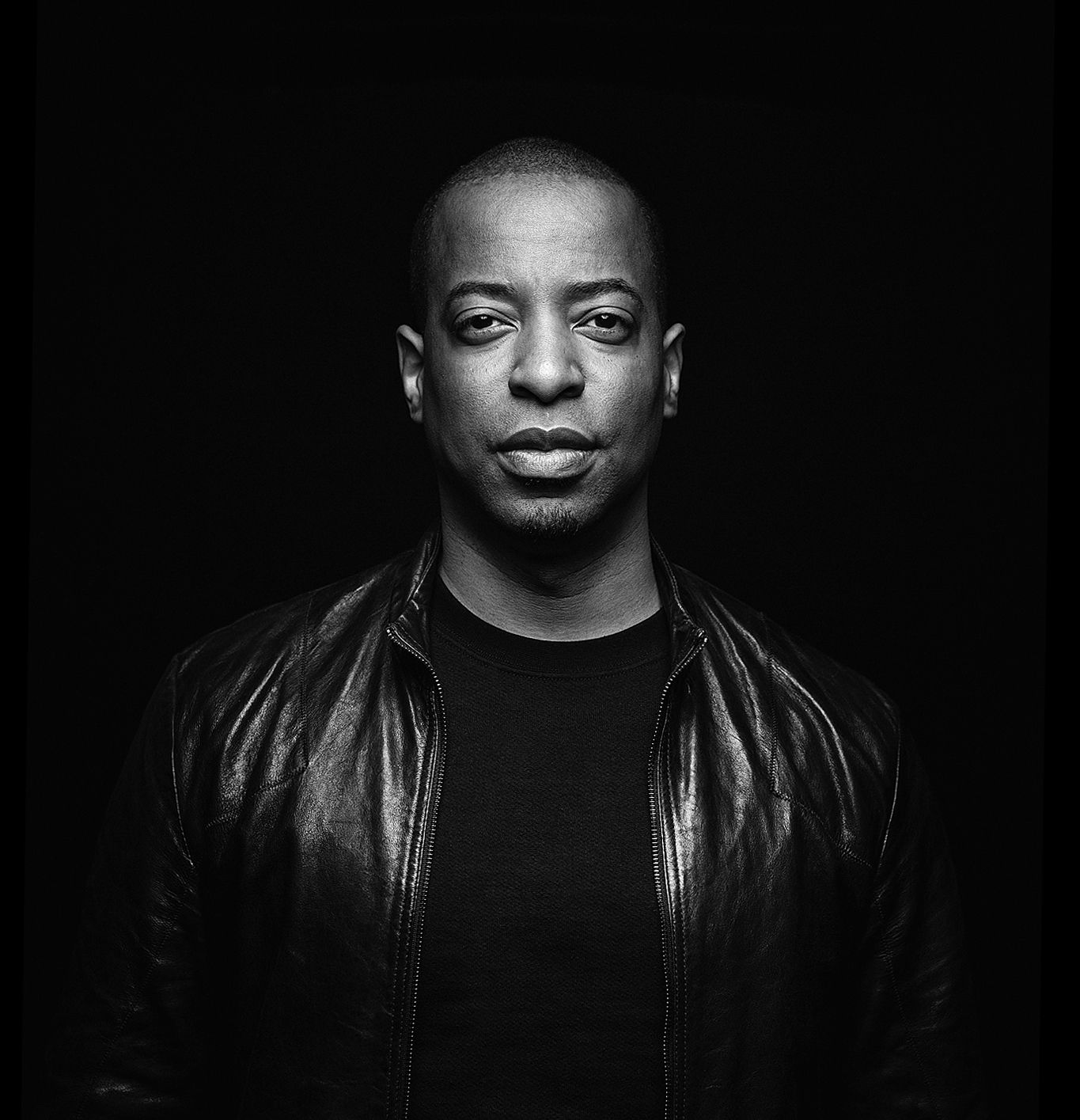
- Sully in 2020
- Born: Ottawa, Ontario, Canada
- Occupations: Fashion designer; Creative director; Entrepreneur; Activist
- Years active: 2004–present
- Organization: Black Designers of Canada
- Labels: House of Hayla; Shoeonado; Sully & Son Company; Sully Wong; Limb Apparel
- Website: www.georgesully.com

George Sully is a Canadian fashion designer. He is the creator of the Black Designers of Canada database, co-founder of fashion brands Sully Wong, House of Hayla, and founder of Sully & Son Company.

== Early life ==
Sully was born in Ottawa, Ontario, and attended Notre Dame High School.

== Career ==
Sully started his career as an artist and music producer. Later transitioned from music to fashion. He created Limb Apparel which featured streetwear and moved to Toronto in his 20s to pursue a fashion career.

Sully launched Sully Wong, with Henry Wong. The two founders divided the labour with Sully focused on the graphics and marketing of the products. In 2013, Sully Wong premiered a line of desert boot runners with designer Karim Rashid at the Magic Trade Show in Las Vegas. Sully stated that this collaboration exposed their designs to a celebrities and an international audience. One of these designs was inducted into the Bata Shoe Museum's permanent collection. Sully Wong partnered with student mentees at Central Toronto Academy in 2016 to create The Wolf Sneaker as part of the "6ixess" clothing line. The Winter Kicks shoe, another piece in the collection that Sully co-designed with students, was inducted into the Bata Shoe Museum in 2019.

In 2018, Sully launched House of Hayla with Hayla Amini featuring monochromatic stiletto shoes inspired by Pantone Colour Institute hues. The heels are vegan and approved by PETA. He is also the maker of the Starfleet uniform boot in Star Trek: Discovery.

In 2020, Sully launched Sully & Son Company a premium travel and accessories brand. His first collaboration was with LG Electronics Canada to create a custom backpack in celebration of their VELVET LG smart phone launch. In 2020, Sully was awarded the Fashion International Group Visionary Award.

In 2021, TD Bank launched its annual TD Thanks campaign, recognizing and rewarding George Sully with personalized thank you gifts in support of his community initiative efforts in creating Black Designers of Canada. Later in the year, George Sully starred in CRAVE Network Documentary style feature called Creative Soles, where he and his colleagues were given the task to create a custom sneaker for television host Tyrone Edwards.

In 2022 George was awarded with honorary degree credentials by George Brown College, an Honorary Bachelor degree in Brand Design.

In 2022, George sully was added to the elevate festival, the country's largest Canadian -led and founded technology and arts festival as a speaker alongside, Venus Williams, Andre DeGrasse and Micheal Romannow. In the same year, George Sully was honoured by the Canadian Art & Fashion Awards (CAFA) with the inaugural Changemaker Award created to honor those who have spearheaded progressive change within the fashion industry.

== Black Designers of Canada ==
In 2020, Sully launched the online platform Black Designers of Canada to promote diversity in the fashion industry and promote black artists in Canada. The website collected content via self and peer nominations on social media and through its website. In 2021, he launched The Black Designers of Canada Award of Excellence to recognize Black designers and their achievements.
