= Christopher Bates (fashion designer) =

Canadian menswear designer

Christopher Bates is a Canadian menswear designer based in Toronto, Ontario Canada.

== Biography ==
Born and raised in Vancouver, British Columbia, Bates completed a Bachelor of Arts program at the University of British Columbia and went on to complete a Management Certificate in Marketing Communications at British Columbia Institute of Technology. After working in the Vancouver marketing industry for five years he moved to Milan to study Fashion Design at Istituto Marangoni. After graduating he founded the Christopher Bates brand in Canada in 2008, and relocated to Milan where he designed and oversaw management operations. Bates now lives and repatriated to Toronto, where he has a private studio in Toronto's Eaton Centre.

== Brand ==
The personality and aesthetic of the Christopher Bates brand has been recognized for its contemporary European tailoring and bespoke details. A recurring signature style in his collections is the 'Romeo' dress shirt which features a kiss print on the collar. The brand has seen partnerships with Holt Renfrew, Gotstyle, Gilt, and collaborative projects with Browns and Harry Rosen and Air Canada.

== Notable clients ==
His clothing has been worn by Greg Bryk, Kristopher Higgins, Ramin Karimloo, John Boyega, Jordan Weller, Charlie Carrick, Tygh Runyan, Alex Di Giorgio, Craig Olejnik, Gennaro Laccarino, Ron MacLean, Jose Bautista, Michael Shannon, George Russell, Don Cheadle, John Boyega, Wilson Cruz, Charles Leclerc, DeMarre Carroll and Shawn Mendes.

== Awards ==
- 2012 Mercedes-Benz StartUp Program Feature Designer
- 2014 Included as one of Canada's Top 100 Most Influential People
- 2014 Notable Award for Fashion in Canada
- 2015 CAFA Menswear Designer of the Year Award Nomination
- 2018 Visionary Award from Fashion Group International, FGI
- 2019 Canadian Menswear Designer of the Year Award, CAFA
