= Greta Constantine =

Canadian line of women's wear

- Founded: 2006 (Toronto, Ontario, Canada)
- Headquarters: Toronto, Ontario, Canada industry = Ready-to-wear
- Products: Clothing and accessories
- Website: http://www.gretaconstantine.com

Greta Constantine is a line of women's wear designed by Kirk Pickersgill and Stephen Wong in Toronto, Ontario, Canada. The label is a pairing of the names of Wong's mother, Greta, and Pickersgill's grandfather, Constantine. The two have been dubbed "jersey boys of Toronto" for the jersey they use for their collections. The first collection, was carried by the Canadian department store Holt Renfrew.

Designer Stephen Wong is known for his appearance on Season 1 of Project Runway Canada, in which he placed fourth.

== Collections ==
- Greta Constantine: women's line
- Ezra Constantine: men's line
- Greta Constantine Primer: a lower-priced line
- Greta Constantine SKIN: a capsule collection of draped leather pieces designed for retailer Danier

== Reception ==
Canadian fashion ranking aggregate website Canadian-Fashion.ca rated the Greta Constantine collection 2.5/5 stars and the Ezra Constantine 3.5/5 stars. Greta Constantine was also nominated for Womenswear Designer of the Year at the first annual 2014 CAFA Awards. They have almost instantaneously acquired a clientele including both celebrities and socialites since the beginning of their label in 2006, such as Coco Rocha, Angelina Jolie, Naomi Campbell and Jeanne Beker, to name a few. With fashion shows during Toronto and New York Fashion Week and partnerships with brands such as 5 Gum, Aldo, MAC Cosmetics, Audi, and Kiehl's, they have made an impression of high caliber in the worldwide fashion industry. They have appeared in major magazines including Vogue, British Vogue, Nylon, FASHION, In Style, Elle Canada, The Globe and Mail, FQ, WWD, Glow, National Post, the Toronto Star, Flare, Us Weekly, Hello! Magazine, and House and Home, where they have received much praise and recognition. Critiques: "Greta Constantine is known for doing drape exactly the way we imagine it to be: tight in all the right places, gathering evenly around curves, while always giving the airy impression of one solid piece of fabric just thrown over the body." - Whatever Eurotrash, blogger "Their most desirable and sophisticatedly beautiful offering to date, it was well worth the wait. And when Coco Rocha personally contacts you to say she would like to walk the show, as the Canadian supermodel did, you know you are doing something right." - FLARE magazine on Spring 2011 show

In November 2021, Greta Constantine released her 2022 Spring "Back to Work" collection celebrating the end of the pandemic and the return to office.
