= NKPR Inc =

Public relations, artist management, and digital media agency

- Industry: Public Relations
- Founded: 2002
- Founder: Natasha Koifman
- Headquarters: Toronto; New York
- Website: nkpr.net

NKPR is a Toronto, Canada-based public relations, artist management, and digital media agency with locations in Toronto and New York. NKPR was Founded in 2002 by Natasha Koifman.

== History ==
Natasha Koifman started NKPR in 2002 as a public relations agency, creating strategic campaigns, events and strategic partnerships for clients. In 2009, NKPR expanded its services to include a social media department. In June 2017, NKPR celebrated 15 years in business with a crystal anniversary event. Today, NKPR represents over 30 national and international brands.

In 2014, NKPR launched its NK Artists division, which "connects celebrities, influencers and artists with brands through strategic partnerships". Some of the NK Artists clients include: interviewer George Stroumboulopoulos; reportage-style fashion photographer Sophie Elgort; reality TV star, fashion designer, model and philanthropist Sophie Tweed Simmons; journalist and author Shinan Govani; co-founder of The Coveteur, fashion designer Erin Kleinberg; and actor Yannick Bisson.

NKPR supports philanthropic organizations. Natasha is president of the board of directors for Artists for Peace and Justice (APJ) Canada and is on the board of directors for APJ USA. The company has also developed long-term relationships with Best Buddies and Dare to Wear Love. In 2016 NKPR launched an agency-wide corporate responsibility program called the 26 Acts of Kindness which fosters a culture of kindness and empowers team members to find and support a cause to encourage others to do the same.

== The IT Lounge ==
In 2006, NKPR established the IT Lounge, which provided an opportunity for brands to "connect with celebrities for a cause" during film festival season in Toronto. In 2009 NKPR's IT Lounge became the first event of its kind in North America where every brand donated to a cause.

NKPR's IT Lounge evolved in 2012 to include a celebrity portrait studio, which has become a regular component of the annual week-long event. The first IT Lounge Portrait Studio featured the fashion photographer Patrick Demarchelier (Condé Nast), The Coveteur's Norman Wong and W magazine's Caitlin Cronenberg, daughter of award-winning filmmaker David Cronenberg.

In celebration of the 10th anniversary of the IT Lounge in 2015, NKPR brought the event to festival headquarters at the TIFF Bell Lightbox in an official partnership with the Toronto International Film Festival.

In September 2016, in collaboration with The Scott Brothers (hosts of shows such as Property Brothers) NKPR produced the IT House x Producers Ball. The 5-day pop-up was a hub for film and television industry players. IT House x Producers Ball hosted the W magazine portrait studio with Caitlin Cronenberg with live street art performances by artist Peter Tunney.

The IT House x Producers Ball has bome an annual event during the Toronto Film Festival. It features daily programming including industry panels and sponsored activations and celebrity portrait studio. Past media partners of IT House x Producers Ball include Coveteur, NYLON and Rolling Stone.

== ShopNK ==
In September 2019, NKPR launched an e-commerce site that gives consumers the chance to give back to a partner charity with each purchase.

== Awards and recognition ==
NKPR won the Best Full-Service PR Firm 2023 - GTA award given out by the Canadian Business Awards.

== Business ==
In 2012, NKPR was ranked number 78 in the PROFIT/Chatelaine W100 ranking and award program, which celebrates the largest firms owned and operated by women. Natasha was also selected as one of BIZBASH's 66 Most Innovative Event Pros in 2012. In 2013 Natasha was named Canada's most influential public relations professional on Twitter and NKPR placed number 34 amongst Canada's fastest-growing marketing services & media companies in the 2013 Profit 500 industry rankings. In 2015, Natasha Koifman was awarded the WXN Canada's Most Powerful Women: Top 100 Award in the CIBC Entrepreneurs category. In 2017, Natasha Koifman was recognized again by WXN Canada's Most Powerful Women: Top 100 Award this time in the CIBC Trailblazers & Trendsetters category.

Natasha Koifman wrote several pieces for the Huffington Post in 2016-17. As one of the first tastemakers to be featured on the fashion platform The Coveteur, she has been profiled in leading publications including Marie Claire, FASHION, the Globe and Mail, National Post, Canadian Living and Chatelaine.

In July 2021, Natasha Koifman became the first North American publicist to license her name to a condominium. Natasha The Residences is a 47-storey high-rise located at 263 Adelaide St. W. in Toronto's cultural district steps from where Natasha opened the first NKPR office in 2002. Presented by luxury builder, Lanterra Developments and designed in collaboration with Studio Munge, the building's fashion-forward design looks, feels and behaves like Natasha's private Toronto residence and is targeted to sophisticated urbanites looking for an integrated space in which they could live, work and play.
