= Mavor =

Mavor may refer to:

- Mavor Island, Qikiqtaaluk Region, Nunavut, Canada

== People ==
- James Mavor (1854–1925), Scottish-Canadian economist
- James Watt Mavor (1883–1963), American biologist
- Wilfrid "Smoot" Mavor (1892–1984), Canadian Brigadier-General
- Mavor Moore (1919–2006), Canadian writer, producer, and actor
- Dora Mavor Moore (1888–1979), Canadian actress and theater director

=== People with the surname ===
- Carol Mavor, American writer and professor
- Elinor Mavor, American science fiction editor
- Elizabeth Mavor (1927–2013), British writer
- Freya Mavor (born 1993), Scottish actress and model
- Leslie Mavor (1916–1991), Scottish Royal Air Force officer
- Mike Mavor, New Zealand rugby union player
- William Fordyce Mavor (1758–1837), Scottish teacher, priest and writer

== See also ==
- Mavora Lakes, South Island of New Zealand
