= Adrienne Wu =

Canadian fashion designer (b. 1990)

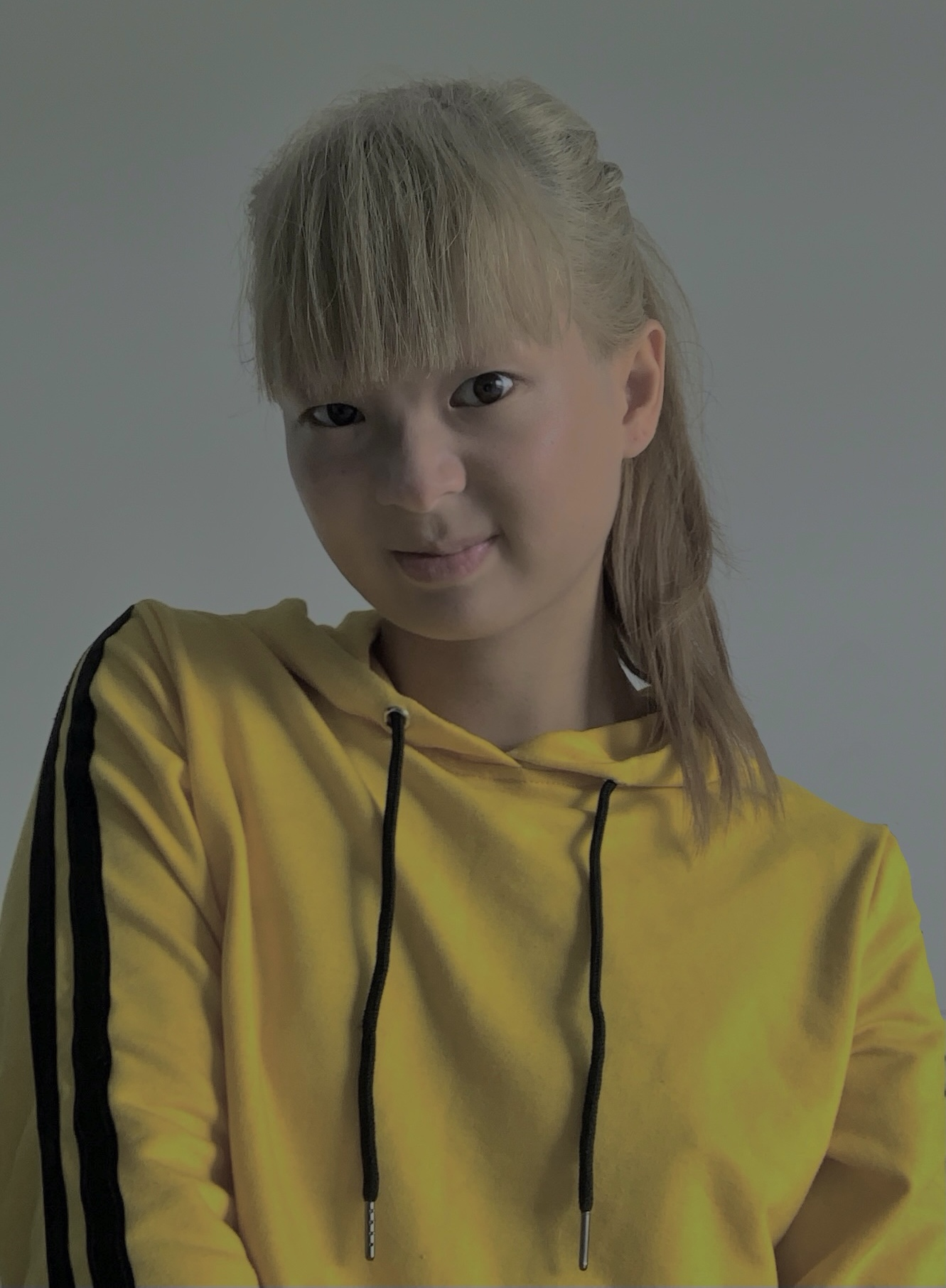
- Adrienne Wu in 2020
- Born: 9 August 1990 (age 36); Burlington, Ontario, Canada
- Occupation: Fashion designer

Adrienne Wu (born August 9, 1990) is a Canadian fashion designer.

== About ==
Adrienne Francis Wu Ming Bong is a Canadian fashion designer who was born on August 9, 1990, in Burlington, Ontario. On their YouTube channel in 2015, Wu came out as Neutrois (Non-Binary) Transgender, began using gender-neutral pronouns, and began advocating with Toronto's (SOY) Supporting Our Youth group. Wu began their self-taught career in 2008, when they posted 50 outfits on social media, which led to possibilities to produce fashion shows and collections across Canada. Margaret Atwood, a display at the National Gallery, and Freed Development's Fashion House Condos were among the business collaborations featured during Vancouver, Ottawa, and Toronto Fashion Week. Wu has concentrated on design through fleecer.ca, a wearable technology firm, @wumingbong on YouTube, a transgender and non-binary advocacy platform, and a Huffington Post column researching queer theory, trans studies, and transhumanism since transitioning. A collaboration with art critic and scholar Matthew Grimm @grimmxwu on Instagram, which investigates the intersections between Meta-Modernism and Post-Humanism, is now in the works.

== Early life ==
Wu credits most of their inspiration to their mother Jean Carole Wu. Their maternal grandmother Joan Davis was the head designer of Tai Ping Carpets Hong Kong in the 1960s. Wu attended Hillfield Strathallan College and, in late 2009, they attended the University of Toronto aiming to go into a career of sex therapy. They dropped out after one year.

After creating their portfolio, they were accepted by the Istituto Marangoni, but deferred the offer to start their own company in September 2010. In 2011, they opened their first boutique in downtown Toronto.

== Career ==
Wu learned to sew in 2009 after they dropped out of the University of Toronto. Their first break was being offered a position at MuchMusic in April 2010 as a Fashion Correspondent, where they worked for half a year. The same day that Wu was offered the position, they received an invitation to show their Fall Winter 2010 Collection at Vancouver Fashion Week. Wu was nineteen years old. They showed their very first time at Vancouver Fashion Week, which kick started their career as a fashion designer. Wu participated in the Spring-Summer 2011 Collection at the National Gallery of Canada during the Ottawa Fashion Week in October 2010. In the same month, they met Shawn Hewson of Project Runway Canada through the Alumni Association of Hillfield Strathallan College. Hewson mentored Wu for a year and introduced them to the Fashion Design Council of Canada. In 2009 artist Mehrnaz had illustrated a painting of one of Wu's earlier pieces.

In November 2010, Wu was offered their first corporate collaboration, with The Allan Candy Co., based in Hamilton, Ontario. Wu was commissioned to create dresses out of Allan Candy wrappers for an online advertisement. This was the first time Allan Candy had collaborated with a fashion designer and used the advertisement to launch its DOPS candy line.

Quickly known as the 18-year-old-boy who modelled their own dresses, Prestel published Wu internationally in a book called Style Diaries: World Fashion from Berlin to Tokyo in February 2011. The author, Simone Werle, featured Wu as "one of the most influential forces behind tomorrow's trends".

In March 2011, R&B singer Keisha Chanté modelled Wu's dress in the Dare to Wear Love Fashion Show. After the show, Wu's work was featured at Textile Museum of Canada as a part of Canada's first Fashion Exhibition, called Dare to Wear Love, in support of the Stephen Lewis Foundation.

At twenty-one, Wu debuted their Spring-Summer 2012 Collection, titled "Creatures of the Photons", at Toronto Fashion Week; the collection featured dresses resembling "large testicles and penis shapes jutting". Wu has been critiqued as having "remarkable silhouettes", as quoted by the Ottawa Citizen. Huffington Post said Wu had "dramatic and breathtaking designs." Wu was also called "a fashion wunderkind" by both the Ottawa Citizen and Toronto Star.

Wu had the opportunity to collaborate with Margaret Atwood at the Book Lovers Ball, hosted in support of the Toronto Public Library in January 2012. Wu created designs inspired by Atwood's 2011 book In Other Worlds: SF and the Human Imagination. Margaret tweeted that Wu is "a brilliant designer". In March 2012, Wu was also involved with the Heart and Stroke Foundation of Canada in their annual event, The Heart Truth. Jessi Cruikshank, eTalk's host, modeled a Wu creation as event's opening dress. Later that month, Canada's Got Talent host Dina Pugliese modeled Wu's custom designed dress for the 2012 Dare to Wear Love Fashion Show, again serving as a fundraiser for the Steven Lewis Foundation.

Wu has dressed celebrities such as Jessi Cruickshank, Keshia Chanté, Dina Pugliese, Kreesha Turner, and Christine Avanti.

Other publications which have covered Wu include The Globe and Mail, Flare, Fashion and the National Post. Other television news and fashion programs to cover WU include FashionTelevision, CBC's Creative Block and CNTV's Culture Express.

Wu designed a tutu for the National Ballet of Canada's 60th anniversary celebration which is to be debuted late 2012. Wu has also recently been commissioned to their second corporate collaboration recently. Wu was to create a dress out of Canadian company Kruger Inc.'s Cashmere toilet paper. Kruger planned to launch this "White Cashmere Collection" in September 2012. Wu became a spokesperson for Perrier as an official social influencer in 2012.

== Criticism ==
=== Debut ===
After Wu's debut at Toronto Fashion Week in late 2011, Natalie Atkinson of the National Post criticized them for "threads hanging from the seam" and sending "unabashedly hairy-legged boys" down the runway. She concluded the review with "...if Wu is earnest, I would urgently refer Wu to land an internship at Comme des Garçons or Margiela".

Fashion called Wu "overwrought", while Flare felt Wu's work contributed to "[o]ne of the most unforgettable shows we saw this season".

=== Gawker ===
In early 2012, Wu had their "Hierarchy of Needs" FW12 show at Toronto Fashion Week, which involved models wearing Guy Fawkes masks. This caused controversy, with the Toronto Star stating that the "message baffles audience". Wu also caught the attention of Gawker, which questioned Wu's judgment for citing the group Anonymous.

== Personal life ==
In 2015, Wu came out as neutrois, a non-binary gender identity, and started going by they/them pronouns. In the following year, Wu wrote an article on Medium explaining the concept of being non-binary and how it differs greatly from other transgender identities. They have since openly participated in the Trans Fusion drop-ins at the Sherbourne Health Centre in Toronto, advocating for the visibility of non-binary identities within the vast spectrum of gender diversity. During 2016, Wu posted video updates about their transition journey on their personal YouTube channel. By no later than December 2017, Wu changed their first name to Adrienne.

In 2015, Wu began advocating with Toronto's Supporting Our Youth organization.

== Reception ==
In 2011, Fashion reviewed Wu's debut collection saying it "...failed to impress". It added: "While the gowns themselves were quite striking in a palette of muted colours and constructed to Wu's signature voluminous style, it was not the focus of the audience, and apparently not that of its either. On more than a few pieces, faulty zippers and rogue hem threads stuck out like sore sartorial thumbs."

In 2013, Canadian fashion ranking aggregate website Canadian-Fashion.ca rated Wu 2 out of 5 stars for their body of work.
