= Second Wind (1976 film) =

1976 film directed by Donald Shebib

- Film poster
- Directed by: Don Shebib
- Written by: Hal Ackerman
- Produced by: James Margellos; Les Weinstein(executive producer)
- Starring: James Naughton; Lindsay Wagner
- Cinematography: Reginald H. Morris
- Edited by: Don Shebib
- Music by: Hagood Hardy
- Production company: Olympic Films
- Distributed by: Ambassador Film Distributors
- Release date: 9 April 1976
- Running time: 92 minutes 40 seconds
- Country: Canada
- Language: English
- Budget: C$500,000

Second Wind is a 1976 Canadian sport comedy film, directed and edited by Don (Donald) Shebib, written by Hal Ackerman, and produced by James Margellos. This was the first feature film starring role for actor James Naughton, who portrays a stock broker whose new jogging hobby turns into an obsession to excel at long distance running, straining his career and his relationship with his wife (Lindsay Wagner).

The film is Shebib's fourth feature. Commercially unsuccessful, reviews of Second Wind were mixed, tending to praise the cinematography and acting, but usually faulting the script. Second Wind won a Canadian Society of Cinematographers award and two Canadian Screen Awards.

== Plot ==
Roger Mathieson (James Naughton) is a 30-year-old stockbroker for whom everything has come easily. One day, he sees a TV report about a 26-year-old running champion and listens intently to remarks from the athlete's coach. Inspired, Mathieson begins jogging, soon discovering he's not in great shape—yet Mathieson persists, fascinated by the notion of trying something difficult for the first time in his life. He trains obsessively to be a winner. This creates friction with his wife, Linda, who does not understand why her husband prefers spending time alone to spending time with her. His new hobby also creates problems at work, distracted when he should be focused on a major deal, allowing an ambitious coworker to usurp his stature as the firm's golden boy. As if that were not enough, an attractive woman named Paula (Tedde Moore) hits on him one day while he is out jogging, then tries to seduce him, testing his fidelity to his long-suffering wife. It's almost too late for his marriage by the time he learns that he's been risking "the right things in the wrong place."

== Cast ==
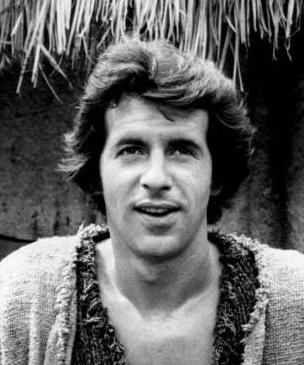
James Naughton in 1974

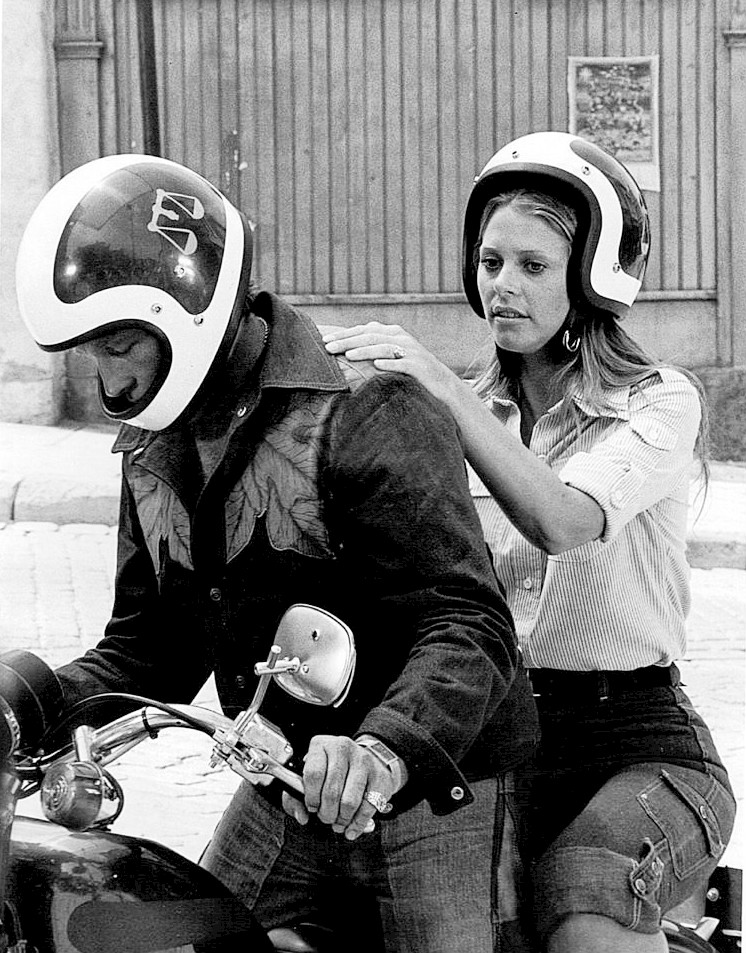
Lindsay Wagner and guest Evel Knievel filming The Bionic Woman in 1977

- James Naughton as Roger Mathieson
- Lindsay Wagner as Linda Mathieson
- Kenneth Pogue as Pete
- Tedde Moore as Paula
- Tom Harvey as Frank
- Louis Del Grande as Howie
- Gerard Parkes as Packard
- Jonathan Welsh as Simon
- Cec Linder as Graham
- Allan Levson as Kevin
- Vivian Reis as Winnie
- Robert Goodier as broker
- Mike Hurley as runner
- Robyn Jaffe as Rodger's secretary
- Robert Slee as broker
- John D. Henderson as runner in park
- Julie Bird as Howie's neighbour
- Les Rubie as old man at cabins
- Ken Camroux as broker

== Themes ==
In a 2013 interview with Sam Weisberg, director Don Shebib described the themes of the film: "I like what it says and what it's about, the guy chasing a dream, getting caught up in obsessions." Maurice Élia speculates that the film was made to coincide with the 1976 Olympics.

== Production ==
=== Writing and casting ===
In the interview with Weisberg, Shebib says that Hal Ackerman's "script was weak in some ways, and I didn't have time to fix it." Michael Walsh remarks that the film was made when Canadian producers found it easier to obtain financing if they cast American actors in starring roles, a regular strategy used by producer James Margellos. This was the first feature film starring role for James Naughton, who had appeared in television roles since 1972, and was best known at the time from the single-season 1974 television series Planet of the Apes. Lindsay Wagner was known for her lead role on the American science fiction television series The Bionic Woman.

=== Financing ===
Marni Jackson suggested that Shebib was aware of the film having shortcomings, "and from Shebib's point of view this has as much to do with the teen-age Canadian film industry as his own limitations." He is quoted as complaining about having to raise funds for projects: "You use up all your energy raising money instead of making films if you're a director in this country ... I’m sick and tired of starting back at zero with every new film." The film was shot on a budget of C$500,000, which Jackson quips "wouldn't buy doughnuts" for the cast of Barry Lyndon.

=== Filming ===
Second Wind was shot on 35mm (aspect ratio: 1.85:1) over a period of six weeks in late 1975. Reginald H. Morris was pleased that there were no sets: "it was all shot in natural surroundings, in people's houses, in the stock exchange, in bars and so on", in Toronto, Gravenhurst, and London, Ontario. Morris preferred shooting reality over filming on a set:

You can imagine having a set, and outside the window you have to burn it out, so it's not readable, or put up some phony backing or something; whereas if you're in a real situation you can have people outside the window, even conversing through the window; you can see traffic going by — things you can't do in film studios.

Another aspect of the project that pleased him was shooting with Canon high speed lenses. It started out as a problem created by Kodak coming out with a new stock ("they never ask us, the people who use it"), which made it impossible to make use of force processing. For Morris to not lose the "extra stop" (f-stop) gained by force processing, he had to look for other means, "and that other means is a fast lens." With it, Morris said that the less light is used, "you find that you don't really have to fill anything because it fills itself."

There was a scene in a kitchen in Second Wind that I shot virtually with existing light. The sun was shining through the kitchen window and it was hitting the floor and bouncing up and filling the whole room. I had seen it and hadn't done much about it because I thought maybe the director doesn't go for that sort of thing, but much to my surprise Don Shebib said "Wow, look at that!" So I did shoot it without any other light. I couldn't have done it without high speed lenses.

Ordinarily, explained Morris, there is a certain difficulty with repeated takes under the shifting effects of the sun, the angles of sunlight and strength making match shots tricky.

=== Music ===
Hagood Hardy's theme for Second Wind appears on his LP Maybe Tomorrow (Attic Records, 1976).

== Release ==
Second Wind had its premiere at Plaza 2 in Toronto on 9 April 1976. Its American premiere took place at the University of Iowa student-run Refocus film, video and photography festival on 17 April 1976, with Shebib in attendance.

=== Distribution ===
American film producer and sales agent Arnold Kopelson was tasked with selling Second Wind internationally during its screening at Cannes. Executive producer Les Weinstein worried that "the film had become just one of many for the sales agent and was not being adequately pushed."

=== Home media ===
A VHS cassette was released in 1993 by VidAmerica, Inc. (also distributed through Ambassador), available through Amazon. The film is also available on DVD.

== Reception ==
=== Commercial performance ===
The film was a commercial failure, Shebib's third following Rip-Off and the critically applauded Between Friends.

=== Critical response ===
==== Contemporary ====
Michael Walsh gave Second Wind an overwhelmingly positive review, calling it a "wonder", "an exciting, stylish picture that can be enjoyed by the whole family" and a "first-class film". Walsh hails the direction, the script, the cinematography and especially the cast, who are "little-known but solidly professional performers who put it across to near perfection", reserving particular praise for Naughton. "Shebib provides him with top direction and solid support in all departments. Cameraman Reginald Morris’s cinematography is slick and sophisticated. Hagood Hardy’s inspired musical score knows just when to shut up and when to come on strong." And writer Hal Ackerman "skillfully steers a course between plot excesses and banality". Six years later, Walsh reaffirmed that Second Wind was "a finely-wrought film" and considered it "the precursor" of films such as Personal Best (1982) and Chariots of Fire (1981).

Natalie Edwards was impressed by the entire cast: "Refreshing to have a film where the climaxes are exciting but not violent, the motivation is not money and the tale adds something to nour understanding of the thrill of a personal struggle."

Clive Denton, while less effusive, nevertheless also praised the film for its music, cinematography and direction, calling the script "well-structured", and "often sharp and witty", though he felt there was some "sketchiness" to the family relationship, saying the script is "below its best level" with the wife and the son seems like a "perky little visitor" rather than their own child. Marni Jackson thought the story was "a good idea" and called the film "dutifully pretty," but called the characters "so diaphanous you can see daylight through them," concluding the project suffered from a low budget, "which says more about the Canadian film-making climate than Shebib." Maurice Élia echoed many of Jackson's impressions: the story itself is quite original and a source of inspiration in some sense, and, for the first time (on the screen or off), Toronto actually looks good (perhaps to the point of exaggeration). The film begins well, but loses its way due to an ineptly written script littered with the kind of dialogue which undermines the credibility of the supporting characters: Paula is a sketch at best and the couple's son barely exists at all; even Lindsay Wagner's character is effectively a secondary character made up of unacceptable rejoinders.

John Reeves said that Second Wind is well filmed and acted, but likewise faulted the script as unbelievable: the film does not accurately show the realities of training for competition, and thereby relegates itself to the realm of melodrama. TV Guide gave the film a rating of 2 stars out of 5, calling it an "innocuous saga," and faulting it for not explaining why the protagonist "refuses to explain the character of his obsession to his wife."

==== Retrospective ====
Peter Hanson describes Second Wind as "amiably predictable", a kind of cinematic "comfort food", made when "small movies about the everyday lives of ordinary people were made regularly, even if those pictures sometimes emerged from the fringes of the industry". The characters are "drawn fairly well" (Hanson notes that Hal Ackerman went on to become a popular screenwriting teacher at UCLA's film school), "and some of the dialogue clicks, especially passages of sarcastic banter."

More importantly, the overall narrative has a pleasing shape, fully exploring Roger's dalliance with athletic endeavor. Therefore, fretting that the picture lacks surprise somewhat misses the point, since the focus is Roger testing his limits. Naughton, never the deepest of players, lends likeability and sincerity, while Wagner mostly runs her fingers through her hair. In one unintentionally amusing bit, her character tries jogging but quickly gives up—quite a change from familiar images of Wagner running endlessly as The Bionic Woman.

=== Accolades ===
- 27th Canadian Film Awards (1976) • Best Editing (Don Shebib) • Best Supporting Actress (Tedde Moore)
- Canadian Society of Cinematographers Feature Award (Reginald H. Morris, 1976)
