= Zamprogna =

Zamprogna is a surname. It is a northern Italian last name , although not common. Fewer than sixty families have this surname in Italy.

Notable people with the surname include:

- Dominic Zamprogna (born 1979), Canadian actor
- Gema Zamprogna (born 1976), Canadian actress
