= The Cube (film) =

1969 film by Jim Henson

- Written by: Jim Henson; Jerry Juhl
- Directed by: Jim Henson
- Starring: Richard Schaal
- Country of origin: United States
- Original language: English

Production
- Producer: Jim Henson
- Running time: 54 minutes

Original release
- Network: NBC
- Release: February 23, 1969

The Cube is a surreal comedy-horror film that first aired on the weekly anthology series NBC Experiment in Television in 1969. The film was produced and directed by puppeteer and filmmaker Jim Henson. Henson had produced the documentary "Youth '68" for the previous season of NBC Experiment in Television.

The Cube was one of Henson's experiments with the live-action genre he conducted before focusing primarily on the Muppets and other puppet works. Screenplay coauthor Jerry Juhl subsequently served as the Muppets head writer for nearly four decades.

== Plot ==
An unnamed Man is trapped in a white, cubic room. A maintenance man, Arnie, brings him a stool. After Arnie leaves, the Man tries to find an exit. He encounters various people coming through hidden doors, each claiming he can escape through theirs. The first, Margaret, calls him "Ted" and tells him to come with her, but closes the door before he can escape.

Next is Mr. Thomas, the establishment manager, who tells him to find his own door before leaving. Arnie returns, giving the Man a telephone. Testing it outside, a brief opening vanishes when it rings. Arnie says the phone works, but the Man finds it only calls Arnie. He throws it at the wall; Arnie opens a panel and it flies through.

Two police officers, a sergeant and Officer Fritz, enter. They find smuggled gold and an arsenal of weapons hidden in the panels. The sergeant handcuffs the Man and leave with the contraband, telling him to wait.

A decorator, Miss Bix, refuses to say how long he will be there, has shellac sprayed onto the white walls, and leaves. A guitarist enters and gives the Man keys to free himself from the handcuffs. A bed manifests, and the Man rests while the guitarist practices. The rest of his band joins, singing a song about how the man will never get out of the cube. After they leave, Thomas announces that the "Rest Period" is over.

An escaped prisoner, Watson, noting his Cube had squares while this has rectangles. He returns to check for left items. Thomas asks if anyone visited. The Man confirms it. Thomas calls the visitor an actor, introducing Jack Van Evera. Leaving, Jack asks what the Cubes are for. Thomas replies, "He was only kidding."

A seductress, Cora, enters as a couch and liquor cabinet appear. They kiss on the couch until physicians Dr. Bradowski and Dr. Bingham enter with their nurse to run medical tests on the Man. Cora leaves. The doctors give the Man his results, then leave to tend to a platypus.

A professor enters, calling his presence a teleplay or hallucination, showing an ending with the Man and a girl before leaving. A black militant enters, wanting the Man to exit his door. The Man refuses since it belongs to the militant. The militant leaves, saying, "You make me sick." A classy party manifests. Thomas offers tonic. The Man tries to participate but is blocked by an invisible barrier. Guest Mrs. Stratton calls Thomas a projection, stating the party is unreal. The illusion vanishes, leaving the Man on his stool.

A scientist enters to define reality. When the Man claims the scientist's hammer is non-existent, the scientist throws it, denting the wall. Arnie reprimands him, fixes the wall, and leaves. The scientist exits, wishing the Man rots. A young woman, Liza, enters and gives two hints: "it's going to get worse before it gets better" and "don't trust anybody." She rapidly ages and leaves. Thomas enters, stating time is up and the Man must leave. The Man steps out but is assaulted by two men in gorilla suits and tutus. They drag him back in, and dance while singing "Cube Sweet Cube!"

Two clowns enter, tell jokes, mock the Man for not laughing, and then leave. A child on a tricycle rides around, mocks the Man by saying he will never get out, then leaves. A monk shares wisdom, claiming he is part of the "All." He gives the Man an orb containing the meaning of life. After he leaves, the Man smashes it with his stool, finding it filled with strawberry jam. Arnie cleans it, noting most people break theirs. Six people bring a coffin, leaving a gun. The Man tries shooting himself, but ink squirts onto his face.

Everyone returns, laughing. Enraged, the Man asserts he is real and exits. The crowd applauds. He goes to an office where Dr. Connors is to sign his release. The Man cuts himself, only to see his blood is strawberry jam. Connors and the office fade, revealing the Man remains trapped. As credits roll, the Man sits on the floor, resigned to his fate, as the band's song reprises.

== Cast ==
- Richard Schaal as The Man in the Cube
- Hugh Webster as Arnie
- Rex Sevenoaks as Mr. Thomas
- Jack Van Evera as Himself/Watson
- Jon Granik as Straight Comic, Police Sergeant
- Guy Sanvido as Comic, Officer Fritz
- Eliza Creighton as Cora
- Don Crawford as Black Militant
- Jerry Nelson as Monk
- Sandra Scott as Miss Bix
- Claude Rae as Dr. Connors
- Don McGill as Professor
- Ralph Endersby as Guitarist
- Trudy Young as Liza 1
- Ruth Springford as Liza 2
- Moe Margolese as Dr. Bingham, Father-In-Law
- Alice Hill as Mother-In-Law, Mrs. Stratton
- Loro Farrell as Margaret
- William Osler as Scientist
- Eric Clavering as Dr. Bradowski, Old Man
- Jean Christopher as Nurse
- Jerry Juhl as Pipe-Smoking Party Guest (uncredited)
- Jim Henson as Gorillas (voice, uncredited)

== Release ==
The program was recorded in Toronto and aired later the same month. NBC aired the teleplay only twice: first on February 23, 1969, with a rerun on February 21, 1971. The Cube was considered a "lost film" for decades since it only aired on television twice, and was never officially released on early home video formats like VHS or Betamax.

The film aired in color, but only survived in a black and white print for years. In 2003, the film was rediscovered and digitized, and it began circulating on the internet. In 2008, the Jim Henson Company gave the film its first-ever legitimate commercial release.

== Adaptations ==
In 2007, the German Fringe Theater troupe Glassbooth presented a live stage adaptation of The Cube titled KUBUS, directed by Roger Hoffmann and starring Jens Dornheim.

In 2012, Tale of Sand, a graphic novel co-written by Henson and Juhl, was released utilizing similar set pieces and sight gags. Although released long after The Cube, the script for Tale of Sand actually predates it by several years.
