= Hillfield Strathallan College =

Location
- 299 Fennell Ave W, Hamilton; Hamilton, Ontario; Canada; 43.24010°N 79.89519°W

Information
- Type: Independent School
- Motto: Velle est Posse and Excelsior and Learn with Joy. Live with Purpose.
- Established: 1901
- Founder: John H. Collinson
- Headmaster: Marc Ayotte
- Grades: Montessori Toddler and Pre-Kindergarten to Grade 12
- Gender: Co-Ed
- Enrolment: 1300+
- Colours: Purple, Green and White
- Athletics: HSC Trojans
- Mascot: The Trojan
- Yearbook: Boar Pibroch
- Tuition: $7,935 - $27,802
- Website: www.hsc.on.ca

Hillfield Strathallan College is an independent, co-educational day school in Hamilton, Ontario, Canada. The academic program runs from Montessori Toddler and Pre-Kindergarten to Grade 12. The Head of college is Marc Ayotte.

Hillfield Strathallan College is divided into four schools: Montessori, Junior, Middle, and Senior School.

== History ==
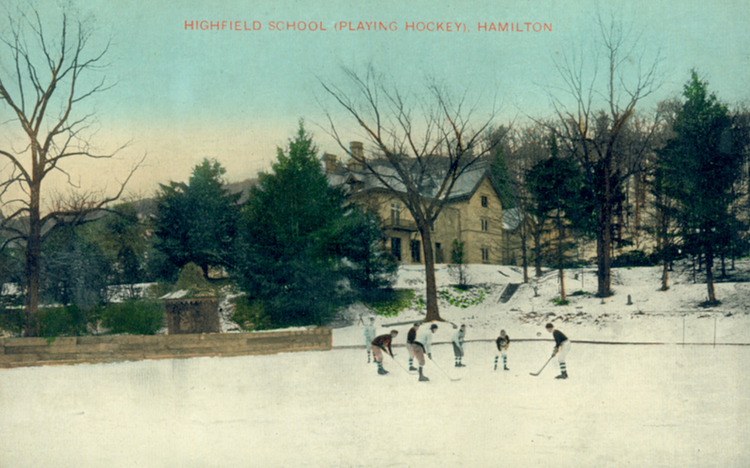
Postcard of Highfield School, circa 1910

Founded in 1901 as Highfield School for Boys, it was the first private residential and day school for boys in the city of Hamilton. It was a prep school for boys planning to enter the Royal Military College of Canada. Many graduates played key roles in the Canadian military. A series of name changes, reconstructions, new construction, and amalgamations with other institutions have since occurred, resulting in a single modern co-educational facility. Strathallan College was a school for girls nearby. Eventually, the two schools merged and began a co-education program. Alumni from all founding organizations attended the centennial celebration in 2001.

=== Timeline ===
- 1901 – Highfield School for Boys founded with premises on Aberdeen Avenue between Bay Street South and Ravenscliffe Avenue
- 1920 – Hillcrest School founded on the northwest corner of Main and Queen Streets, as a replacement for the previous school that burned down two years prior.
- 1923 – Strathallan School founded with premises on 15 Robinson Street in Hamilton.
- 1929 – Hillcrest School and Highfield School merged into Hillfield School, with new premises on Main Street West in Hamilton.
- A memorial plaque was unveiled as a list of honour In proud memory of Boys of Highfield School who gave their lives in the Great War
- mid-50s – 25 Robinson Street was purchased to augment the facilities.
- 1959 – The Hillfield School program was extended through Grade 13 and the school was renamed Hillfield College.
- 1961 – Strathallan School was renamed Strathallan College.
- 1962 – The two colleges, named Hillfield-Strathallan Colleges, were put under a single Board of Governors, which ran the colleges in co-ordinated but separate manner during a transition period. The new site of the college was acquired, a 50-acre (200,000 m^{2}) campus on 299 Fennell Avenue West on the Hamilton Mountain.
- 1963 – The schools operated as co-ordinate schools with a headmaster and headmistress.
- 1970s – The administrations consolidated and first the Primary, then the Senior and finally the Junior schools came together and co-educated. The 'New' Gym, now the Michael G. DeGroote Gym, was built and the Junior School extended.
- 1980s/1990s – Major additions to the campus, included the Library, new science labs, the Early Education Gym, the ARC, a new Montessori school (early education), state of the art music and art facilities and a brand new auditorium, the "Artsplex". The academic program was redesigned to reflect modern practice.
- 2005 – Hillfield Strathallan College acquires its own official coat of arms and a new HSC crest and flag, all unveiled for the first time by the Honourable Lincoln M. Alexander, former Lieutenant Governor of Ontario
- 2012 – The new Michael G. DeGroote Senior School opened its doors for the first time.
- 2020 – A new service named HSC@Home debuted.

== The College's buildings ==
The buildings have all been named after staff or benefactors who contributed to the development of the college.

=== Building names ===
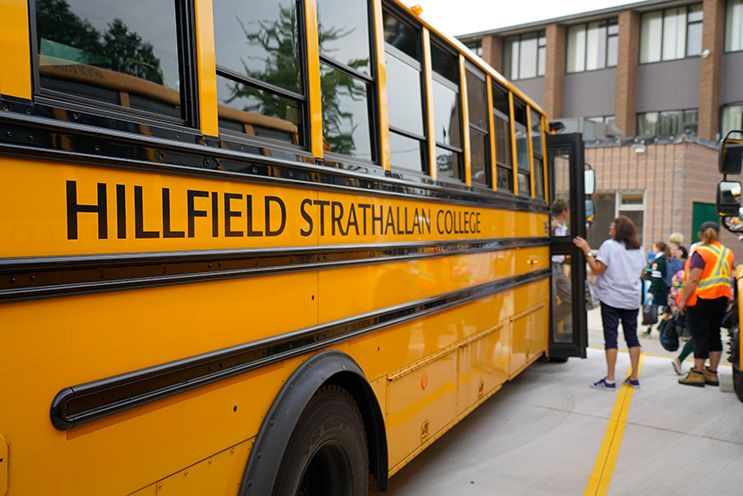
Hillfield Strathallan School Bus, circa 2019

- Page Building – Contains the page gym, along with all the locker rooms, and on the top floor is Lawson Hall, where the students eat lunch, and some formal functions take place.
- Holton Building – The school's administration building, home to the main office, the admissions office and the office of the Head of college.
- Wansbrough Building – Montessori Piazza
- Kemper Lounge – Located outside of the VFC it most often hosts open houses and receptions.
- The Virtue-Fitzgerald Centre for the Arts – A new building that houses the 450-seat, state-of-the-art theatre and the music facilities, including many practice studios (built in the 1980s and upgraded in 1999). Formerly referred to as the "Artsplex" Theatre
- DeGroote Triple Gymnasium – The newest school gymnasium, built by the generosity of Michael G. DeGroote, a very significant benefactor of the college. Contains 3 Courts "Spallaci, Siggy and King"
- Strathallan Building – Colloquially known as "Strath". Home to Director of Operations, Business Office, HR, Advancement Office, IT and Campus Store.
- Young Building – Houses the Middle School Science Laboratories, History Classroom and the Language Wing.
- Heaven Building – Houses the Middle School Math and English Classrooms.
- Collinson Building – Houses the Middle School Launch Pad, Geography Room and 2 Art Rooms.
- Parent's Guild – 3rd floor of Strathallan Building
- Board Room – Michael G. DeGroote Senior School.
- Montessori Building – It is the home to students in early education. Students ages 18 months–10 either attend the Montessori or Junior school.
- Killip Building – Junior school
- Killip Extension Building- Hold 2 Junior School classrooms, the Early-Ed Gym.
- Transportation Building – A new building that opened in September 2006 to house transportation staff offices, with solar panels installed later on.
- Michael G. DeGroote Senior School – State of the art building that was opened in September 2012. It houses the entirety of the Senior School

== House system ==
Houses are familial tradition, so if the child of an Old Boy or Old Girl attends Hillfield Strathallan College, that child will be placed in the same house as their parent. However, if both parents attended the college, children will be placed in the house of their father. House loyalty is very strong, and lives on through competitions for Old Boys and Old Girls at annual Homecoming celebrations.

The brother/sister houses and the corresponding house colours are:

- Pine/Yre – Yellow
- Maple/Tay – Orange
- Birch/Earn – Red
- Cedar/More – Blue

The Brother Houses are named after trees and their Sister Houses take their names from rivers in Scotland.

== Transportation ==
Hillfield Strathallan College has 28 school buses that bring around 70% of students to school every day. The school buses serve Hamilton, Ancaster, Dundas, Burlington, Stoney Creek, Upper and Lower Grimsby, Brantford, Oakville, Milton, Mississauga, Erin Mills, Waterdown, Carlisle, Kilbride and also smaller neighborhoods and towns.

== Theatre ==
Hillfield Strathallan College has been known for its dramatic productions and musicals. Musicals are performed in the fall term, and plays take place in the spring. All theatrical performances take place in the college's auditorium, "The Virtue-Fitzgerald Centre for the Arts."

== Crescendo Concert Series ==
The Crescendo Concert Series comprise three concerts per academic year, supports the college's arts scholarship program. Scholarship recipients have included Gema Zamprogna (1995–1997) and Lisa Jakub (1997–1998).

== Notable alumni ==
- Martin Beaver, classical violinist
- Henry Duncan Graham Crerar (b. 1888 d. 1965), Canadian general; commander-in-chief of the First Canadian Army in North-West Europe in the Second World War who had also reached the rank of lieutenant-colonel in the First World War
- Peter DeBoer, class of 1987; head coach, Vegas Golden Knights
- Jonathan Frid, television and stage actor; played the role of the reluctant vampire Barnabas Collins in the gothic soap opera Dark Shadows (1966–1971)
- Lisa Jakub, writer and actress
- Steve Paikin, class of 1978; host of TVOntario's public affairs program The Agenda.
- Kathleen Robertson, class of 1993; actress who played the role of Clare Arnold on Beverly Hills 90210 (1994–1997)
- Adrian Wu, class of 2008; Canadian fashion designer and entrepreneur.
- Dominic Zamprogna, class of 1998; television actor, currently on daytime soap opera General Hospital
- Gema Zamprogna, class of 1995; actress, played the role of Felicity King on Road to Avonlea (1989–1996)

== See also ==
- Education in Ontario
- List of secondary schools in Ontario
