= Charlotte Moore (actress) =

Canadian actress (born 1958)

- Born: 1958 (age 67–68); Halifax, Nova Scotia, Canada
- Occupation: Actor
- Spouse: Patric Masurkevitch (?–present)
- Relatives: Noah Shebib (nephew); Tedde Moore (sister); Mavor Moore (father); James Watt Mavor (granduncle); Dora Mavor Moore (grandmother); James Mavor (great-grandfather)
- Awards: Dora Mavor Moore Award

Charlotte Moore (born c. 1958) is a Canadian actress who has been performing for more than thirty years. Her acclaim includes a Dora Mavor Moore Award in 1990 for her performance as Janet in a Toronto production of The Rocky Horror Show.

== Acting career ==
Born in Halifax, Nova Scotia, Canada, Charlotte Moore is the daughter of Darwina (Faessler) and Mavor Moore, famed writer, producer and actor; and the granddaughter of Dora Mavor Moore, for whom the annual Toronto theatre awards are named. Her great-grandfather was economist James Mavor, her sister is actress Tedde Moore, and her nephew is actor and music producer Noah "40" Shebib.

She debuted in 1979 at the Charlottetown Festival. She has performed over the years at the Shaw Festival, and she co-produced a cabaret series in the late 1980s at The Rivoli in Toronto. She received acclaim for her 1989 performance as Janet in The Rocky Horror Show, and in 1990 played the narrator in a Toronto production of Joseph and the Amazing Technicolor Dreamcoat. In 2006 she returned to perform at the Charlottetown Festival.

Moore received a Dora Mavor Moore Award in 1990 for her performance in The Rocky Horror Show. Accepting the award, she exclaimed, "Rest in peace, grandma, one of us has finally won one of these things!"

In 1994, she played Fantine in a Halifax production of Les Misérables, at which time The Globe and Mail referred to her as "one of the strongest dramatic singers in Canada". Her career has included roles in productions staged at the Shaw Festival, the Charlottetown Festival, and many other productions in Toronto and around Ontario. Other theatre productions have included Grease, Gypsy, Blood Brothers, and Hairspray. She has also appeared in episodes of several television programs including E.N.G. and Psi Factor.

She released an album, Friends of Mine, on which she sings songs from Canadian musicals.

== Personal life ==
Her husband is actor Patric Masurkevitch. They live in Toronto.

== Albums ==
Friends of Mine

- Release date: 2004
- Formats: CD, music download
