= Tedde Moore =

Canadian actress (1947–2026)

- Born: Dorothea Mavor Moore; April 11, 1947; Toronto, Ontario, Canada
- Died: August 5, 2026 (aged 79); Huntsville, Ontario, Canada
- Occupation: Actress
- Years active: 1959–2017
- Partner: Donald Shebib (1976–2023; his death)
- Children: 4, including Noah Shebib
- Relatives: Charlotte Moore (sister); Mavor Moore (father); James Watt Mavor (granduncle); Dora Mavor Moore (grandmother); James Mavor (great-grandfather)

Dorothea Mavor Moore (April 11, 1947 – August 5, 2026), known professionally as Tedde Moore, was a Canadian actress, script editor, creative consultant and acting instructor.

== Early life ==
Tedde Moore was born on April 11, 1947, in Toronto, the daughter of Darwina (née Faessler) and actor and cultural icon Mavor Moore, the granddaughter of Canadian theatre actress Dora Mavor Moore, and the great-granddaughter of Scottish-born economist James Mavor.

She attended the Royal Academy of Dramatic Art in London, England and graduated in 1967 with the Principal's Medal of Honor.

== Career ==
Upon leaving RADA, she returned to Canada to star opposite Christopher Walken in the Stratford Festival's production of A Midsummer Night's Dream.

Moore is best known for playing Miss Shields in the 1983 film A Christmas Story. She reprised her role in the 1994 film My Summer Story and is the only actor to have appeared in both films.

Her film credits include Second Wind (1976), Murder by Decree (1979), Overnight (1985), and Down the Road Again (2011).

In 2011, Moore starred as Mrs. Claus in the TV movie Mistletoe over Manhattan and as Nanny Shaw in the mini-series The Kennedys. Moore's final acting credit came in the 2017 TV movie Magical Christmas Ornaments for the Hallmark Channel as part of its Hallmark Movies & Mysteries series.

== Personal life and death ==
Moore and her partner, filmmaker Donald Shebib, had two children — Noah and Suzanna — along with Moore's daughter, Zoë, from an earlier relationship with actor Patrick Christopher Carter. Moore also raised a foster daughter, Chaunce Drury. They remained together until Schebib's death on November 5, 2023 at the age of 85.

Zoë is a writer/producer and Suzanna is a teacher. Noah, better known as 40, is the music engineer and producer for the recording artist Drake.

Moore had five grandchildren.

=== Health and death ===
In 2009, Moore was diagnosed with multiple sclerosis, which led to her retirement from acting in 2017. She died in Huntsville, Ontario on August 5, 2026, at the age of 79.

== Filmography ==
=== Film ===
Year	Title	Role	Notes
1971	Rip-Off	Nancy	
1976	Second Wind	Paula	
1979	Murder by Decree	Mrs. Lees	
1981	The Amateur	Newscaster	
1983	A Christmas Story	Miss Shields	
1985	Overnight	Leslie	
1987	Rolling Vengeance	Misty's Mother	
1987	Taking Care of Terrific	Mrs. Cameron	TV movie
1987	Mr. Nobody	Narrator	Short film
1992	Terror on Track 9	Bank Manager	TV movie
1994	My Summer Story	Miss Shields	
1995	The Man in the Attic	Another wife	TV movie
1996	The Deliverance of Elaine	Mary Ann	TV movie
1996	Gotti	Judge	TV movie
1996	Undue Influence	Corrections Officer	TV movie
1999	God's New Plan	Kate Young	TV movie
2001	Focus	Woman #1 in Theater	
2002	Torso: The Evelyn Dick Story	Nurse Gowtand	TV movie
2002	The Scream Team	Friendly Woman	TV movie
2003	Rolie Polie Olie: The Baby Bot Chase	Polie-Anna	TV movie
2008	A Christmas Story Documentary: Road Trip for Ralphie	Herself	
2008	The Untold Christmas Story	Herself	
2009	Clarkworld	Herself	
2011	Down the Road Again	Annie Burns	
2012	The Cast of a Christmas Story: Where Are They Now?	Herself	TV movie
2014	The Anniversary	Evelyn	
2017	High-Rise Rescue	Maxine Smith	
2017	Magical Christmas Ornaments		

=== Television ===
Year	Title	Role	Notes
1961	Encounter		Episode: "Breaking Point"
1972–1975	Police Surgeon	Ruth/Mary/Wilma/Marta Morgan/Amy	5 episodes
1977	Sidestreet	Eleanor Slater	Episode: "Stakeout"
1980	The Littlest Hobo	Mrs. Baxter	Episode: "Snapshot"
1980	For the Record		Episode: "Lyon's Den"
1988	T. and T.	Mrs. Lewelyn	Episode: "And Baby Makes Nine"
1989–1990	Friday the 13th: The Series	Nurse Dana/Dr. Meade	2 episodes
1992	E.N.G.	Dr. Holtfield	Episode: "Harvest"
1995	Avonlea	Guest #2	Episode: "What a Tangled Web We Weave"
1996	PSI Factor: Chronicles of the Paranormal	Sarah Kilmartin	Episode: "The Transient/Two Lost Old Men"
2001	RoboCop: Prime Directives	The Old Woman (CEO)	2 episodes
2002	Odyssey 5	Video Shrink	Episode: "L.D.U. 7"
2003–2004	Rolie Polie Olie	Polie-Anna (voice)	6 episodes
2005	This Is Wonderland	Stacey's Grandma	1 episode
2011	The Kennedys	Mrs. Shaw	3 episodes

== Awards ==
In 1976, Moore won Best Supporting Actress for her role as Paula in the film Second Wind at the 27th Canadian Film Awards.

In 1984, Moore was nominated for Best Supporting Actress for her role as Miss Shields in the film A Christmas Story at the 5th Genie Awards.

In 2001, Moore won the Dora Mavor Moore Best Actress Award for her performance on stage in The Walls of Africa.
