= Our (Almost Completely True) Love Story =

- Official poster
- Directed by: Don Scardino
- Written by: Jerry Sroka; Mariette Hartley
- Starring: Mariette Hartley; Jerry Sroka; Bernie Kopell; Tess Harper; Morgan Fairchild
- Release date: 2021
- Running time: 92 minutes
- Country: United States
- Language: English

Our (Almost Completely True) Love Story is a 2021 American romantic comedy drama film written by Jerry Sroka and Mariette Hartley, directed by Don Scardino and starring Hartley, Sroka, Bernie Kopell, Tess Harper and Morgan Fairchild.

== Cast ==
- Jerry Sroka as Jerry
- Mariette Hartley as Mariette
- Peter MacNicol as Psycho Date
- Don Scardino as Don
- Bernie Kopell as Bernie
- Jack McGee as Bart
- Peter Onorati as Eric
- John Rubinstein as Dr. Morrow
- Stuart Pankin as Buster
- Tess Harper as Tess
- Morgan Fairchild as Morgan
- Mindy Sterling as Maxine
- Sam McMurray as Sam

== Reception ==
Sabina Dana Plasse of Film Threat rated the film a 7.5 out of 10.

Neely Swanson of The Beverly Hills Courier gave the film a positive review and wrote, “I really liked this movie and not just because I knew the story and the protagonists; I liked it because it was fun, well-made, and hit the target.”

Prairie Miller of WBAI also gave the film a positive review and wrote, "When Bette Davis proclaimed that 'Old age is not for Sissies' she likely had in mind the acting world as well. And Our (Almost Completely True) Love Story is a marvelous tribute to that struggle, a defiant romance playing out simultaneously on and off screen between thespian veterans Mariette Hartley and Jerry Sroka, long term lovers with a passion for acting and each other, and in eventual wedlock."

== Awards ==
The film won the LA Film Awards for Best Comedy and Best Original Story.
