= The Challengers (film) =

- VHS cover
- Written by: Clive Endersby
- Directed by: Eric Till
- Starring: Gema Zamprogna; Gwynyth Walsh; Eric Christmas
- Music by: Eric N. Robertson
- Country of origin: Canada
- Original language: English

Production
- Producer: Ralph Endersby
- Running time: 97 min.

Original release
- Network: Canadian Broadcasting Corporation
- Release: 14 October 1990

The Challengers is a 1990 family television film that was produced by Lauron Productions for CBC Television. It stars Gema Zamprogna (best known for her role on Road to Avonlea), Gwynyth Walsh and Eric Christmas. The film features the Jon and Vangelis song "I'll Find My Way Home".

The film was first broadcast in Canada on 14 October 1990 through CBC Television. BBC One aired the film in the United Kingdom on 3 August 1993. The film also had frequent showings on The Disney Channel. Triboro Entertainment provided the video release on VHS.

It was shot in Winnipeg and Stonewall, Manitoba.

== Plot ==
After her father dies, Mackie and her mom move to a new town. As she makes new friends, she discovers a band she wants to join. The only problem is, the band consists of only boys and no girls are allowed. She comes up with the idea to dress like a boy to join the band and be part of "The Challengers". Balancing between dressing up as a guy in the band and being a normal girl with her best friend Jenny is harder than she thought.

== Cast ==
- Gema Zamprogna...Mackie/Mac Daniels
- Gwynyth Walsh...Angie Daniels
- Eric Christmas...Zack
- Steven Andrade...Jonathan
- Martin Smits...Carroll
- Matthew Beckett...Lennon
- Sarah Sawatsky...Jenny Blair
- Chioma Patterson (who played Jasmine on The Rockets in 1987-1991)...Sue
- Joelle Proeber (who played Muffy in The Rockets in 1987-1991)...Girl in Classroom

== See also ==
- Road to Avonlea
