= Tess Harper =

American actress (born 1950)

- Born: Tessie Jean Washam; August 15, 1950 (age 76); Mammoth Spring, Arkansas, U.S.
- Occupation: Actress
- Years active: 1983–present
- Spouse: Ken Harper (m. 1971; div. 1976)

External image
- Harper in 1984

Tessie Jean Harper (née Washam; born August 15, 1950) is an American actress. She was nominated for the Golden Globe Award for Best Supporting Actress for her first film role in 1983's Tender Mercies, and for the Academy Award for Best Supporting Actress for the 1986 film Crimes of the Heart. Her other film appearances include Amityville 3-D (1983), Flashpoint (1984), Ishtar (1987), Far North (1988), and No Country for Old Men (2007). She also had a recurring role on the first three seasons of Breaking Bad (2008–2010) as Jesse Pinkman’s mother, as well as reprising her role in El Camino: A Breaking Bad Movie (2019).

== Early life ==
Harper grew up in Mammoth Spring, Arkansas, the daughter of Rosemary and Ed Washam, who operated Washam's Hardware. Harper has a brother and sister. She graduated from Mammoth Spring High School and attended Arkansas State University-Beebe, earning an associate degree in Fine Arts, before transferring to Southwest Missouri State University (now Missouri State University) in Springfield, Missouri, graduated with a degree in education, and taught ninth-grade English in Springfield, Missouri.

== Career ==
Harper began acting in theater productions, theme parks (including Dogpatch, USA and Silver Dollar City), dinner theater, and children's theater. She moved to Texas in order to appear in television commercials. The institution wanted to produce a TV spot and asked her to be in the spot, which she accepted. In a twist of fate, a casting person with Tender Mercies had to spend the night in Dallas and saw Harper's spot on TV. She called Robert Duvall and arranged an audition. Director Bruce Beresford was impressed with Harper and cast her in the lead female role of Rosa Lee, the young widow and mother who marries country singer Mac Sledge. Beresford said that Harper brought a kind of rural quality to the role without coming across as simple or foolish. He said of Harper, "She walked into the room and even before she spoke, I thought, 'That's the girl to play the lead.'" Harper did not realize this, and recalled shortly after the film's release, "After I did the final screen test, I went to see Breaker Morant and started sobbing uncontrollably halfway through it. A friend had to take me home, and I kept crying, 'You don't understand! They're not gonna let me do this part!'"

Tender Mercies was Harper's feature film debut. She earned a Golden Globe Award nomination for the role.

Harper appeared in the TV mini-series Chiefs (1983) and Celebrity (1984), as well as many television movies including Starflight: The Plane That Couldn't Land (1983) and Reckless Disregard (1985). In 1983, she appeared in the full-length feature Silkwood. In 1986, Harper was nominated for the Academy Award for Best Supporting Actress for her work as Chick Boyle in Crimes of the Heart, which was directed by her Tender Mercies director Bruce Beresford. She later played parts in Ishtar (1987), Far North (1988), The Man in the Moon (1991), The Jackal (1997) and Loggerheads (2005). She also took part in Michael Jackson's music video "Black or White" (1991), playing the mother.

From 1994 to 1995 Harper had a regular role on the CBS series Christy, playing mountain woman Fairlight Spencer. She also had a recurring role on another CBS television series, Early Edition, from 1996 to 2000. She portrayed the mother of lead character Gary Hobsen. Harper shared a Screen Actors Guild Award (in the Best Ensemble Cast category) with her fellow cast members in the Oscar-winning film No Country for Old Men, in which she played the wife of Tommy Lee Jones's character.

She had the recurring role of Mrs. Pinkman on Breaking Bad, appearing in the first three seasons, as well as the sequel Netflix movie El Camino: A Breaking Bad Movie.

== Filmography ==
=== Film ===
Year	Title	Role	Notes
1983	Tender Mercies	Rosa Lee	
1983	Amityville 3-D	Nancy Baxter	
1983	Silkwood	Linda Dawson	
1984	Flashpoint	Ellen	
1986	Crimes of the Heart	Chick Boyle	
1987	Ishtar	Willa Rogers	
1988	Far North	Rita	
1988	Criminal Law	Det. Stillwell	
1989	Her Alibi	Sally Blackwood	
1990	Daddy's Dyin': Who's Got the Will?	Sara Lee Turnover	
1991	My Heroes Have Always Been Cowboys	Cheryl Dalton-Hornby	
1991	The Man in the Moon	Abigail Trant	
1991	Pretty Hattie's Baby	Maya	
1992	The Turning	Martha Harnish	
1992	My New Gun	Kimmy Hayes	
1996	Dirty Laundry	Beth Greene	
1997	The Jackal	The First Lady	
2000	The In Crowd	Dr. Amanda Giles	
2001	The Rising Place	Rebecca Hodge	
2001	Morning	Margaret	
2003	Studio City	Linda Little	Short
2005	Loggerheads	Elizabeth	
2005	Jesus, Mary and Joey	Liz O'Callahan	
2006	Karla	Molly Czehowicz	
2006	Jam	Ruby	
2006	Broken Bridges	Dixie Rose Delton	
2006	Broken	Clare	
2007	No Country for Old Men	Loretta Bell	
2007	Kiss the Bride	Barbara	
2007	Saving Sarah Cain	Miriam Esh	
2009	Fatal Secrets	Naomi	
2013	Sunlight Jr.	Kathleen	
2014	Hello, My Name Is Frank	Aunt Flossie	
2014	Frank	Frank's mum	
2015	Surprise	Linda	Short
2015	The Perfect Guy	Mrs. McCarthy	
2018	Burden	Hazel Griffin	
2019	El Camino: A Breaking Bad Movie	Diane Pinkman	
2020	The Evening Hour	Dorothy Freeman	
2021	Our (Almost Completely True) Love Story	Tess	
2023	American Outlaws	Loretta Hillhouse	

=== Television ===
Year	Title	Role	Notes
1983	Kentucky Woman	Lorna Whateley	TV film
1983	Starflight: The Plane That Couldn't Land	Janet Briggs	TV film
1983	Chiefs	Carrie Lee	TV miniseries
1984	Celebrity	Susan French	TV miniseries
1985	A Summer to Remember	Jeannie Wyler	TV film
1985	Promises to Keep	Gwen Palmer	TV film
1986	The Twilight Zone	Sarah	Episode: "Quarantine"
1986	Reckless Disregard	Meredith Craig	TV film
1987	Murder, She Wrote	Irene Rutledge	Episode: "Simon Says, Color Me Dead"
1987	L.A. Law	Patricia Pittman	Episode: "Sparky Brackman R.I.P. ????-1987"
1987	Daddy	Ann Burnette	TV film
1988	Little Girl Lost	Clara Brady	TV film
1989	Unconquered	Mary Flowers	TV film
1989	Incident at Dark River	Betty McFall	TV film
1990	Thirtysomething	Deborah	Episode: "Post-Op"
1992	In the Line of Duty: Siege at Marion	Vickie Singer	TV film
1992	Willing to Kill: The Texas Cheerleader Story	Verna Heath	TV film
1993	The Hidden Room	Dede	Episode: "After the Crash"
1994–95	Christy	Fairlight Spencer	Main role
1995	Death in Small Doses	Asst. D.A. Jerri Sims	TV film
1996	The Road to Galveston	Julia Archer	TV film
1996	A Stranger to Love	Linda Grant	TV film
1997	The Killing Secret	Tina De Capprio	TV film
1997	Grace Under Fire	Joan	Episode: "Matthew's Old Lady"
1997	A Child's Wish	Joanna Chandler	TV film
1997	Gun	Virginia	Episode: "Ricochet"
1997	Walker, Texas Ranger	Katie Malloy	Episode: "Sons of Thunder"
1997	Cracker	Lea Ann Garner	Episode: "An American Dream"
1998–2000	Early Edition	Lois Hobson	Recurring role
1999	Beyond the Prairie	Narrator / Older Laura Ingalls Wilder	TV film
2000	Touched by an Angel	Betsy Baxter	Episode: "The Empty Chair"
2001	CSI: Crime Scene Investigation	Julia Barrett	Episode: "Bully for You"
2002	Beyond the Prairie, Part 2	Narrator / Older Laura Ingalls Wilder	TV film
2003	The Division	Polly Danko	Episode: "Oh Mother, Who Art Thou?"
2004	One Tree Hill	May Scott	Episode: "Crash Course in Polite Conversations"
2004	Jack & Bobby	Karen Carmichael	Episodes: "Pilot", "An Innocent Man"
2004	Angel in the Family	Mrs. Nelly Tomkins	TV film
2005	Judging Amy	Barbara Nissman	Episode: "Sorry I Missed You"
2007	Without a Trace	Mrs. Spade	Episode: "At Rest"
2007	Brothers & Sisters	Beth Ridge	Episode: "History Repeating"
2007	Judy's Got a Gun	Susan Lemen	TV film
2008	Ghost Whisperer	Ellen Wilkins	Episode: "Stranglehold"
2008–10	Breaking Bad	Diane Pinkman	Recurring role
2009	Law & Order: Special Victims Unit	Mrs. Hallander	Episode: "Stranger"
2009	Cold Case	Sharon Lertola	Episode: "November 22"
2009	Crash	Wendy Olinville	Recurring role
2010	Proposition 8 Trial Re-Enactment	Sandy Stier	TV documentary
2010	Grey's Anatomy	Pam Nelson	Episode: "Perfect Little Accident"
2010	In Plain Sight	A.U.S.A. Rolly	Episode: "Coma Chameleon"
2011	Private Practice	Augusta King	Episode: "Something Old, Something New"
2011	A Christmas Wish	Trudy Willis	TV film
2012	Revenge	Carole Miller	Episodes: "Absolution", "Grief"
2012	The Christmas Heart	Elizabeth	TV film
2014	True Detective	Mrs. Kelly	Episode: "Seeing Things"
2014	Nikki & Nora: The N&N Files	Mary Delaney	2 episodes
2015	Criminal Minds	Dinah Troy	Episode: "Rock Creek Park"
2019	How to Get Away with Murder	Sheila Miller	Episode: "We Know Everything"

== Awards and nominations ==
Year	Association	Category	Nominated work	Result
1984	Golden Globe Award	Best Performance by an Actress in a Supporting Role in a Motion Picture	Tender Mercies	Nominated
1987	Academy Awards	Best Actress in a Supporting Role	Crimes of the Heart	Nominated
1994	CableACE Award	Actress in a Dramatic Series	The Hidden Room	Nominated
2004	Method Fest	Best Actress in a Short Film	Lonely Place	Won
2007	National Board of Review	Best Acting by an Ensemble	No Country for Old Men	Won
2008	Screen Actors Guild Award	Outstanding Performance by a Cast in a Motion Picture	No Country for Old Men	Won
2008	Gold Derby Awards	Ensemble Cast	No Country for Old Men	Won
2011	California Independent Film Festival	Lifetime Achievement Award		Won
