= The Soulmates in The Gift of Light =

1991 TV special

- Written by: Gabrielle St. George
- Directed by: Chris Shouten
- Starring: Al Waxman; Sheila McCarthy; Gema Zamprogna; Wayne Robson; John Stocker; Ray Landry; Robert Cait; Kurt Reis
- Music by: Domenic Troiano
- Country of origin: United States
- Original language: English

Production
- Producers: Gary Franklin; Gabrielle St. George; Dom Vetro
- Running time: 24 minutes
- Production companies: Soulmates Productions; Jade Animation; Alliance Entertainment

Original release
- Network: CBC Television
- Release: November 27, 1991

The Soulmates in The Gift of Light, also known as The Christmas Gift of Light, is a Canadian animated Christmas special produced by Soulmates Productions and distributed by Alliance Entertainment, which premiered on CBC Television on November 27, 1991. It aired for five years and sold internationally, then was released on VHS by Questar Video in 1995 as a part of Christmas Cartoon Adventures, a compilation of animated Christmas television specials.

== Plot ==
On the night before Christmas, the evil Angis McBragg, a villain with negative magic powers, and his elf henchman Doubting Thomas terrorize a village. Attempting to dislodge Santa Claus from the North Pole, McBragg announces his plans to make children everywhere doubt their abilities and lose confidence. At the same time Ella, a blind girl, is about to go on a walk with her guide dog, Truman. McBragg zaps Truman's eyes to disorient him. Unaware of this, Ella walks into the street and is nearly run over by a car. Not knowing what happened, Truman feels shamed and despairs that his eyesight is failing.

At his monitoring station, Santa reads the news about crime, robberies and war in the paper. Assuming that the numbers of naughtiness have been rising on their own, he loses hope in humanity and himself and abandons his workshop. Meanwhile, in space, Good Soul, a moon, senses a distress call from Santa's head reindeer Comet. Comet laments Santa's absence and decides to search for him. Good Soul gives Orion and Orillia, two hoverboard-riding extraterrestrial "soulmates" from another planet, their first mission to save Christmas, and they travel to Earth.

Thomas is hired at Santa's workshop, with no one except Comet seeing anything suspicious about him. One of the elves, Pops, points out that Thomas was highly recommended from his (actually forged) references. At Ella's house, Truman, unable to get over what almost happened to his owner, decides to run away. While flying in the sky, Comet runs into the Soulmates. Accepting their offer of help, he tells them that Santa has run away, and that if he can't find him, Christmas is doomed. The Soulmates tell Comet that if he believes in himself, he will find Santa. At that moment, McBragg appears and kidnaps Orillia, and Orion and Comet find Santa and Truman in the park on a bench. Santa insists that he is not going back to the North Pole, and that the spirit of Christmas has been lost.

Back at the North Pole, Thomas tells the other elves that they need to find a new leader. McBragg arrives to put his plan into motion; on Christmas morning, every child in the world will get a Thomas doll. The toys will shoot out beams of negative energy that will make everybody doubt themselves. McBragg imprisons Orillia, insisting on using her as a test subject for the doll. Meanwhile, Orion tells Comet that he and Orillia have the power of "Magic Imagining" to make people believe in themselves. He uses his Soulmate powers to contact Orillia, who imagines herself helping Santa and Truman believe in themselves. The Soulmates' Positivity Beam drifts from the workshop to Ella's house, where she is writing a letter to Santa about how she misses Truman. The beam carries the letter away. McBragg uses the Thomas doll on Orillia, turning her into a self-doubting grouch. Orion begs the others to help them with his Magic Imagining. Comet sends some pixie dust up to Good Soul, who in turn uses "Soulmate Energy" to snap Orillia out of her trance. The energy also turns Thomas into a nicer person.

Orion asks Santa and Truman if they are coming with him to the North Pole, but Santa refuses and tells him and Comet to go home. Back at the North Pole, Thomas voices his concerns to McBragg about the appropriateness of the Thomas doll. McBragg then notices that Orillia is back to normal, but it does not matter, for his dolls are about to be delivered everywhere. At the park, Santa and Truman receive Ella's letter, which moves them to tears. Santa realizes that there is at least one good person still left, and is convinced to return to the North Pole. Pops tells McBragg that everything is packed and loaded, but the reindeer refuse to participate. McBragg declares that he will have the elves pull the sleigh instead. Fortunately, Orion and Comet show up, followed by Santa and Truman. Santa uses some Soulmate Energy to turn the Thomas dolls into nice dolls who talk about the importance of believing in oneself. McBragg flees the workshop in his limousine sleigh, crashing into a chimney on the way.

Santa takes off in his sleigh with Truman and the Soulmates. Truman realizes that the letter was from Ella, and Orion and Orillia tell him that he has guided Santa back to the North Pole with his now-improved eyesight. The dog is then reunited with his owner, and the two look out the window as Santa and the Soulmates fly away in the night sky. Good Soul appears, saying that it is "positively a Merry Christmas".

== Voice cast ==
- Al Waxman as Angris McBragg
- Sheila McCarthy as Orillia and Ella's Mother
- Gema Zamprogna as Ella
- Wayne Robson as Orion
- John Stocker as Truman, Driver and Doubting Thomas
- Ray Landry as Santa Claus, Street Corner Santa and Pops
- Robert Cait as Comet
- Kurt Reis as Good Soul

== Production ==
The Soulmates in The Gift of Light was created, written, and produced by Canadian screenwriter, artist, editor and author Gabrielle St. George, and directed by Chris Shouten. Production on the special began in 1989. All the pre-production and post-production was done in Canada. The special was produced by Jade Animation in China. St. George sent Shouten to live overseas for 6–9 months to oversee the special's production. The character designs were done by Shouten and animator Greg Duffell. The songs "Soulmates Theme" and "Don't Forget Me" were produced and arranged by Howard Ayee and Domenic Troiano, sung by Shawne Jackson and Joel Feeney, and recorded and mixed by Bob Federer and Danny Sustar at Round Sound Studios. In 1997, St. George and Shouten had a deal for a series with Paragon Entertainment Corporation, who was buying up a lot of animated films, series and companies at the time. The series would have followed the Soulmates' adventures as they helped marginalized humans and creatures who had lost faith in themselves, their dreams, and their hopes. However, Paragon went bankrupt shortly after in 1998.

== Online search ==
In 2016, an image of the elf character Pops from the special playing on a television in a family photograph sparked a large online search for its origin. It would not be until September 2022 after a new tweet by the original poster and a video by YouTuber Blameitonjorge that the special would be ultimately identified and found. The mystery even caught the attention of Gabrielle St. George, the special's creator, who said that she had no idea that her "decades-old cartoon elf" had become an internet mystery.
