= Far North (1988 film) =

1988 American comedy-drama film by Sam Shepard

- Theatrical release poster
- Directed by: Sam Shepard
- Written by: Sam Shepard
- Produced by: Carolyn Pfeiffer; Malcolm R. Harding
- Starring: Jessica Lange; Charles Durning; Tess Harper; Donald Moffat; Ann Wedgeworth; Patricia Arquette; Nina Draxten
- Cinematography: Robbie Greenberg
- Edited by: Bill Yahraus
- Music by: The Red Clay Ramblers
- Production company: Alive Films
- Distributed by: Nelson Entertainment
- Release date: September 10, 1988
- Running time: 89 minutes
- Country: United States
- Language: English
- Budget: $5 million
- Box office: $147,234

Far North is a 1988 American comedy-drama film written and directed by Sam Shepard. The film stars Jessica Lange, Charles Durning, Tess Harper, Donald Moffat, Ann Wedgeworth and Patricia Arquette.

== Premise ==
After her father is injured in a horse-riding accident, a young woman faces the trials and tribulations of her dysfunctional, countryside family when he pressures her into euthanizing the horse.

== Cast ==
- Jessica Lange as Kate
- Charles Durning as Bertrum
- Tess Harper as Rita
- Donald Moffat as Uncle Dane
- Ann Wedgeworth as Amy
- Patricia Arquette as Jilly
- Nina Draxten as Gramma

== Release ==
Far North had its premiere at the 1988 Toronto International Film Festival on September 10, 1988 where it had a mixed reaction.

== Reception ==
Gene Siskel named it among 1988's worst films, calling it a "stunningly bad movie and badly directed too". On the review aggregator website Rotten Tomatoes, 13% of 8 critics' reviews are positive.
