= Martin Beaver =

Canadian violinist

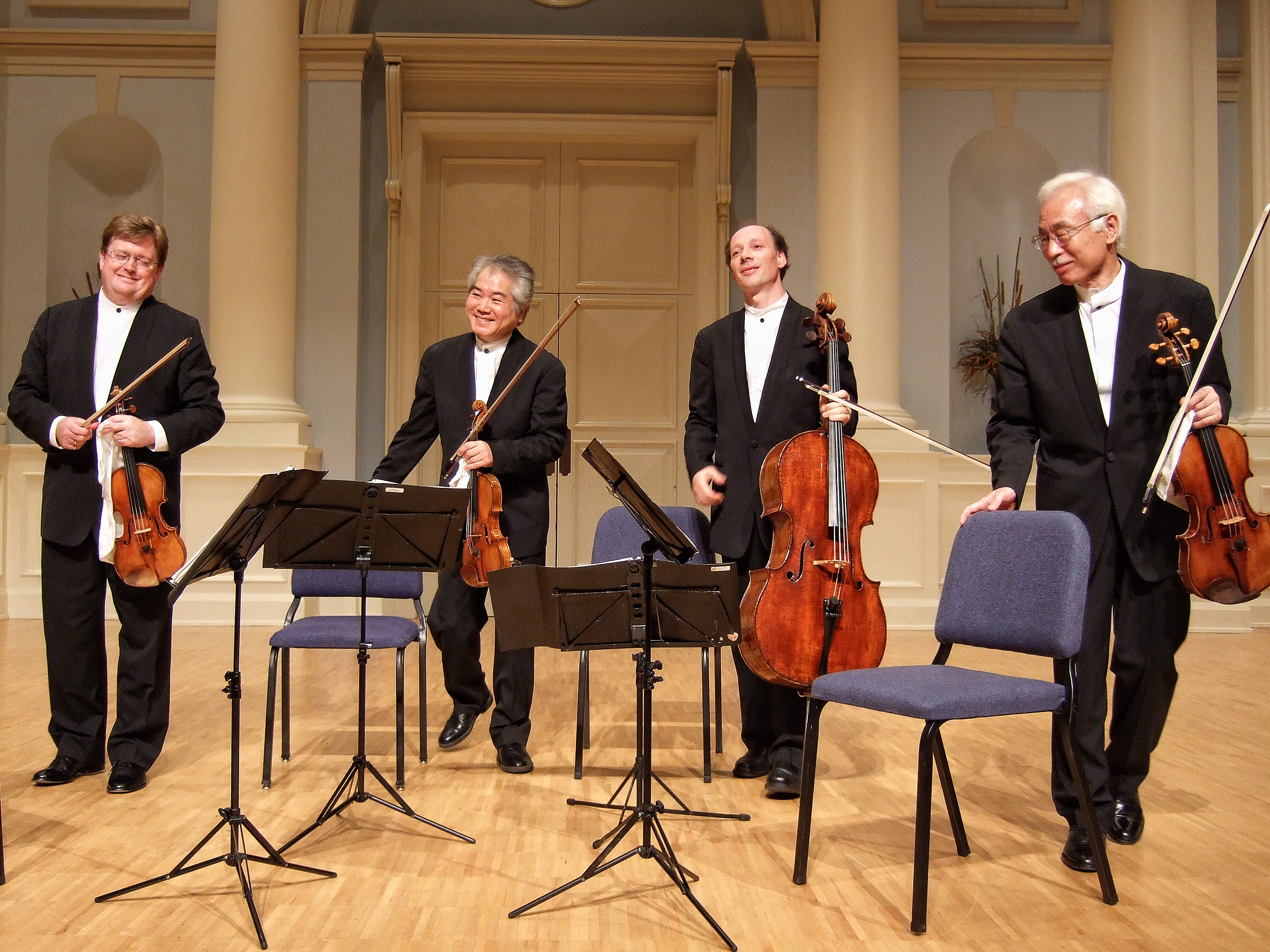
Tokyo String Quartet

Martin Beaver (born November 10, 1967) is a Canadian violinist. He was the first violinist of the Tokyo String Quartet from 2002 until its final season in 2013. As a part of the Tokyo String Quartet, he played the Paganini-Comte Cozio di Salabue violin (circa 1727) on loan from the Nippon Music Foundation, part of the Paganini Quartet collection of instruments made by Antonio Stradivari. He currently performs on a violin made by Nicolò Bergonzi.

Beaver is now on the faculty at the Colburn School in Los Angeles and remains active as both a chamber musician and soloist. In 2013, he founded the Montrose Trio with pianist Jon Kimura Parker and cellist Clive Greensmith.

== Early life ==
Martin Beaver was born in Winnipeg, and raised in Hamilton, Canada. His early violin teachers include Claude Letourneau and Carlisle Wilson. Subsequently, he studied violin with Victor Danchenko at the Royal Conservatory of Music, Henryk Szeryng at the Conservatoire de Musique de Geneve, and Josef Gingold at Indiana University. He also played with the Hamilton Philharmonic Youth Orchestra for many years.

== Awards ==
- Top prizes at the 1990 International Violin Competition of Indianapolis, the 1991 Montreal International Music Competition, and 1993 Queen Elisabeth Competition
- 1993: Virginia P. Moore Award from the Canada Council for the Arts
- 2013: Sanford Medal from Yale University

== Teaching ==
Beaver has taught at The Royal Conservatory of Music, the University of British Columbia, Hillfield Strathallan College the Peabody Conservatory of Music of Johns Hopkins University, the Steinhardt School of New York University, and has been the Artist in Residence at the Yale School of Music. During the fall of 2013, Beaver joined the faculty at The Colburn School as co-director of the String Chamber Music Studies Program and Professor of violin.

== Recordings ==
Beaver has recorded for the Rene Gailly, Naim Audio, NAXOS and both of Canadian Broadcast Corporation’s record labels. With the Tokyo String Quartet, he recorded with Harmonia Mundi and Biddulph Recordings.
