= Homer (film) =

- Theatrical release poster
- Directed by: John Trent
- Written by: Claude Harz; Matt Clark
- Screenplay by: Claude Harz
- Produced by: Terence Dene; Steven North
- Starring: Don Scardino; Tisa Farrow; Alex Nicol
- Cinematography: Laszlo George
- Edited by: Michael Menne
- Music by: Don Scardino
- Production companies: Cinema Center Films; Palomar Pictures
- Distributed by: National General Pictures
- Release dates: September 21, 1970 (Louisville, Kentucky); September 30, 1970 (Los Angeles); November 23, 1970 (New York City)
- Running time: 91 minutes
- Country: United States
- Language: English

Homer is a 1970 Canadian-American drama film directed by John Trent and starring Don Scardino, Tisa Farrow and Alex Nicol.

The film was entered in competition at the 22nd Canadian Film Awards in 1970, although its inclusion was controversial; it was shot in Canada with a Canadian director, but financed by an American studio and told a story set in the United States, resulting in some debate about whether the film was sufficiently Canadian.

== Plot ==
A high school graduate, named Homer Edwards, experiences the pains of the generation gap and the Vietnam War in the late 1960s while growing up in Schomberg, Wisconsin.

== Cast ==
- Don Scardino as Homer Edwards
- Tisa Farrow as Laurie Grainger
- Alex Nicol as Mr. Harry Edwards
- Lenka Peterson as Mrs. Edwards
- Tim Henry as Eddie Cochran
- Tom Harvey as Mr. Jess Tibbet
- Jan Campbell as Mrs. Grainger
- Arch McDonnell as Mr. Grainger
- Ralph Endersby as Hector
- Murray Westgate as Mr. Cochran
- Mona O'Hearn as Mrs. Cochran
- Bob Warner as Sheriff
- Trudy Young as Sally
- Allen Doremus as Minister

== Filming locations ==
- Schomberg, Ontario
- Unionville, Ontario
- Palgrave, Ontario

== Critical reception ==
A contemporary review in The Village Voice described the film as having "an excessive amount of music and its fair share of gratuitous lyrical photography" and "small talk [that] is over-extended and becomes a kind of slack parody," but noted that "Tim Henry's performance as the doomed young man is miraculous, and there is no way of knowing how much of it is due to genius and how much to luck." A review of the film in TV Guide described it as "[w]ell meaning though cliché," "riddled with cliched shots of sunsets, sex scenes in silhouette, and dope smoking," and that the "direction is far too simplistic, as is the script."

== See also ==
- List of American films of 1970
