= Don Scardino =

American producer, director, and retired actor

- Born: Donald Joseph Scardino; February 17, 1949 (age 77); New York City, U.S.
- Occupations: Director; producer; actor
- Years active: 1965–present
- Spouse: Pamela Blair (m. 1984; div. 1991)

Donald Joseph Scardino (born February 17, 1949) is an American television director, producer, and retired actor.

== Career ==
=== Acting ===
Scardino was born in New York City, to jazz musician parents, Dorothy Denny Scardino and Charles Scardino. His first Broadway credit was as an understudy in The Playroom in 1965. Additional Broadway acting credits include Johnny No-Trump, Godspell, and King of Hearts. Off-Broadway he appeared in The Rimers of Eldritch, The Comedy of Errors, Moonchildren, and I'm Getting My Act Together and Taking It on the Road, he was also the lead in a B horror movie titled Squirm in 1976.

He starred in several episodes of the CBS Radio Mystery Theater, which ran from 1974 to 1982. He served as artistic director at Playwrights Horizons from 1991 to 1996. On television he appeared on the daytime soap operas Guiding Light, All My Children, Love Is a Many Splendored Thing, and Another World and the primetime series The Ghost & Mrs. Muir and The Name of the Game. Feature film credits include The People Next Door (1970), Homer (1970), Rip-Off (1971), Squirm (1976), Cruising (1980) and He Knows You're Alone (1980).

In 2020, Scardino appeared as a guest on The Big Alakens Big Lake marathon fundraiser episode of The George Lucas Talk Show.

=== Directing ===
Following his acting on the network soap operas, Scardino began to direct them. He directed episodes of Another World, One Life to Live, and All My Children. He went on to direct plays on and off-Broadway, including the world premiere of Aaron Sorkin's A Few Good Men. He has directed extensively in television, most notably Tracey Takes On... and 30 Rock.

Feature film directing work includes Me and Veronica (Venice Film Festival), and Advice from a Caterpillar, winner, best comedy, at Aspen Comedy Festival. He directed the 2013 film The Incredible Burt Wonderstone, starring Jim Carrey and Steve Carell.

== Awards and nominations ==
Year	Award	Category	Work	Result
1986	Daytime Emmy Awards	Outstanding Young Man in a Drama Series	Another World	Nominated
1994	Primetime Emmy Awards	Outstanding Directing for a Variety or Music Program	Tracey Takes on New York	Nominated
1998	Primetime Emmy Awards	Outstanding Directing for a Variety or Music Program	Tracey Takes On...	Nominated
1998	Directors Guild of America Awards	Outstanding Directing for a Variety or Music Program	Tracey Takes On...	Nominated
2008	Primetime Emmy Awards	Outstanding Comedy Series	30 Rock	Won
2009	Primetime Emmy Awards	Outstanding Comedy Series	30 Rock	Won
2010	Primetime Emmy Awards	Outstanding Directing for a Comedy Series	30 Rock	Nominated

== Selected directing credits ==
- The Days and Nights of Molly Dodd (1988–1991 TV series)
- A Few Good Men (1989 Broadway play)
- Me and Veronica (1992)
- Tracey Ullman Takes on New York (1993 TV movie)
- Law & Order (1991–2006 TV series)
- Veronica's Video (1997 TV movie)
- Tracey Takes On... (1997–1998)
- The Deal (1998 short)
- Cosby (1998–2000 TV series)
- Advice from a Caterpillar (1999)
- The West Wing (2000 TV series)
- Chestnut Hill (2001 TV movie)
- 100 Centre Street (2001-2002 TV series, directed episodes S02E03, S02E08, S02E11, and S02E16)
- Ed (2002–2003 TV series)
- Law & Order: Criminal Intent (2002–2003 TV series)
- Oldest Living Confederate Widow Tells All (2003 Broadway play)
- George Lopez (2004 TV series)
- Hope & Faith (2004–2006 TV series)
- Lennon (2005 Broadway musical)
- 30 Rock (2006–2013 TV series)
- Rescue Me (2007 TV series)
- The Incredible Burt Wonderstone (2013)
- Browsers (2013 TV movie)
- 2 Broke Girls (2013–2017 TV series)
- Sober Companion (2014 TV movie)
- Scary Shit (2014 TV movie)
- Mission Control (2014 TV movie)
- Crazy Ex-Girlfriend (2015 TV series)
- The Kicker (2016 TV movie)
- Young Sheldon (2017 TV series)
- LA to Vegas (2018 TV series)
- Instinct (2018 TV series)
- All About the Washingtons (2018 TV series)
- The Cool Kids (2018 TV series)
- New Amsterdam (2018 TV series)
- I Mom So Hard (2019 TV movie)
- The Conners (2020 TV series)
- Our (Almost Completely True) Love Story (2021)
- Only Murders in the Building (2021 TV series)
- The Bitch Who Stole Christmas (2021 TV movie)
- A Break in the Brain (2025)
- The Fall and Rise of Reggie Dinkins (2025 TV series, directed S01E08 "The Loyalty Swamp")

== Selected producing credits ==
- The Days and Nights of Molly Dodd (1988–1991)
- Deadline (2000–2001)
- 30 Rock (2006–2010)

== Selected acting credits ==
- The People Next Door (1970) as Sandy Hoffman
- Homer (1970) as Homer Edwards
- Rip-Off (1971) as Michael
- Squirm (1976) as Mick
- Cruising (1980) as Ted Bailey
- He Knows You're Alone (1980) as Marvin Travis
