= Ralph Endersby =

Canadian actor and producer (born 1950)

- Born: 26 June 1950 (age 75); Toronto, Ontario, Canada
- Occupations: actor, film producer

Ralph Endersby (born 26 June 1950) is a Canadian actor and producer. He began his acting career in his youth, seen internationally on the 1960s television series The Forest Rangers.

Endersby was one of many CBC television vets to appear in Jim Henson's 1969 experimental drama The Cube, as the guitarist whose band practice unnerves the protagonist. A portion of the guitarist's song lyrics were later quoted in the book It's Not Easy Being Green.

Endersby's other acting credits included roles in a few 70s Canadian features, including Homer, Rip-Off, and Sunday in the Country. In recent years, Endersby has switched to writing and directing, and also produced the TV movie The Challengers.

== Filmography ==
- 1963-1966: The Forest Rangers, as Junior Ranger Leader Chub Stanley (TV series)
- 1969: My Side of the Mountain (film)
- 1969: The Cube
- 1970: Homer (film)
- 1970-1971: Adventures in Rainbow Country (guest appearance, TV series)
- 1971: Rip-Off (film)
- 1974: Sunday in the Country (film)
- 1976: For the Record: A Nest of Shadows (TV film)
- 1990: The Challengers (producer, CBC TV movie)
