= Pat McDonagh (fashion designer) =

British fashion designer

Patricia (Pat) McDonagh (17 March 1934 – 31 May 2014) was a British fashion designer who became an important figure in Canadian fashion. She promoted the then-unknown model Twiggy and she designed costumes for The Beatles. McDonagh also designed costumes for Diana Rigg, as Emma Peel, in The Avengers.

== Early life ==
McDonagh was born in Harpurhey, Manchester, England on St. Patrick's Day 17 March 1934, the eldest of four children in a family of Irish origins. Her mother instilled a strong perfectionist tendency into her children. McDonagh later said "[she] never praised us". She was educated at Loreto Convent, Moss Side, Manchester, followed by a spell at the University of Manchester. She also studied at the Sorbonne in Paris.

She worked as a model in London and Paris in the late 1950s, on television and in print, and in the fashion houses of Jacques Helm and Maggy Rouff. Following her marriage to David Main in 1960, and the birth of her first two children, McDonagh opened boutiques in Horwich and Worsley, Lancashire.

== Canada ==
McDonagh moved to Canada in 1966 after David got a job with the Canadian Broadcasting Corporation (CBC). She described it as "like landing in the dark ages," at least as far as fashion went. Styles were old-fashioned, and materials were difficult to obtain due to poor domestic production and high import taxes. She opened her first shop, known as The Establishment, in Bloor Street in downtown Toronto and began designing clothes. She was particularly known for creating "glamorous garments showcasing innovation in textile techniques" and her glamorous evening wear found favour with the social elite of Toronto's fund-raising circuit. Her creations were worn by Cher and Ella Fitzgerald. She went on to open a factory, the product of which was known as the Re-Establishment range, and to sell her clothes across Canada and the United States, including in Bloomingdale's, Bonwit Teller and Henri Bendel in New York. Among the styles she was said to have introduced to North America were minidresses, maxi-coats, bell-bottoms and the jumpsuit.

She was credited with bringing the Mod look to Canada. In 1966 she took the unknown model Twiggy, who exemplified the androgynous Mod style in women's fashion, to a meeting with the fashion editor of the Canadian newspaper The Star, but the editor did not believe that Twiggy was a model as she was too thin and had a haircut and beret typical in Canada of the mentally disabled. Before she was well known, Twiggy had modelled for McDonagh in England and helped out in the stockroom.

In 1999 McDonagh co-founded the Fashion Design Council of Canada, the former owners and producers of Toronto Fashion Week. They honoured her with a lifetime achievement award in 2003.

== Designs ==
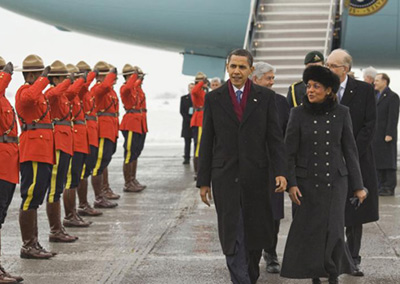
Governor General Michaëlle Jean of Canada wearing a coat by Pat McDonagh when greeting Barack Obama. The coat become known as the "Mrs Obama Coat".

In England, McDonagh designed costumes for Diana Rigg as Emma Peel in The Avengers for whom she created leatherwear and python-buckled coats which she called "a very sophisticated, slightly fanciful take on what was happening in the swinging London club scene of the time".

In Canada, she saw herself as exporting the "English look" abroad. She was inspired by the styles of the 1930s and 40s. One design, which became widely known simply as "the red dress," won her The New York Times award for design excellence in 1982.

She designed the coat worn by Governor General Michaëlle Jean during Barack Obama's 2009 visit to Canada. The coat thereafter became known as the "Mrs. Obama coat" and McDonagh received regular requests from customers wishing to buy it.

Near the end of her life, she spoke of a simple dress worn by the central character in the 1927 film Metropolis which had inspired her. She said she had used the same basic shape in every one of her collections in one form or another.

Throughout her career she never changed her personal style, claiming as a Pisces to be averse to change, and her black bob hairstyle eventually became part of her personal brand and even part of her company logo.

== Personal life ==
McDonagh married the television director David Main (then working for Granada Television) in 1960, but they eventually divorced. The couple had three children, Louisa, Dominic, and Kate. A slightly eccentric character, McDonagh was sometimes seen about Toronto with a parrot perched on her shoulder. She was a friend of the homeless and prone to spontaneous acts of generosity. She supported HIV and AIDS charities. McDonagh, who had cancer, died in Toronto on 31 May 2014.
