= Toronto Fashion Week =

Annual fashion show

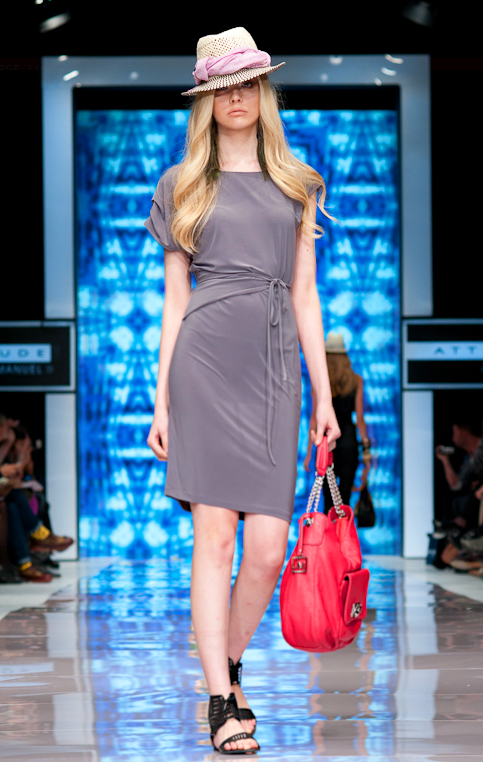
- Model Bryanna Elkins walks the runway modeling fashions by Jay Manuel at Toronto Fashion Week, September 2011.
- Genre: Clothing and fashion exhibitions
- Frequency: Bi-annually
- Location: Toronto
- Country: Canada
- Inaugurated: 1999
- Founder: Robin Kay

Toronto Fashion Week (TFW), held in February (for fall/winter collections) and September (for spring/summer collections) of each year, is a semi-annual event celebrating fashion, arts and culture where Canadian and international fashion collections are shown to buyers, the press, and the general public. It is the largest fashion week held in Canada and the second largest fashion week in North America, following the well known New York Fashion Week.

The event is currently held within Toronto's exclusive luxury retail and brand neighbourhood, Yorkville, along Hazelton Avenue and Yorkville Avenue.

Toronto Fashion Week draws considerable media attention, nationally and internationally. In 2012, it attracted 40,000 guests over 5 days, showcased over 100 designers, and left over 877 million media impressions worldwide. It has helped propel Canadian designers and fashion brands, such as Joe Fresh, to international recognition.

== Origin ==
Toronto Fashion Week was founded in 1999 by the Fashion Design Council of Canada under designers Robin Kay and Pat McDonagh. The goal for the event was to prepare Canadian designers for the international stage, bringing together media, industry, buyers and consumers to give Toronto international recognition. The City of Toronto government and Holt Renfrew were initial sponsors.

The event was small initially. Its first show was held at the Windsor Arms Hotel and showcased six designers and attracted approximately 200 audience members.

== Ownership history ==
Between 1999 and 2012, Toronto Fashion Week was owned by Robin Kay and the Fashion Design Council of Canada. Its first title sponsor was Beauty by L'Oréal Paris in 2002; from 2002 to 2008, the event was thus called L'Oréal Fashion Week. Its title changed to LG Fashion Week in 2008, after LG (Life's Good) Electronics Canada became the event's top sponsor, in conjunction with L'Oréal. In early 2012, the event was again renamed to World MasterCard Fashion Week after taking on World MasterCard as a new title sponsor.

On August 8, 2012, it was reported that Robin Kay and the Fashion Design Council of Canada sold the Toronto Fashion Week brand to IMG, the same organisation responsible for operating New York Fashion Week. In February 2016, after World MasterCard and L'Oréal withdrew as sponsors, the event's title returned to Toronto Fashion Week.

On July 7, 2016, IMG, citing lack of local commercial funding, announced it was closing down Toronto Fashion Week, prompting national media speculation about the demise of the event reflecting global changes in the fashion industry. In December 2016, Peter Freed announced the purchase of Toronto Fashion Week from IMG. Freed, President of Freed Developments, spearheaded the ownership group, composed of several of the country's top executives in real estate, media and finance. The founding sponsors, aside from Freed Developments, included The Hazelton Hotel, Hill & Gertner Capital Corporation and Yorkville Village. Under the new ownership, Toronto Fashion Week has been revived, although the event has been contracted from a bi-annual 7-day event to a bi-annual 3-day event.

== Other notable events ==
=== 2004 ===
Italian fashion label Missoni celebrated its 50-year anniversary by showcasing a retrospective at the event. Toronto was chosen to commemorate a partnership with Milan and to endorse trade relations in the area of fashion, after the two cities signed a formal international alliance agreement to strengthen economic and cultural links in 2003.

=== 2011 ===
American reality television show America's Next Top Model featured Toronto Fashion Week after show creator Tyra Banks sent models to the event for the Mercedes-Benz Start Up Challenge, a national fashion competition launched by Mercedes-Benz and IMG, then owner of Toronto Fashion Week, to discover Canada's newest design talent.

America's Next Top Model also promoted the line 'Attitude', which had been launched at Toronto Fashion Week in February 2011 by Jay Manuel, Creative Director of America's Next Top Model and host of Canada's Next Top Model, on behalf of Sears Canada.

=== 2017 ===
Model Rachel Romu attracted national media attention when she became the first model to walk the Toronto Fashion Week runway with a mobility aid, presenting designer Hayley Elsaesser's fashion collection while using a cane.

== Management ==
As of 2020, Carolyn Quinn was TFW's Executive Director. Suzanne Cohon is currently Toronto Fashion Week's Fashion, Arts and Cultural Ambassador.

== See also ==
- Fashion Week
- Runway fashion
- Fashion show
- List of fashion events
- Toronto
