= Fashion Design Council of Canada =

The Fashion Design Council of Canada (FDCC) is a non-government, not-for-profit organization co-founded in 1999 by Pat McDonagh and Robin Kay. Their mission is to showcase Canadian fashion design nationally and internationally as well as introducing foreign designers to local Canadian markets. The FDCC aims to connect "designers, media, buyers, sponsors, and industry."

The current president of the FDCC is one of the founders Robin Kay. Joe Mimran, fashion designer best known for creating Club Monaco and Joe Fresh, is the current chairman of FDCC's board of directors. The FDCC's head office is currently located in Toronto, Ontario, Canada.

== Fashion week acquisition by IMG ==
In August 2012, the Fashion Design Council of Canada announced that they had sold Toronto's World MasterCard Fashion Week to the global media business IMG. In a press release at the time, Robin Kay said, "I am confident that the time is right for IMG to take World MasterCard Fashion Week to the next level." It was seen as a major coup for the FDCC and Robin Kay whose hard work to build Toronto Fashion Week as a major player in the global fashion calendar was recognised by IMG. As a result of the change of ownership, Robin Kay stepped down from her position as Toronto Fashion Week executive director. However, in the subsequent years, Toronto Fashion Week has waned both in public support and private sponsorship.
