= Mavor Moore =

Canadian actor and writer

Mavor Moore CC OBC
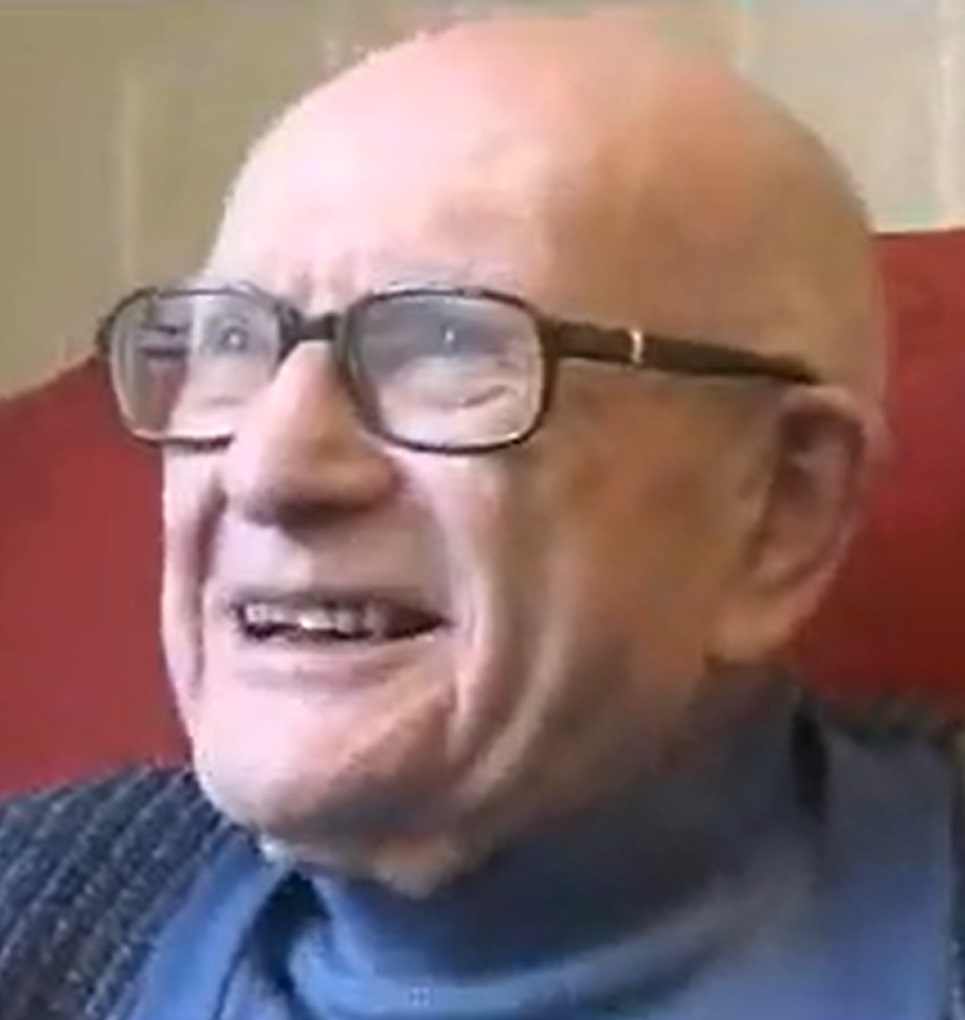
- Moore circa 2002
- Born: James Mavor Moore; March 8, 1919; Toronto, Ontario, Canada
- Died: December 18, 2006 (aged 87); Victoria, British Columbia, Canada
- Occupations: Writer; producer; actor
- Spouses: Darwina Faessler (m. 1943; div. 1962); Phyllis Grosskurth (m. 1968; div. 1978); Alexandra Browning (m. 1980)
- Children: 5, including Tedde and Charlotte Moore
- Relatives: Noah Shebib (grandson); James Watt Mavor (uncle); Dora Mavor Moore (mother); James Mavor (grandfather)
- Awards: Governor General's Performing Arts Award

James Mavor Moore CC OBC (March 8, 1919 – December 18, 2006) was a Canadian writer, producer, actor, public servant, critic, and educator. He notably appeared as Nero Wolfe in the CBC radio production in 1982.

== Life and work ==
Moore was born in Toronto, Ontario, to Francis John Moore, an Anglican theologian, and Dora Mavor Moore, who helped establish Canadian professional theatre in the 1930s and 1940s. His mother was born in Glasgow, the daughter of economist James Mavor.

Moore began acting at the age of six on the Hart House Stage, and continued throughout his high school career at the University of Toronto Schools. Subsequently, he took up radio acting to pay his way through college. He received a BA degree from the University of Toronto in 1941. Moore served in the Canadian military as an Intelligence officer during World War II. Following the War, he was employed by CBC Radio, becoming its producer for its International Service (based in Montreal). He transferred to CBC Television in 1950, serving as its first chief producer.

He was among the pioneers of Canadian television in the 1950s, and was the creator of the CBC National News, later known as The National. Moore selected the program's first regular newsreader, Larry Henderson.

Moore and his mother worked together to found the New Play Society, for which he served as producer/director of Spring Thaw, the society's annual comedy revue (1948-1965). From 1958, Moore acted and directed at the Crest Theatre where he directed his own play The Ottawa Man in 1958. He portrayed King Lear in the 1960 production at Crest. He appeared in other productions at Crest, including Witness for the Prosecution and Caesar and Cleopatra and directed a production of Macbeth as well as several productions of Spring Thaw.

From 1970 to 1984, he taught theatre history as a professor at York University, and chaired its theatre department (1975-1976). He was named to the Canada Council in 1974, and was the first artist to chair the council (1979-1983). He received three Peabody Awards for his radio documentaries produced on behalf of the United Nations.

Moore was the founding chair of the British Columbia Arts Council (1996-1998). He sat on the first Board of Governors of the Stratford Festival. He was the founding chair of the Canadian Theatre Centre, the Guild of Canadian Playwrights, and was a founding director of the Charlottetown Festival.

In 1973, Moore was made an Officer of the Order of Canada and was promoted to Companion in 1988. In 1999, he was appointed to the Order of British Columbia. He received the Governor General's Performing Arts Award, Canada's highest honour in the performing arts, in November 1999. He received a total of seven honorary degrees during his lifetime.

== Publications and notable works ==
Moore is well known for his contributions to drama, having created more than 100 plays, documentaries, musicals, and librettos for stage, radio and television.

- Reinventing Myself (1994), Moore's autobiography
- Sunshine Town (1954), a musical retelling of the Stephen Leacock biography
- The Ottawa Man (1958), a musical drama
- Louis Riel (1967), an opera composed by Harry Somers for which Moore wrote the libretto
- Johnny Belinda, musical play by Mavor Moore and John Fenwick, Charlottetown Festival, 1968
- Belinda, CBC Television adaptation of the musical, telecast March 9, 1977
- Fauntleroy (1980)

== Other artistic activities ==
He wrote a theatre critic section for the Toronto Telegram newspaper (1958-1960), and was arts critic for the Maclean's magazine (1968-1969).

== Family ==
Moore married Darwina Faessler in 1943. They had four daughters, including Charlotte Moore and Tedde Moore, both Dora Mavor Moore Award winners. His second marriage, in 1968, was to Phyllis Grosskurth, ending in divorce in 1978. In 1980, he married opera singer Alexandra Browning and welcomed his fifth daughter, Jessica Moore. He died in 2006, aged 87, after several years of ill health.

His grandson is actor and music producer Noah James Shebib, known as 40.

== Filmography ==
Year	Title	Role	Notes
1979	City on Fire	John O'Brien	
1979	Fish Hawk	Joke Bryan	
1981	Tales of the Klondike		Episode The Unexpected
1981	Scanners	Trevellyan	
1981	Dirty Tricks	Mr. Underhill	
1981	Heavy Metal	Elder	(segment "Taarna"), Voice
1981	Threshold	Ethics Committee Chairman	
1981	A Choice of Two		
1986	Hot Money	Bartholomew	
1987	Malone	Hausmann	
