= James Watt Mavor =

American biologist (1883–1963)

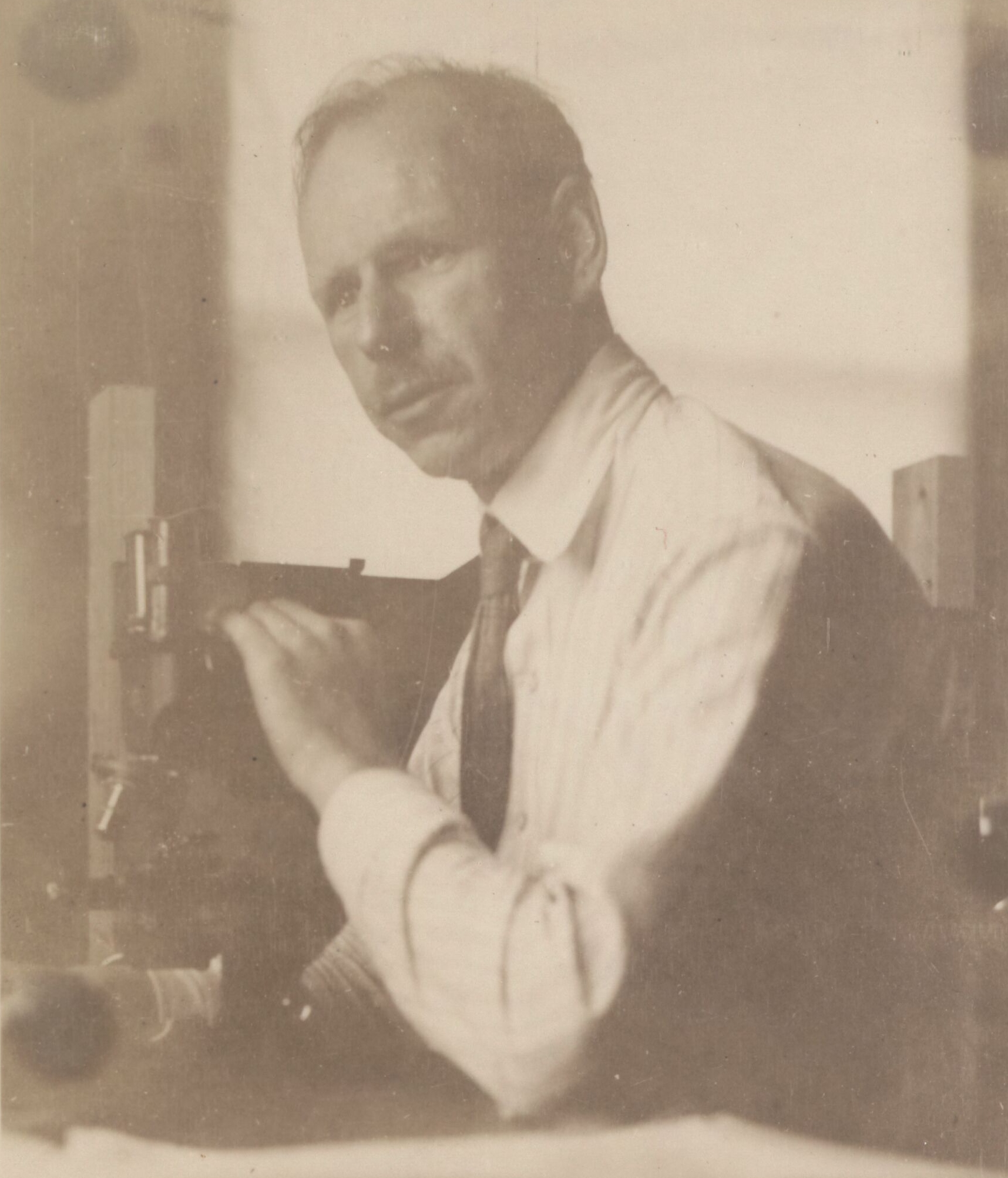
- Mavor in 1920
- Born: December 13, 1883; Scotland
- Died: March 16, 1963 (aged 79); Winter Park, Florida, U.S.
- Occupation: Biologist
- Spouses: Dorothy Jessup (m. 1921, divorced); Anna Camilla Hoyt
- Children: 2
- Relatives: Noah Shebib (great-grandnephew); Charlotte Moore (grandniece); Tedde Moore (grandniece); Mavor Moore (nephew); Dora Mavor Moore (sister); James Mavor (father)

James Watt Mavor (13 December 1883 – 16 March 1963) was an American biologist who studied the effects of X-ray radiation on living cells. He served as a professor of biology at Union College, Schenectady. He also worked at the Marine Biological Laboratory at Woods Hole, Massachusetts. His son, James Watt Mayor Jr. (1923–2006), also worked at Woods Hole as an oceanographic engineer and was involved in developing the Alvin submarine.

== Life and work ==
Mavor was born in Glasgow, Scotland, the son of James Mavor (1854–1925) who moved to Canada to take a position at the University of Toronto as a professor of political economy. Mavor grew up in Toronto but went to study at Trinity College, Cambridge, and received an AB in 1905. His father wanted him to go into business but he took an interest in mathematics and later studied biology. He worked as a lecturer at King's College, Nova Scotia (1906–7), teaching science. He then joined Harvard University as a Thayer Scholar and then Gibbs Scholar (1908–10). He received his master's degree in 1910 and became an instructor in zoology at Syracuse University. He joined Harvard in 1911 and spent time studying protozoa in Munich under Richard Hertwig and then at St. Andrews Biological Station, New Brunswick (1912). He returned to Harvard, teaching and working on his dissertation on myxosporidia of fish. He received a doctorate in 1913 and became an instructor at the University of Wisconsin. In 1916 he joined Union College, Schenectady and by 1921 he was an associate professor.

In 1920 he became interested in the effects of X-rays on Drosophila. This research was sponsored by General Electric and conducted at their laboratories. He conducted dose-response experiments initially in Drosophila melanogaster and later in the sea urchin Arbacia punctulata. He studied non-disjunction of the chromosomes as the key effect but also crossing-over. He also examined the effects on gametes and the control of sex of offspring. This was later studied by H. J. Muller but Mavor did not communicate with other geneticists of the period and he appeared to have some bitterness towards T. H. Morgan, possibly because he had delayed publication of his work in the Journal of Experimental Zoology. By 1925 he shifted work back to marine biology and fish parasitology. As a teacher, his classes were noted as being somewhat dull. He became head of the department in 1924. In 1936 he published a textbook of biology which went into many edition, a sixth being published posthumously in 1966. It was also made into an abridged version in 1949. He was interested in the future of humanity and wrote about nature, evolution, religion and governance. He became an emeritus professor in 1949.
