= Dora Mavor Moore =

British actress (1888–1979)

- Born: Dora Mavor; 8 April 1888; Glasgow, Scotland
- Died: 15 May 1979 (aged 91); Toronto, Ontario, Canada
- Other name: Dora Mavor
- Occupations: Actress; director; teacher
- Spouse: Francis Moore (m. 1915; sep. 1928)
- Children: 3, including Mavor Moore
- Relatives: Noah Shebib (great-grandson); Tedde Moore (granddaughter); Charlotte Moore (granddaughter); James Watt Mavor (brother); James Mavor (father)

Dora Mavor Moore, OC (née Mavor; 8 April 1888 – 15 May 1979) was a Scottish actress, teacher and director who was a pioneer of Canadian theatre.

== Life and work ==
Born Dora Mavor in Glasgow, Scotland, she moved with her family to Toronto, Ontario, Canada in 1894, when her father, James Mavor (1854-1925), became a professor of political economy at the University of Toronto. She was the first Canadian student ever to be accepted at London's Royal Academy of Dramatic Art and graduated in 1912.

In 1915, she married Francis Moore, an Army chaplain. The couple separated in 1928. They had three sons: Francis Wilfrid Mavor, James Mavor Moore, and Peter Mavor.

In 1938, she helped found an amateur theater group called the Village Players which performed Shakespeare plays in high schools of Ontario. After World War II, in 1946, with her son Mavor, she helped found the New Play Society which was the first professional theatre company in Toronto founded after the war. In 1947, the company presented its first Canadian play, Lister Sinclair's The Man in the Blue Moon. The Society also assisted in creating the Stratford Shakespearean Festival of Canada. As well she helped to bring Tyrone Guthrie, the Tony Award-winning British theatrical director, to Canada.

In 1970, she was made an Officer of the Order of Canada "for her contributions to theatre in Canada". As a recipient of the Order of Canada she received the Canadian version of the Queen Elizabeth II Silver Jubilee Medal in 1977.

Her granddaughters are actresses Charlotte Moore and Tedde Moore, and her great-grandson is actor and music producer Noah "40" Shebib.

== Legacy ==
- Dora Mavor Moore Award
