= James Mavor =

Scottish-Canadian economist (1854–1925)

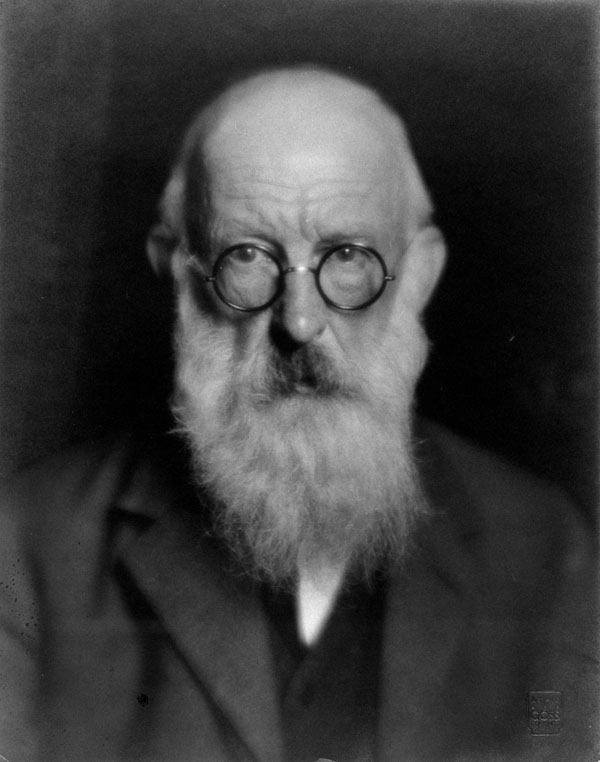
- Born: December 8, 1854; Stranraer, Scotland
- Died: October 31, 1925 (aged 70); Glasgow, Scotland
- Education: Glasgow University
- Occupation: Economist
- Spouse: Christina Jane Gordon Balfour (m. 1883)
- Children: 3, including James Watt and Dora Mavor Moore
- Relatives: Mavor Moore (grandson); Tedde Moore (great-granddaughter); Charlotte Moore (great-granddaughter); Noah Shebib (great-great grandson)

James Mavor (December 8, 1854 – October 31, 1925) was a Scottish-Canadian economist. He served as a Professor of Political Economy of the University of Toronto from 1892 to 1923. His influence upon Canadian economic thought is traced to as late as the 1970s. He played a key role in resettling Doukhobor religious dissidents from the Russian Empire to Canada. He was also a noted arts promoter.

== Life and career ==
Mavor was born in Stranraer, Scotland, to James Mavor, a Free Church of Scotland minister and teacher, and his wife, Mary Ann Taylor Bridie. He studied in Glasgow University. After that he taught for some time in a Glasgow college and read special courses in Glasgow University and Edinburgh University. He was also an editor for Scottish Art Review. He also became active in the Socialist League, chairing its Scottish district.

In 1892, upon the recommendation of University of Toronto Professor William Ashley who was leaving for Harvard University, he took Ashley's chair of Political Economy and Constitutional History, moving to Toronto with his family (including daughter Dora who would later become a major figure in Canada's theatre). After 1892, he spent most of his life in Toronto, leaving only for short trips.

In 1893, James Mavor was a founding member of the Toronto Chapter of the Alpha Delta Phi Literary Society.

At the start, he caused turmoil when he stated Canada could not serve as the only source of wheat for the British Empire as general ideology of the Empire observed it. To avoid further misunderstanding, he took the economy of Russia as his major scientific specialization. As a professor he also researched the economies of Canada, China, Korea, and Japan.

In 1898 through 1899, he became a key figure in the Doukhobor immigration to Canada. His correspondent at the time was notable Russian scientist and major Anarchist ideologist Kropotkin, at that time living in the UK, who proposed that Doukhobor peasantry, numbering several thousand people, be settled in Canada. Through several years that followed, he took a keen interest in the Doukhobor cause, siding with them in cases of conflict with Canadian authorities. Kropotkin warmly regarded Mavor as a friend and later recalled that Mavor was "a living encyclopedia of Canadian economics."

As an arts activist, Mavor helped organize several Canadian art venues, such as the Art Gallery of Ontario and the Royal Ontario Museum.

He published articles and statistics for the Canadian government regarding immigration, wheat production, and workers' healthcare compensation. In 1914, he published the first edition of his magnum opus, An Economic History of Russia, in two volumes. This publication earned him membership in the Royal Society of Canada.

He also was the founding and guiding mind of the Hart House Chess Club, now the longest active chess club in Canada.

After over 30 years of teaching economy, he became professor emeritus and retired in 1923.

After he left, the University of Toronto for some time discontinued the tradition of extensive Russian studies he and William Ashley founded.

== Death ==
Mavor died at the age of 71 in Glasgow, Scotland, during a trip to visit relatives.

Mavor and his wife, Christina Jane Gordon Balfour, had three children: Dora Mavor Moore, who co-founded the Stratford Festival, Brigadier-General Wilfrid Mavor, C.B.E., M.C., E.D., a celebrated Canadian soldier, and James Watt Mavor, a Professor of Biology, Union College, Schenectady.

His grandson is actor Mavor Moore, his great-grandson is Norman Armour actor, director, producer, and the co-founder of PuSh, his great-granddaughters are actresses Charlotte Moore and Tedde Moore, and his great-great-grandson is actor and music producer Noah "40" Shebib.

== Legacy ==
- In honour of James Mavor, George Bernard Shaw named one of the main characters of his play Candida (1898), the "Rev. James Mavor Morell".

== Bibliography ==
- An Economic History of Russia (London 1914; in 2 Volumes). Russell & Russell, 1914, reissued 1925, 1965. this book at в google
- My Windows on the Street of the World (London, 1923; Autobiography). 2 volumes, Toronto and London: J. M. Dent & Sons, New York: E. P. Dutton, 1923. Includes chapters about William Morris, Leo Tolstoy, Peter Kropotkin, Peter Verigin. this book at google
- Niagara in Politics: A Critical Account of the Ontario Hydroelectric Commission (New York, 1925). E. P. Dutton & Company, 1925. 255 pages.
- The Russian Revolution. George Allen & Unwin, 1928. 470 pages.
- Applied Economics a Practical Exposition of the Science of Business. Original issued in series: Modern business. Canadian edition; v. 1. Alexander Hamilton Institute 1914 ISBN 0-665-77177-0
- Hand-book of Canada. Publication Committee of the Local Executive of the British Association for the Advancement of Science, 1980. (Canada Description and travel 1868—1900) ISBN 0-665-02833-4
- Government Telephones: The Experience of Manitoba, Canada. Moffat, Yard & Co., 1916. 176 страниц.

== Sources ==
- Dictionary of Canadian Biography: Volume XV, 1921—1930 (eds. Réal Bélanger, Ramsay Cook). University of Toronto Press, Canada, 2005; ISBN 0-8020-9087-7

== See also ==
=== Archives ===
There is a James Mavor fonds at Library and Archives Canada. The archival reference number is R7458.
