= Ottawa Fashion Week =

Ottawa Fashion Week is a nonprofit event which takes place in Ottawa, Ontario, Canada biannually, in February and September. OFW is a platform for local and international designers to showcase their fashion creations, both to the citizens of Ottawa and to visitors to the Canada's capital city from around the world. Since its beginnings in 2003, OFW has grown each year, and includes major fashion productions. It is a business opportunity for members of the fashion and art industry as well as a venue for career growth for designers and artists.

The event ended After 11 seasons, Ottawa Fashion Week pulled the plug on the semi-annual showcase of designers. in 2014.

In 2024 a new owner Kataryn Tataryn is running the events and shows under the name Fashion Week Ottawa with the original owners blessing.

== Venue ==
In 2012 the venue for the events was the Ottawa Convention Centre, which is a newly built glass and steel building of architectural interest, a landmark in the city's landscape, situated by the banks of the Rideau Canal. The main event was held in the spacious Canada Hall and the pre-function space overlooking the canal. In 2013 and 2014 the event was held at the Casino Lac Leamy in nearby Gatineau, Quebec.

In 2024 Kataryn revived the show and the venue for the events was The Art Court in Ottawa, The Arts Court is a vibrant cultural hub where the creative community gathers to use state-of-the-art spaces while collaborating with Ottawa’s leading artists and multi-disciplinary arts organizations.

== Well-known labels ==
Some well-known labels that have showcased at Ottawa Fashion Week include Rudsak, House Tataryn, Vibe the People, Jessica Biffi, Adrian Wu, Jeanne Beker, Simon Ekrelius, Joseph Ribkoff, and Elene Hinke.
