= Gema Zamprogna =

Canadian actress (born 1976)

- Born: 24 May 1976 (age 49); Hamilton, Ontario, Canada
- Occupation: Actress
- Years active: 1988–2008
- Spouse: Daniel Boich (m. 2003)
- Children: 3

Gema Zamprogna (born 24 May 1976) is a Canadian actress. She is best known for her role as Felicity King on Road to Avonlea and Mackie "Mac" Daniels in The Challengers.

== Personal life ==
Gema Zamprogna was born 24 May 1976, in Hamilton, Ontario. Her parents are professional dancers Lou and Pauline Zamprogna (1946-2013). She has two younger siblings, twins Dominic and Amanda.

She attended Hillfield Strathallan College where she had an arts scholarship.

She later attended Queen's University, where she graduated in 2000 with a Bachelor of Arts degree in Drama and is one of the founding members of Toronto's Theatrefront drama group.

She married Daniel Boich on 25 October 2003, and together they have three children; Daniella (b. November 2004), Sam (b. 8 May 2006) and Luka.

Zamprogna established Studio Technique Pilates in Burlington, Ontario in 2003. In 2011, she moved her family to Grimsby and opened Grimsby Pilates, in addition to teaching and choreographing musical productions at The Dance Centre and the Theatre Aquarius Performing Arts Programme.

In 2017, Zamprogna and her sister opened Zamprogna Arts in Hamilton, Ontario.

== Filmography ==
Film and television
Year	Title	Role	Notes
1988	My Secret Identity		Episode: "Forbidden Ground"
1989	The Challengers	Mac Daniels	TV film
1989	Friday the 13th	Girl #1	Episode: "The Playhouse"
1990	War of the Worlds	Sam Fisher	Episode: "Candle in the Night"
1990	In Defense of a Married Man	Amanda Simmons	TV film
1990–1996	Road to Avonlea	Felicity King	Main role
1991	The Soulmates in The Gift of Light	Ella (voice)	TV film
1992	By Way of the Stars	Ursula von Knabig	TV mini-series
1992	Forever Knight	Katherine	Episode: "Last Act"
1998	An Avonlea Christmas	Felicity Pike	TV film
1999	Pirates of Silicon Valley	Arlene	TV film
1999	Dear America: So Far from Home	Annie Clark	TV film
1999	Johnny	Alice	
2000	Twice in a Lifetime	Young Sarah Carlyle	Episode: "Take Two"
2001	Jewel	Sarah	TV film
2002	Avenging Angelo	Allison	
2003	Sue Thomas: F.B.Eye	Gwen Stack	Episode: "The Fugitive"
2004	ReGenesis	Female Student #1	Episode: "Faint Hope"
2008	Murdoch Mysteries	Cecile Braxton	Episode: "'Til Death Do Us Part"

== Awards and nominations ==
Year	Award	Category	Title of work	Result
1991	Young Artist Award	Best Young Actress Co-starring in an Off-Primetime Series	Road to Avonlea	Nominated
1992	Gemini Award	Best Performance by an Actress in a Supporting Role	Road to Avonlea	Nominated
1993	Young Artist Award	Best Young Actress Co-starring in a Cable Series	Road to Avonlea	Nominated
1995	Gemini Award	Best Performance by an Actress in a Supporting Role	Road to Avonlea (for episode #5.9: "Thursday's Child")	Nominated
1997	Gemini Award	Best Performance by an Actress in a Continuing Leading Dramatic Role	Road to Avonlea (for episode #7.11: "Return to Me")	Nominated
