= Rip-Off (film) =

1971 film directed by Donald Shebib

- Film poster
- Directed by: Donald Shebib
- Written by: William Fruet
- Produced by: Bennett Fode
- Starring: Don Scardino; Ralph Endersby; Mike Kukulewich; Peter Gross; Sue Helen Petrie; Hugh Webster
- Cinematography: Richard Leiterman
- Edited by: Donald Shebib; Tony Lower
- Music by: Gene Martynec; Murray McLauchlan
- Production company: Phoenix Film Productions Ltd.
- Distributed by: Alliance Releasing
- Release date: 30 September 1971 (Canada)
- Running time: 88 minutes
- Country: Canada
- Language: English

Rip-Off: Trying to Find Your Own Thing (better known simply as Rip-Off; French: Rêver en couleur; U.S.: Virgin Territory) is a 1971 Canadian slice of life teen comedy film directed and co-edited by Don (Donald) Shebib, written by William Fruet, and produced by Bennett Fode, about the misadventures of four high school friends in their graduating year who make valiant but unsuccessful attempts to impress their school friends, especially the girls, trying filmmaking, forming a rock band, and starting a commune on a piece of land inherited by Michael (Don Scardino). The film features a score by Gene Martynec and Murray McLauchlan.

== Synopsis ==
Four seniors at a large Toronto high school talk about what they are going to do next summer and beyond, not wanting to "waste" it like they did the year before. Mike is being pressured by his parents to go to university following graduation from high school, although Mike himself is unsure if that is what he wants to do. They try their hand at filmmaking, with mixed results. They talk about touring with their band, Arctic Madness, but eventually pack it in as they are not very good. They try setting up a commune near Timmins on a five-hundred-acre parcel of wilderness property which Mike has inherited for about four days. As the end of the school year approaches, their best ideas having been tried and rejected, the four come to a realization of what their future together actually holds.

== Cast ==
- Don Scardino as Michael ("Dunky")
- Ralph Endersby as Steve
- Mike Kukulewich as Cooley
- Peter Gross as Richie
- Susan Petrie as Sue (credited as Sue Helen Petrie)
- Hugh Webster as Mr. Dunken
- Maxine Miller as Mrs. Dunken
- Alma Matsh as Grandma
- Tedde Moore as Nancy
- August Schellenberg as Indian

In addition, the cast includes Guy Sanvido, Petunia Cameron-Swayze, Buddy Sault, Ann Lantuch, Andy Melzer, Dan Evered, Clara Sarkozi, Ed McNamara, Diane Dewey, Linda Houston, Susan Conway, Carman Gallo, and David Yorston. This was the first film appearance for three of the leads, Mike Kukulewich, Peter Gross, and Susan Petrie.

== Themes ==
Focusing on the trip to the country, Ralph Lucas considers disillusionment to be the "overriding theme" as, "somewhat predictably, in the end the young people are dismayed to discover they are not as different as they would like to be." Geoff Pevere also focuses on that aspect of the story, the characters leaving the city for the "vast landscape, only to inevitably collide with their own delusions". John Hofsess saw Rip-Off as part of a larger trend in which the directors of teen movies shifted focus:

By the time one reaches The Panic in Needle Park, Dusty and Sweets McGee, Bless the Beasts and Children, and, in particular, Don Shebib's Rip-Off, Clarke Mackey's The Only Thing You Know, and Peter Watkins' Punishment Park, it is clear that directors recognize that youth culture has curdled. For years everything shoddy, hypocritical and evil has been blamed on other (older) people. Now it's youth's turn to accept responsibility for the dreary mess of its own subculture.

== Production ==
=== Background and writing ===
Director Donald Shebib recounted in a 2013 interview how the distributor of his first feature, Goin' Down the Road, "wanted to make a film about teenagers, so I just sat down and started to write it. It was very rushed."

The film's working title was Mike and Sue. In an interview which took place prior to the release of his later film, Between Friends, Shebib was asked if he was consciously posing "socially-loaded questions", Shebib answered: "Partially, yeah. Rip-Off was one case where it was stronger." In the same interview, Shebib remarked: "Bill Fruet writes dreadful women", and that he had to "fight" with him to make Sue more "sensitive".

=== Filming ===
Wyndham Wise says the film was made on a strict budget with a "skeleton crew" of nine. Cinematographer Richard Leiterman said the film was a little over budget, but stayed on schedule. Leiterman originally made documentary films. He made the switch to dramatic films when he shot Shebib's previous film, the seminal Goin' Down the Road; dramatic films were now his "primary professional domain", though since both he and Shebib had documentary backgrounds, this was reflected in how their first two feature films were made, more so with Goin' Down the Road than Rip-Off, a film where they were both trying to do something neither of them had much experience with: a formal feature set-up: "I think we both learned a lot, I certainly did. And I'm anxious to correct the mistakes I made on that one."

The film was shot on 35mm (Kodak 5254), mainly in Toronto. Michael (Dunky)'s home is in the North York suburb of Don Mills, while the plot of land left him by his grandfather is near Timmins. All the locations were real, something Leiterman did not care for because of the tendency to want to rush. Technical problems associated with location shooting involved whether and how to light scenes, particularly for those filmed with a high speed camera for slow motion in a gymnasium: "There just wasn't enough light to shoot high speed, without putting in some fill light." Leiterman said he learned a lot making Rip-Off and he would never do it all the way he had done it again.

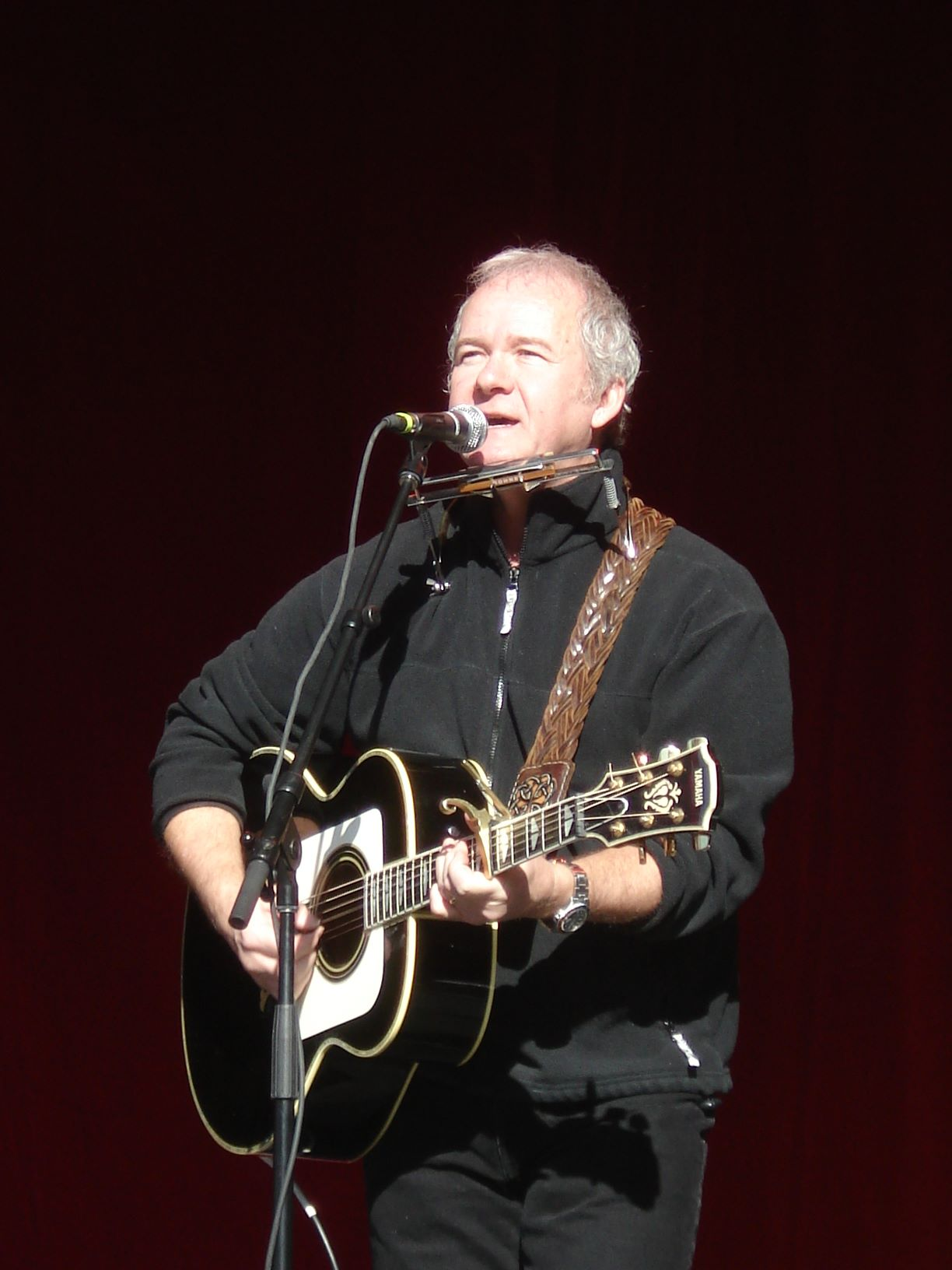
Murray McLauchlan in 2009

=== Music ===
Around the time of composing the score for Rip-Off with Gene Martynec, composer Murray McLauchlan released his first album, Songs from the Street (True North Records) in the summer of 1971.

== Release ==
Rip-Off was released on 30 September 1971, and in October 1972 in the United States.

=== Home media ===
Rip-Off was released on VHS in the United States under the title Virgin Territory.

== Reception ==
=== Commercial performance ===
The film was a commercial failure.

=== Critical response ===
==== Contemporary ====
John Hofsess faulted the film for being less funny than a comedy is supposed to be, and "while some good-natured spoofing of the intense, humorless youth scene is needed, the fault here is that acting as comic foils the characters seem even dumber than usual. ... The film is so uneven — annoyingly cute and predictable in one scene, genuinely funny and original the next — that it seems slapdash." He praises the twenty-year-old Susan Petrie, who makes a "smashing debut" and steals scenes from every other actor, and proceeds to analyse both what works in the film and the contemporary audience response to similar films:

Over a period of about five years Shebib evolved a documentary style suffused with a wry, ironic humanism. It's a superb style for needling the sacred cows of the establishment and the sanctimonious bull of counter-culture groups. The best scenes in Rip-Off are done in that style. Parents aren't depicted as shrill, neurotic harpies and young people aren't given a self-congratulatory snow job. But Rip-Off is engaged in a thankless task. Audiences at the recent Canadian Film Awards guffawed every time a screen character said "groovy," "far out" or "out of sight" (nine of the 13 features shown had such a character, usually the film's token pothead). They weren't laughing with discernment at bad scripting. It was the hypocritical laughter of people who found only the quaintness of yesterday's slanguage ridiculous. It illustrates the danger to any film maker who bows to trendy things: Exploit the public's infirmities and the public will revenge itself.

Wyndham Wise described the film as "a light, inoffensive comedy", the first half of which "holds together fairly well and has some fine comic scenes," but then it "becomes very episodic, almost to the point of boredom towards the end; it doesn't have much depth and if there is a point, it gets lost somewhere in the middle."

Shebib himself thought the film "didn't work" at least in terms of asking social questions "because the vehicle I used wasn't right." Leiterman conceded that the film was not flawless, "in either direction or in script. Or in cinematography. It's not a mind blowing film. It wasn't intended to be. It was dealing with many problems very lightly, but leaving a lot up to the audience's imagination to carry it on further. It was presenting a lot of problems that kids are up against now, and I think we did that fairly well.

A lot of it's pretty silly, a lot of it is funny, a lot of it's corny. But I saw the writing on the wall about everyone wanting to be creative. Nobody wants to work anymore, everybody wants to be a writer or a rock star or a movie director or actor. Well, not many people are actually fit to do it... That's what I saw coming 40 years ago. Everybody wants to tell their life story... It all sprung from the hippie hair period, five or six years prior to that.

— Don Shebib (interview with Weisberg, 2013)

==== Retrospective ====
Rip-Off has been rated by Geoff Pevere among English Canada's "most visually impressive features" of the 1970s and 1980s. Ralph Lucas, publisher of Northern Stars - Canadian Movie Database, suggests that the film "works better now" as a piece of nostalgia than at the time of its release: "Back then, some of the scenes were almost unwatchable, probably due to the embarrassment of the audience recognizing themselves up there on the screen." Justin Decloux agrees, calling it "a before it's [sic] time film", a "high minded" Porky's which may be "a little too earnest at times". TV Guide gives the film 3 stars out of 5: "A good understanding of teenagers' problems is displayed as the film documents their search to find something with which to identify and their dissatisfaction at discovering they're really not so different from everyone else." It features as one of Greg Klymkiw's 101 best Canadian films.
