= 41st Daytime Emmy Awards =

- Promotional advertisement
- Awarded for: Outstanding achievement in all fields of daytime television
- Date: June 22, 2014
- Location: Beverly Hilton Hotel; Beverly Hills, Los Angeles, California, U.S.
- Presented by: National Academy of Television Arts and Sciences
- Hosted by: Kathy Griffin

Highlights
- Most awards: The Young and the Restless (5)
- Most nominations: The Young and the Restless (26)
- Outstanding Drama Series: The Young and the Restless
- Outstanding Game Show: Jeopardy!
- Website: emmyonline.org

Television/radio coverage
- Network: DaytimeEmmys.net (online only)

The 41st Daytime Emmy Awards, presented by the National Academy of Television Arts and Sciences (NATAS), "recognizes outstanding achievement in all fields of daytime television production and are presented to individuals and programs broadcast from 2:00 a.m. to 6:00 p.m. during the 2013 calendar year". The ceremony took place on June 22, 2014 at The Beverly Hilton, in Beverly Hills, California beginning at 5:00 p.m. PST / 8:00 p.m. EST.

For the first time in the event's four-decade history, the Daytime Emmy ceremony will forgo a traditional TV broadcast and instead air only online through the DaytimeEmmys.net website. In prior years, broadcast rights to the event were shared on a rotating basis by ABC, CBS, and NBC, with exceptions in 2009 (The CW), 2012, and 2013 (cable's HLN both years). The ceremony was also executive produced by Spike Jones Jr. and SJ2 Entertainment with Terry D. Peterson.

The evening was hosted by comedian Kathy Griffin for the first time. The drama pre-nominees were announced on March 3, 2014 and the standards nominations were announced on May 1, 2014.

In October 2013, the Academy announced the addition of two new categories, “Outstanding Entertainment News” which will honor the entertainment industry with a focus on human interest, popular culture and celebrity gossip and interviews. The second new category, “Outstanding New Approaches Drama Series” will honor any daytime drama series which has less than 35 original episodes in the 2013 calendar year. In related events, the 40th Annual Creative Arts Emmy Awards ceremony was held at the Westin Bonaventure in Los Angeles on June 20, 2014.

The Young and the Restless won the most awards, with five trophies including for Outstanding Drama Series. The series also had received the most nominations, with a total of 26 (including Creative Arts Emmy Awards). Although, being defunct and revived online One Life to Live won in the Outstanding Drama Series Directing Team category.

While, Days of Our Lives earned three wins out of the six acting categories including the third consecutive win of Chandler Massey in the Outstanding Younger Actor in a Drama Series category. Massey made history with his win as he is the second actor to win the category three times – following Jonathan Jackson, who won for General Hospital in 1995, 1998, and 1999 – and the first to do so in consecutive years. Steve Harvey won Outstanding Game Show Host for Family Feud while his talk show series, Steve Harvey won Outstanding Talk Show/Informative.

== Winners and nominees ==
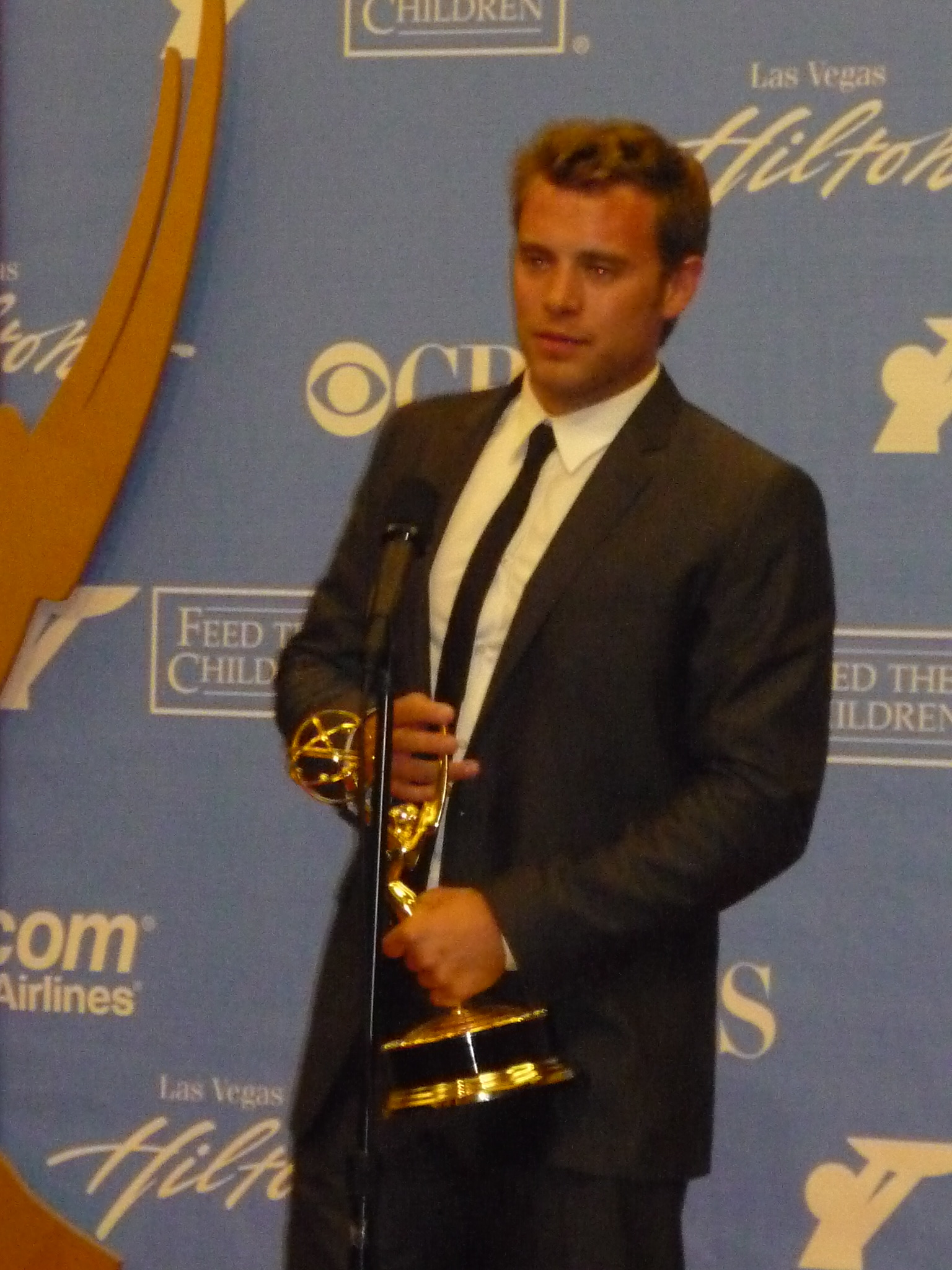
Billy Miller, Outstanding Lead Actor in a Drama Series winner

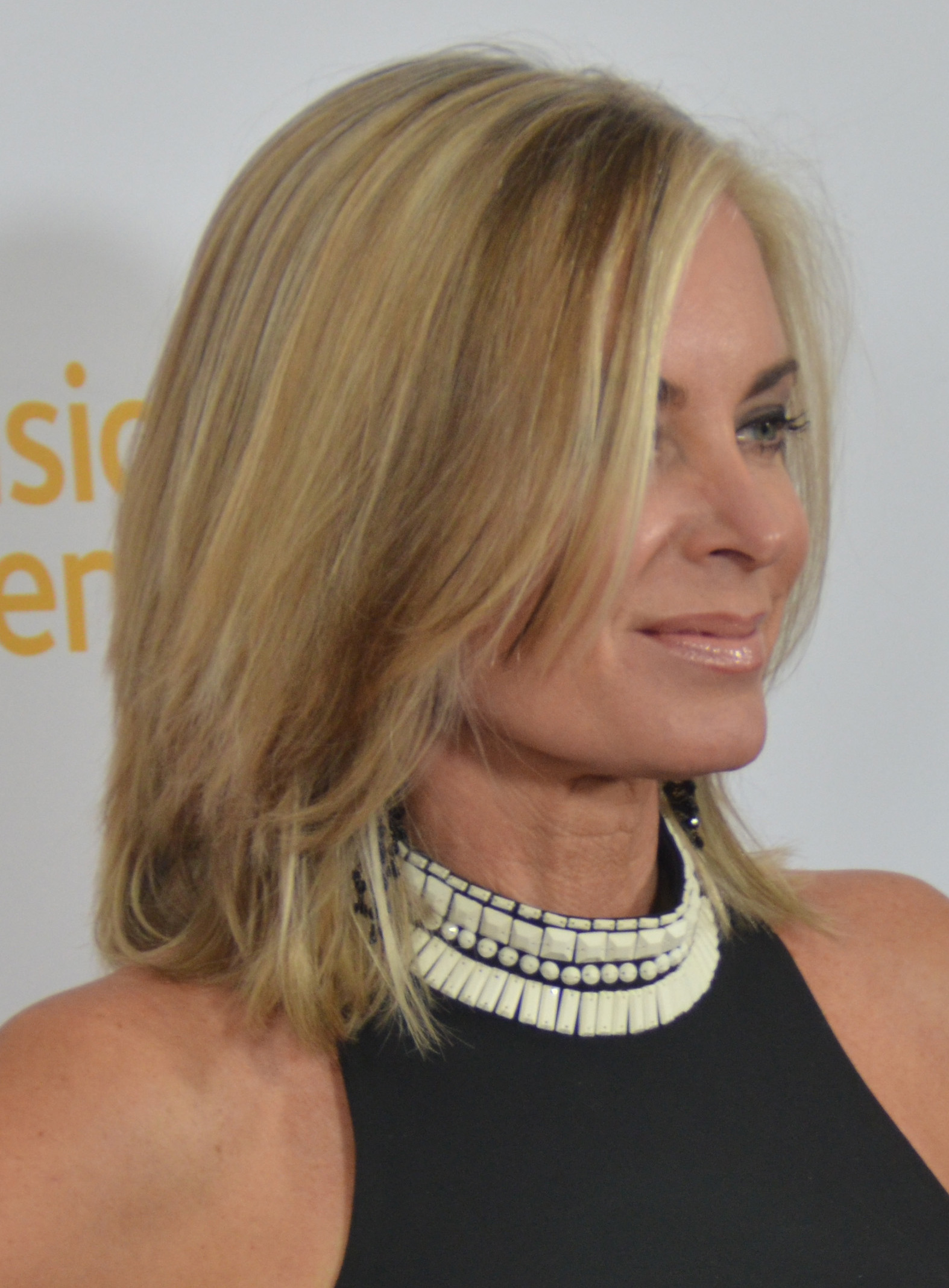
Eileen Davidson, Outstanding Lead Actress in a Drama Series winner

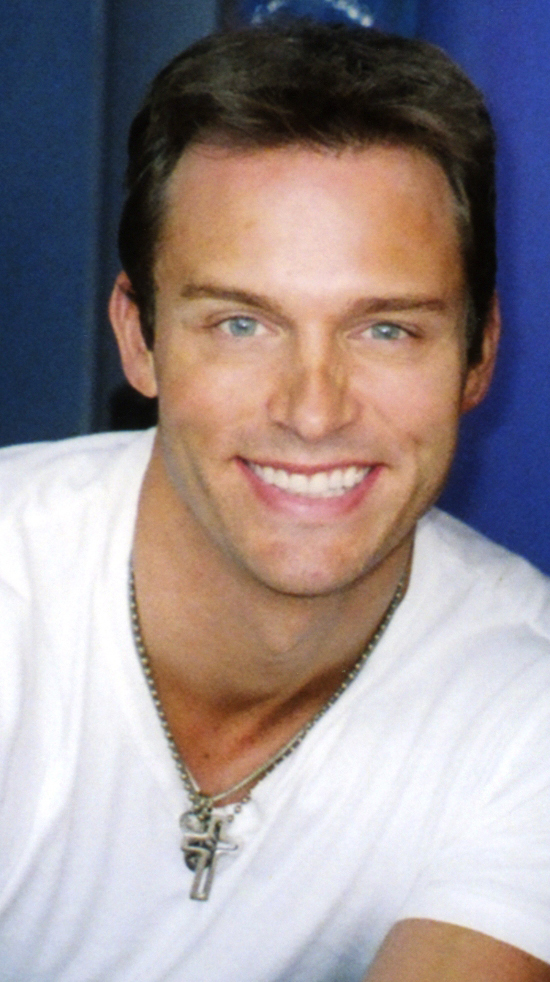
Eric Martsolf, Outstanding Supporting Actor in a Drama Series winner

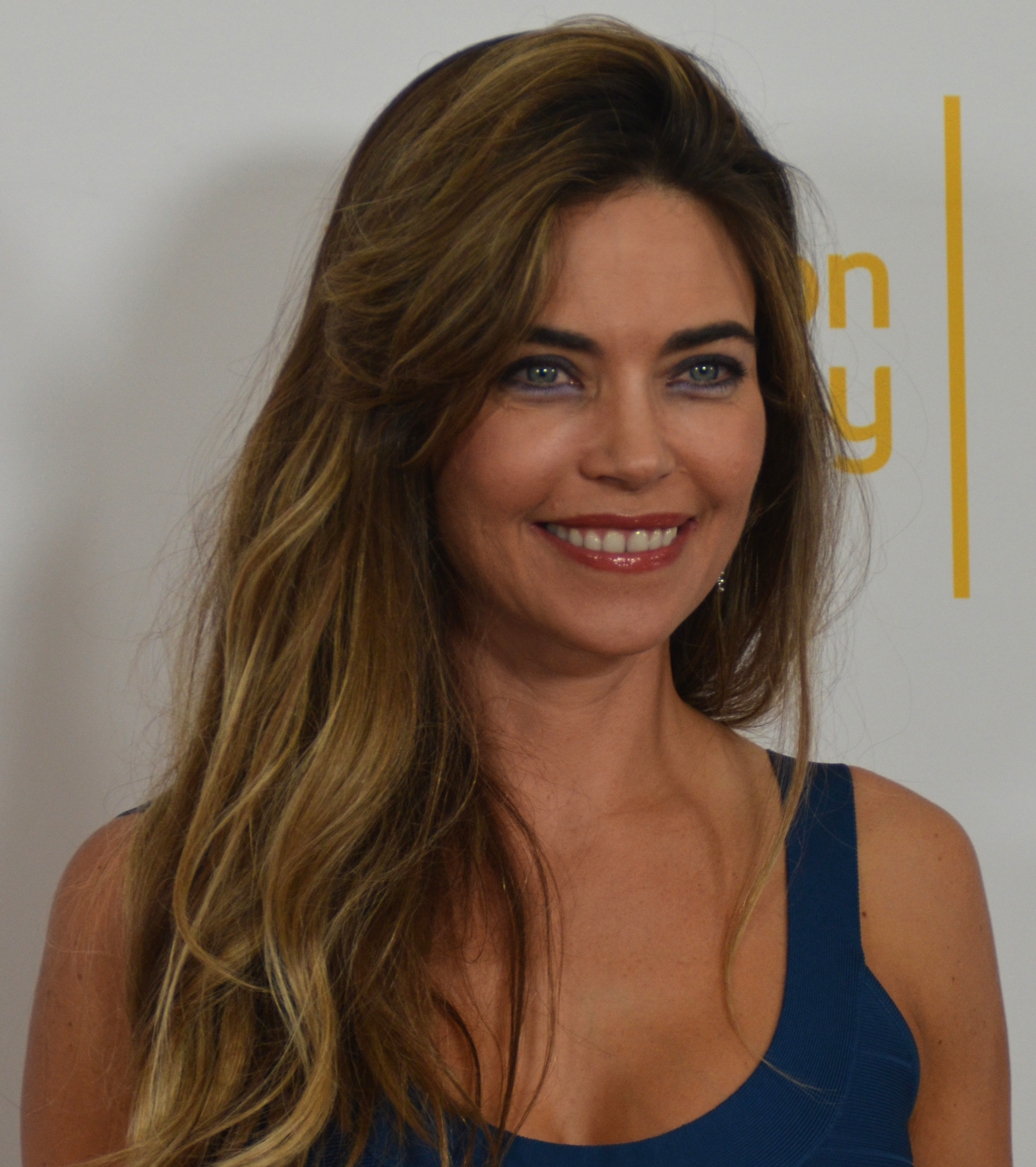
Amelia Heinle, Outstanding Supporting Actress in a Drama Series winner

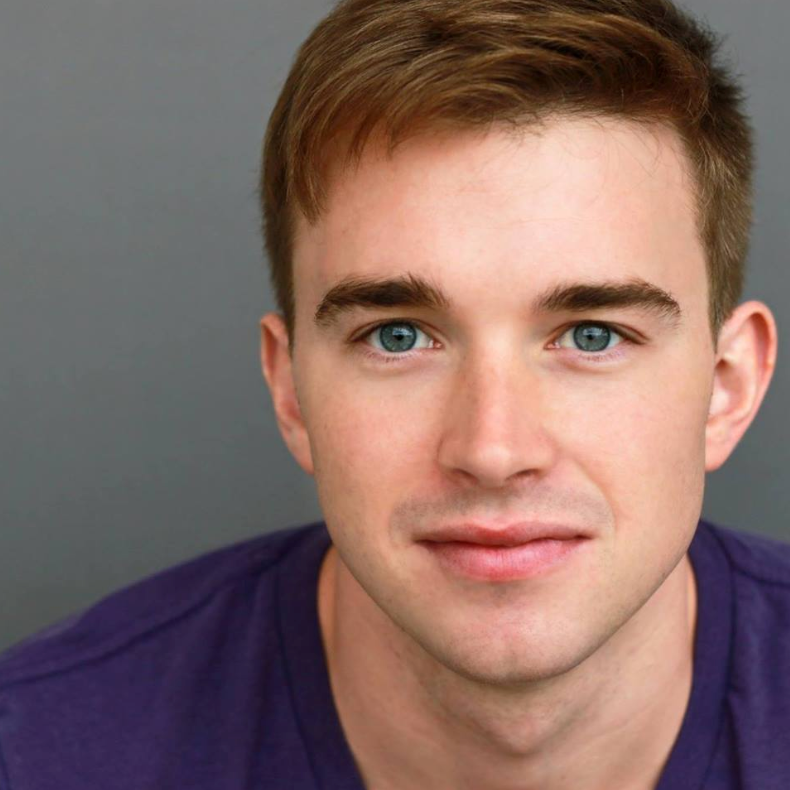
Chandler Massey, Outstanding Younger Actor in a Drama Series winner

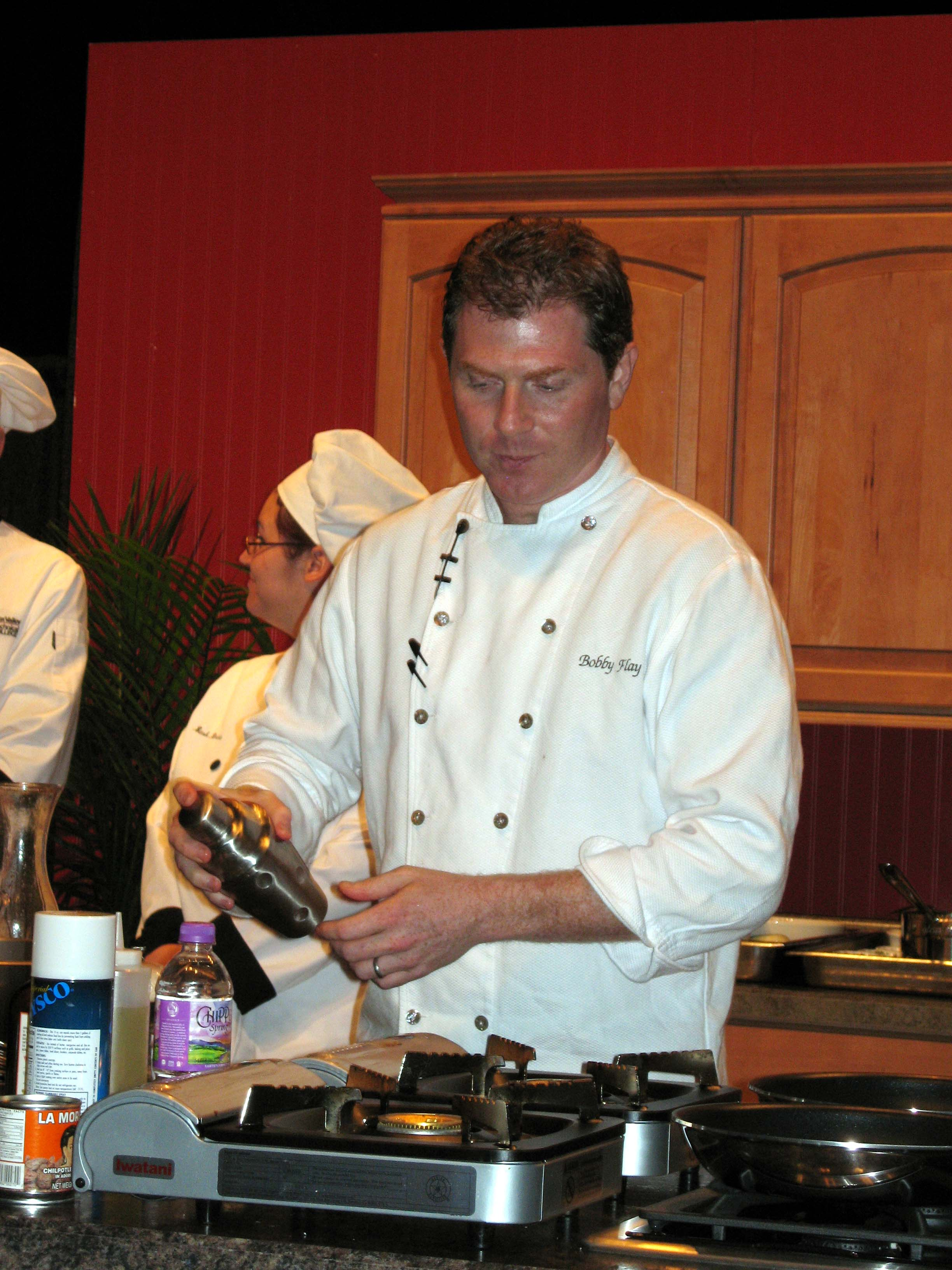
Bobby Flay, Outstanding Culinary Host winner

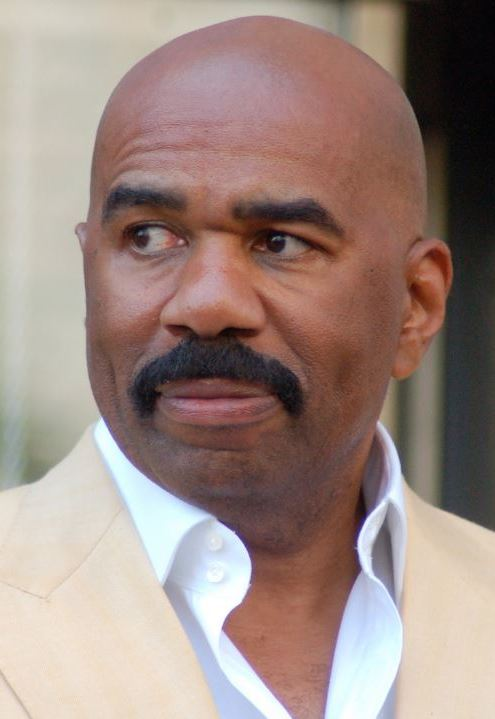
Steve Harvey, Outstanding Game Show Host winner

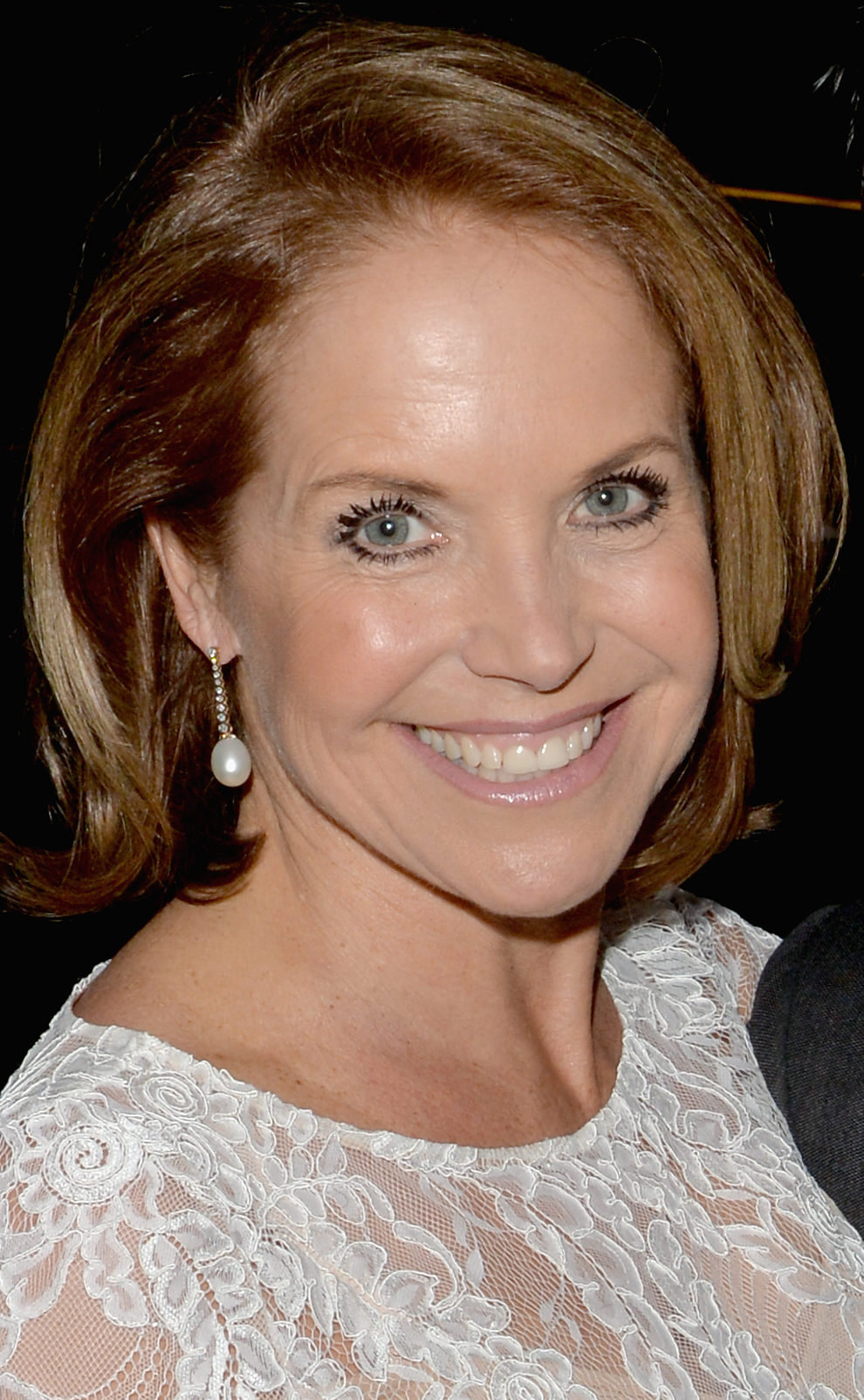
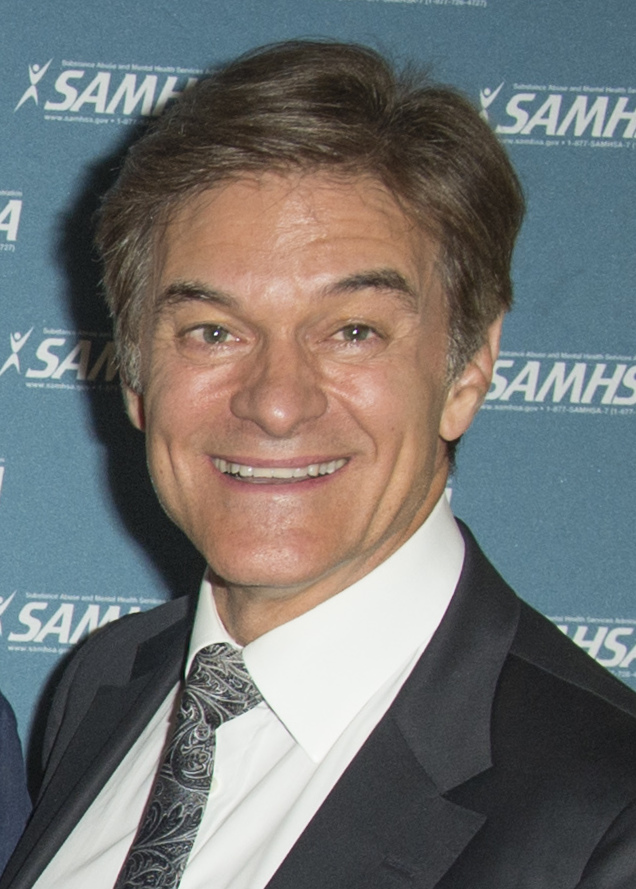
Katie Couric (top) and Mehmet Oz (bottom), Outstanding Talk Show Host winners

In the lists below, the winner of the category is shown first, with a double-dagger (‡), followed by the other nominees.

Category	Winners and nominees
Outstanding Drama Series	The Young and the Restless‡ (CBS); The Bold and the Beautiful (CBS); Days of Our Lives (NBC); One Life to Live (TOLN)
Outstanding New Approaches Drama Series	Venice: The Series‡ (VeniceTheSeries.com); DeVanity (DeVanity.com); Tainted Dreams (YOUTUBE); The Power Inside (YOUTUBE)
Outstanding Culinary Program	The Mind of a Chef‡ (PBS); A Moveable Feast with Fine Cooking (PBS); Beer Geeks (SYN); Bobby Flay's Barbecue Addiction (FOOD); Giada at Home (FOOD); My Grandmother’s Ravioli (COOK)
Outstanding Game Show	Jeopardy!‡ (ABC); The American Bible Challenge (GSN); The Chase (GSN); Let's Make a Deal (CBS); The Price Is Right (CBS); Wheel of Fortune (ABC)
Outstanding Legal/Courtroom Program	The People’s Court‡ (SYN); Judge Judy (SYN); Justice for All with Judge Cristina Perez (SYN); Divorce Court (SYN)
Outstanding Morning Program	Good Morning America‡ (ABC); CBS News Sunday Morning (CBS); CBS This Morning (CBS); The Today Show (NBC)
Outstanding Morning Program in Spanish	Un Nuevo Dia‡ (TEL); Despierta America (UNI)
Outstanding Talk Show/Informative	Steve Harvey‡ (NBC); The Chew (ABC); The Dr. Oz Show (SYN); Dr. Phil (CBS)
Outstanding Talk Show/Entertainment	The Ellen DeGeneres Show‡ (NBC); Live! with Kelly and Michael (ABC); Rachael Ray (SYN); The Talk (CBS); The View (ABC)
Outstanding Entertainment Program in Spanish	Clix‡ (CNNE); Destinos (CNNE); El Gordo y la Flaca (UNI); Showbiz (CNNE)
Outstanding Entertainment News Program	Entertainment Tonight‡ (CBS); Extra‡ (NBC); Access Hollywood (NBC); E! News (E!); TMZ (FOX)
Outstanding Special Class Special	The Young and the Restless: Jeanne Cooper Tribute (CBS); mun2 News Special: Hecho en America (mun2); Disney Parks Christmas Day Parade (ABC); A World of Dreams: Voices From the OUT100 (Here TV)
Outstanding Lead Actress in a Drama Series	Eileen Davidson as Kristen DiMera in Days of Our Lives‡; Katherine Kelly Lang as Brooke Logan in The Bold and the Beautiful; Heather Tom as Katie Logan in The Bold and the Beautiful; Arianne Zucker as Nicole Walker in Days of Our Lives
Outstanding Lead Actor in a Drama Series	Billy Miller as Billy Abbott in The Young and the Restless‡; Peter Bergman as Jack Abbott in The Young and the Restless; Doug Davidson as Paul Williams in The Young and the Restless; Christian LeBlanc as Michael Baldwin in The Young and the Restless; Jason Thompson as Dr. Patrick Drake in General Hospital
Outstanding Supporting Actress in a Drama Series	Amelia Heinle as Victoria Newman in The Young and the Restless‡; Melissa Claire Egan as Chelsea Newman in The Young and the Restless; Jane Elliot as Tracy Quartermaine in General Hospital; Elizabeth Hendrickson as Chloe Fisher in The Young and the Restless; Kelly Sullivan as Connie Falconeri in General Hospital
Outstanding Supporting Actor in a Drama Series	Eric Martsolf as Brady Black in Days of Our Lives‡; Bradford Anderson as Damian Spinelli in General Hospital; Steve Burton as Dylan McAvoy in The Young and the Restless; Scott Clifton as Liam Spencer in The Bold and the Beautiful; Dominic Zamprogna as Dante Falconeri in General Hospital
Outstanding Younger Actress in a Drama Series	Hunter King as Summer Newman in The Young and the Restless‡; Kristen Alderson as Starr Manning in General Hospital; Linsey Godfrey as Caroline Spencer Forrester in The Bold and the Beautiful; Kim Matula as Hope Logan in The Bold and the Beautiful; Kelley Missal as Danielle Manning in One Life to Live
Outstanding Younger Actor in a Drama Series	Chandler Massey as Will Horton in Days of Our Lives‡; Bryan Craig as Morgan Corinthos in General Hospital; Chad Duell as Michael Corinthos in General Hospital; Max Ehrich as Fenmore Baldwin in The Young and the Restless; Daniel Polo as Jamie Vernon in The Young and the Restless
Outstanding Culinary Host	Bobby Flay, Bobby Flay's Barbecue Addiction‡ (FOOD); April Bloomfield, Sean Brock - The Mind of a Chef (PBS); Giada De Laurentiis - Giada at Home (FOOD); Rachael Ray - Rachael Ray's Week in a Day (FOOD)
Outstanding Daytime Talent in Spanish	Rodner Figueroa, El Gordo y la Flaca‡ (UNI); Carlos Calderon, El Gordo y la Flaca (UNI); Alejandra Espinoza, El Gordo y la Flaca (UNI); Lili Estefan, El Gordo y la Flaca (UNI); Patricia Janitot, Nuestro Mundo (CNNE)
Outstanding Game Show Host	Steve Harvey in Family Feud‡ (SYN); Wayne Brady in Let's Make a Deal (CBS); Jeff Foxworthy in The American Bible Challenge (GSN); Todd Newton in Family Game Night (HUB)
Outstanding Talk Show Host	Katie Couric - Katie‡ (ABC); Mehmet Oz - The Dr. Oz Show‡ (SYN); Julie Chen, Sara Gilbert, Sharon Osbourne, Sheryl Underwood and Aisha Tyler - The Talk (CBS); Whoopi Goldberg, Sherri Shepherd, Barbara Walters and Jenny McCarthy - The View (ABC); Rachael Ray - Rachael Ray (SYN)
Outstanding Drama Series Writing Team	The Young and the Restless‡ (CBS); The Bold and the Beautiful (CBS); Days of Our Lives (NBC)
Outstanding Drama Series Directing Team	One Life to Live‡ (TOLN); The Bold and the Beautiful (CBS); The Young and the Restless (CBS)
