= Lauren Fenmore =

Fictional character from The Young and the Restless

- The Young and the Restless character
- Tracey E. Bregman as Lauren Fenmore
- Portrayed by: Tracey E. Bregman (1983–present); Caryn Richman (1991)
- Duration: 1983–present
- First appearance: January 25, 1983
- Created by: William J. Bell
- Introduced by: H. Wesley Kenney (1983); Lee Phillip Bell (1992–1995); Edward J. Scott (2000–2001); Bradley Bell (2002, 2004, 2007); Bradley Bell and Michael Minnis (2022–2024)
- Crossover appearances: The Bold and the Beautiful
In-universe information
- Other names: Lauren Baldwin; Lauren Grainger; Lauren Williams
- Occupation: Businesswoman; Singer
- Parents: Neil Fenmore; Joanna Manning
- Half-sisters: Jill Abbott
- Spouse: Paul Williams (1984–1986); Scott Grainger, Sr. (1989–1993); Michael Baldwin (2005–present)
- Children: Scotty Grainger; Dylan Fenmore (legal); Fenmore Baldwin
- Nieces and nephews: Phillip Chancellor III; Billy Abbott

Lauren Fenmore is a fictional character from The Young and the Restless and The Bold and the Beautiful, American soap operas on the CBS network. Introduced by William J. Bell, the character made her debut during the episode airing on January 25, 1983, portrayed by Tracey E. Bregman. In 1992, Bregman brought the character to The Bold and the Beautiful, resulting in her migrating there fully in 1995. In 2000, Bregman returned to The Young and the Restless, remaining on a recurring status.

The character was first married to private investigator Paul Williams (Doug Davidson) for two years. Much of Lauren's history on both soap operas revolves around her rivalry with villain Sheila Carter (Kimberlin Brown). They first fought over Scott Grainger (Peter Barton) in the early 1990s, with a love triangle forming around the three characters. The character was married to Scott twice and shares a son with him, Scotty (Blair Redford). Lauren has had numerous other storylines with Sheila throughout the years.

In 2007, the character supposedly killed a woman claiming to be Sheila in self-defense. Lauren also has a long-running romantic history with Michael Baldwin (Christian LeBlanc), whom she married in 2005. They share a son together, Fenmore Baldwin (Max Ehrich/Zach Tinker). In 2010, Bregman portrayed dual roles as Lauren and Sheila's previously unheard of sister, Sarah Smythe, who was also killed by Lauren in self-defense. In 2013, after twelve years on a recurring status, Bregman was placed back on contract with the series. The actress has been positively received for her portrayal, which has garnered numerous Daytime Emmy Award and Soap Opera Digest Award nominations.

== Casting ==
Bregman believed her role as Lauren would be brief, but after six months the soap offered her a contract and she accepted. On September 17, 1992, Bregman crossed over to The Bold and the Beautiful. She crossed over again on September 24, 1992, and departed on October 1, 1992. Bregman began making recurring appearances on the show on March 24 to April 5, 1993; April 28 to May 10, 1993; May 14, 1993; November 2 to 16, 1993; February 3, 1995; March 6 to 21, 1995; May 23, 1995; and June 2 to 7, 1995. The actress left The Young and the Restless on October 13, 1995, and migrated to its sister soap full-time on October 17, 1995, until August 16, 1999. Bregman would later make a few guest appearances on B&B on July 5, 2002; May 17 to 20, 2004; January 22, 2007; October 31, 2022; October 25 to 31, 2023; April 4 to 5, 2024; and April 18 to 22, 2024.

After a return guest appearance on Y&R on June 15 to 26, 2000, and November 10 to 24, 2000, Bregman returned on a recurring status on August 24, 2001. In March 2013, it was announced that, after twelve years on recurring, Bregman had been placed back on contract with the series. She was downgraded back to recurring status in November 2016.

Actress Caryn Richman briefly played Lauren during Bregman's maternity leave in 1991.

In 1985, Bregman became the first actress to be honored with the Daytime Emmy Award for Outstanding Younger Actress in a Drama Series; when it was then titled "Outstanding Ingenue in a Drama Series." She was nominated for Daytime Emmy Award for Outstanding Supporting Actress in a Drama Series in 2006 and 2008.

== Development ==
Lauren's first love interest on The Young and the Restless was Paul Williams (Doug Davidson). Davidson describes the relationship as Paul's "first non-drama fling", and stated that William J. Bell made the decision to pair the characters together spontaneously in the "spur of the moment", wanting to see the outcome. The actor enjoys the dynamics between the characters of Lauren and Paul, stating: "I always am excited whenever I get to work with her. We’ve played friends, husband and wife, enemies, you name it. She is a dynamic actress and a wonderful friend and person." The couple faced various challenges, including constant disapproval from Paul's mother Mary Williams (Carolyn Conwell), and Lauren's crazed stalker, Shawn Garrett (Grant Cramer). Lauren and Paul divorced, with Lynda Hirsch of the Sun Sentinel noting: "The marriage didn't work out, since Lauren desperately wanted a career in music and Paul wanted her to be a stay-at-home wife and eventually a mom." Among other marriages, Lauren is recognized for her long-running marriage to Michael Baldwin (Christian LeBlanc). Michael and Lauren have been described as one of the show's "most enduring couples". LeBlanc said "If it weren't for Lauren, Michael would have been off the deep end long before this." He further told TV Guide about the pairing, "What's great about Lauren and Michael is that these are people who are not saints, who were adults when they met and have pasts they are not proud of. And they found each other."

The character is known for her longtime rivalry with Sheila Carter (Kimberlin Brown). On the topic of Lauren and Sheila's "cat fights", Brown said: "People like cat fights because we can get away with what you can't get away with in everyday life. You're living vicariously through me. There might be someone that [boy] you just might want to put it to someday, and you can't, but you can turn on the TV and see Sheila do it, and get away with it. Being mean and evil and fighting and by the end of the day, you're spent." Lauren is also known for having been kidnapped on several occasions. In 2010, she was involved in a doppelgänger storyline. A woman claiming to be Sheila's sister, Sarah Smythe, had plastic surgery to look like Lauren; she wanted revenge on Lauren for killing Sheila. Of the storyline, Bregman said, "Sarah really wants Lauren to suffer because Sarah has suffered so much. In Sarah’s mind, Sheila was murdered in cold blood by Lauren. Also, Sarah had to raise Sheila’s children because Sheila was always so obsessed with Lauren that she wasn’t around to raise her kids properly." In 2012, Lauren and Michael's son Fenmore (Max Ehrich) began acting out, and developed a "bad side". Bregman explained that Lauren and Michael had "no role models" because, "Lauren’s father died early on, and she had a horrible mother", which could be the reasoning behind Fen's behavior.

== Storylines ==
Lauren Fenmore is raised by her father Neil Fenmore (Jim Storm) due to her parents' divorce. Lauren rebels during her teen years, singing with Danny Romalotti (Michael Damian) and Traci Abbott (Beth Maitland), who became her rival for many years to come. Lauren spends years bullying and scheming against an insecure Traci. As she matures, Lauren falls in love with and marries private investigator Paul Williams (Doug Davidson), to the dismay of his interfering mother Mary (Carolyn Conwell). A stalker named Shawn Garrett (Grant Cramer) targets Lauren and forcing her to leave Paul by threatening to kill Paul if she didn't. Lauren discovers she is pregnant and is buried alive by Shawn (after he overhears her true feelings for him), though eventually saved by Paul, having lost the child. Paul leaves Lauren for good after she sells a nude photograph of him to a magazine. Neil dies and leaves Lauren as the owner of the Fenmore Department store chain.

Lauren falls in love with and later marries Dr. Scott Grainger (Peter Barton). However, a mentally unstable nurse named Sheila Carter (Kimberlin Brown) plots to steal Scott away from Lauren. Sheila drugs Scott and sleeps with him, allowing herself to become pregnant; Scott leaves Lauren to be with Sheila for the sake of the child. During this time, Lauren finds out that she is also pregnant, while Sheila loses her child. Sheila then fakes a pregnancy and purchases a baby on the black market and switches it with Lauren's baby boy when he is born. Lauren is left to believe her child died, though Sheila's mother Molly (Marilyn Alex) tells her the truth. Sheila kidnaps both Lauren and Molly and sets fire to the cabin they are in; Lauren and Molly make it out alive though Sheila is presumed dead. Lauren later learns that Sheila is alive in Los Angeles and engaged to Eric Forrester (John McCook). Scotty dies and makes Lauren promise to make peace with Sheila, who he believes has changed. When Sheila later attempts to drown Lauren in a hot tub, however, Lauren informs Dr. James Warwick (Ian Buchanan) of Sheila's destructive past. Lauren helps the Forresters get Sheila committed after Sheila holds them all hostage. During her stay in Los Angeles, Lauren engages in a brief romance with Eric, to the chagrin of his wife and Lauren's former friend Stephanie Douglas Forrester (Susan Flannery). They eventually break up.

After crossing forth between Los Angeles and Genoa City, Lauren returns to Genoa City for a permanent stay in 2001, when she begins a partnership with Jabot Cosmetics. Lauren then reunites with Paul; the relationship recurs due to Paul's unstable former lover Isabella Braña's (Eva Longoria) pregnancy, as well as his romance with another ex-wife, Christine Blair (Lauralee Bell). Lauren is stalked by a teenager named Kevin Fisher (Greg Rikaart), who developed an obsession with her. After learning that Lauren accepted his prom invitation only to try to make him confess the crimes he committed, Kevin holds Lauren captive. During the abduction, Kevin tries to commit suicide, though his elder half-brother Michael Baldwin (Christian LeBlanc) talks him out of it and rescues Lauren. This period saw Lauren and Michael grow unexpectedly closer, and they begin a relationship which soon progresses into an engagement. Lauren's now grown up son Scott (Blair Redford) returns to Genoa City. It is revealed that Sheila had broken out of prison and had another female undergo plastic surgery to take her place; Lauren believes this is Sheila and resumes her normal life after an anxious period. Sheila has been living near Scott, who she grew close to. Sheila then returns to Genoa City and torments Lauren, involving Kevin's father Tom Fisher (Roscoe Born) in her next scheme. After Michael and Lauren's wedding, they retreat to a honeymoon on a yacht. Tom and Sheila show up, and blow up the yacht, allowing everyone to believe Lauren is dead. In reality, Tom had abducted both Sheila and Lauren. Lauren is eventually saved by Paul, though Sheila once again disappears.

Lauren and Michael become pregnant, though stress over Sheila wanting to steal her child leads Lauren to suffer anxiety during her pregnancy. She gives birth to a premature son, Fenmore Baldwin (Max Ehrich). Paul locates a woman claiming to be Sheila in Genoa City; she underwent plastic surgery to look like Lauren's best friend Phyllis Summers (Michelle Stafford). Paul holds Sheila captive in a cage she created herself to entrap Fenmore. Sheila manages to escape and kidnaps Phyllis, her daughter Summer Newman (Hunter King) and Fenmore. Lauren frantically worries and eventually tracks down Sheila, Phyllis, Summer and Fenmore. Lauren shoots Sheila and resumes her peaceful life with Michael and Fenmore. In the following years Lauren helps Michael deal with his father River Baldwin (Michael Gross) and sister Eden Gerick (Vanessa Marano), who return to Genoa City.

Lauren begins acting erratically, even sharing a kiss with Paul at a bar. Soon, she is abducted by Sheila's previously unheard of sister Sarah Smythe (Bregman), who is aided by Sheila's long lost twin children, Ryder Callahan and Daisy Carter. Sarah then poses as Lauren, as revenge for killing Sheila. Michael rescues Lauren and Kevin's wife Jana Hawkes (Emily O'Brien), who Sarah was also holding captive. Lauren shoots and kills Sarah.

Lauren's life is complicated when she learns that Jill Foster Abbott (Jess Walton) is Neil's daughter, therefore her half-sister. Lauren's estranged mother confirms that Neil was aware of an illegitimate child, and Jill is granted ownership of Fenmore's Department stores. Despite an initial bitter rivalry, Lauren and Jill soon develop a relationship. Lauren continues to strive in her business career, earning a seat on Victor Newman's (Eric Braeden) board of directors at Newman Enterprises. Fenmore soon develops into a rebellious teenager, much like Michael and Lauren were during their upbringing, and develops an obsession with a now also teenage Summer. Summer and Fenmore bully a troubled fellow student, Jamie Vernon. Jamie and Fenmore have a fight on a rooftop, and Jamie falls onto a roof below. Jamie lies and tells the police that Fen pushed him, which is false. District attorney Michael is now forced to arrest Fenmore, weakening Michael and Lauren's marriage. Michael moves out and Lauren has an affair with the manipulative Carmine Basco (Marco Dapper), who develops an obsession with his love for Lauren. The affair is revealed, further straining the marriage. With much work, Lauren and Michael are able to get back together. However, they are soon forced to deal with an unstable Carmine who is consumed by Lauren, posting a video of their sexual encounter online and even kidnapping Lauren briefly.

== Reception ==
In 2022, Charlie Mason from Soaps She Knows placed Lauren 15th on his list of the best 25 characters from The Young and the Restless, commenting "A mean girl way before there even was such a thing, Tracey E. Bregman's impetuous character hasn't softened over the years so much as she's grown, into a savvy businesswoman who, thankfully, has retained her sense of playfulness and mischief."
