= List of The Young and the Restless characters introduced in 2012 =

The Young and the Restless is an American television soap opera. It was first broadcast on March 26, 1973, and airs on CBS. The following is a list of characters that first appeared in 2012, by order of appearance. All characters that appeared before August 2012 were introduced by the show's former head writer and executive producer Maria Arena Bell. Beyond that point, all characters are introduced by Bell's replacements: executive producer Jill Farren Phelps and head writer Josh Griffith. Anita Lawson and Sarge Wilder. Carmine Basco first appeared in March, while April saw the birth of Johnny Abbott on-screen. Beth Hortense debuted in June with Sister Celeste beginning her short stint in August. Jamie Vernon first appeared in October, while Alex Chavez and Mason Wilder were introduced in December.

== Anita Lawson ==
Anita Lawson
- The Young and the Restless character
- Portrayed by: Catherine Bach
- Duration: 2012–2019
- First appearance: February 7, 2012
- Last appearance: June 14, 2019
- Created by: Maria Arena Bell, Hogan Sheffer and Scott Hamner
- Introduced by: Maria Arena Bell (2012); Anthony Morina and Josh Griffith (2019)
In-universe information
- Husband: Jeffrey Bardwell (dissolved)
- Daughters: Chelsea Lawson
- Grandsons: Johnny Abbott; Connor Newman

Anita Lawson first appeared on February 7, 2012, as the mother of Chelsea Lawson (Melissa Claire Egan). Casting for the role was announced on January 6, 2012. She is portrayed by former The Dukes of Hazzard actress Catherine Bach on a recurring basis. Entertainment Weekly reported that Anita is "the scheming mother of Chelsea". The character of Anita first aired on February 7, 2012. She began taping for the role on January 9, 2012. The official site provided a teaser for Anita's storyline: "Bringing more drama to the already testy situation between Billy, Victoria and Chelsea's surprise pregnancy, Bach will play Anita and join her daughter on a quest to conspire against Billy Abbott."

Anita arrived in town searching for her daughter, Chelsea, to whom which she appeared to be extremely displeased finding out that she is pregnant with Billy Abbott's (Billy Miller) child. It is revealed later that she was brought to town by Victor Newman to town so that she could cause problems in Billy's marriage to his daughter Victoria Newman. Anita sees Jeffrey Bardwell at the local nightclub, Gloworm, and recognizes him, though he doesn't know her due to memory loss. She reveals to Chelsea she has found her father and that it is none other than Jeffrey, which is later confirmed by a DNA test. However, Jeffrey tells Chelsea that her father is his deceased twin brother, William Bardwell. Later on, Anita calls Jeffrey thanking him for the trip around the world; meaning he paid her to leave town until the paternity mess is over. During this phone call Anita reminds Jeffrey that they are still legally married. Four months later, Anita returned to Genoa City upon learning Chelsea is engaged to Adam Newman. Chelsea still firmly believed that Jeffrey was her father, so Anita revealed that the man she slept with had a heart shaped birthmark. Jeffrey's wife, Gloria Bardwell, then realized that Jeffrey was in fact Chelsea's father. Anita also tells Jeffrey that if he does not keep sending her checks, she will show their marriage certificate to Chelsea and Gloria. She ended up doing so, but Gloria ended up forgiving him and Chelsea began to accept Jeffrey as her father.

Nine months and one miscarriage later, Anita grilled Chelsea when she found out that Chelsea was pregnant by her now-ex-husband, Adam, but had told lowly bartender/carpenter Dylan that the baby was his. Anita was disappointed in Chelsea's choice when she could have used the baby to win back a rich man like Adam, warned her that everything will blow up in her face when Dylan finds out he was used, and suggested she get out of it before it was too late. Soon Dylan and Chelsea exchanged "I love you's" while Anita attempted to tell Adam that he was the father of Chelsea's baby. But knowing Anita only wanted him with Chelsea because he had more money than Dylan, Adam refused to let her talk.

Anita was not pleased to learn that Dylan and Chelsea were engaged. Dylan surprised Chelsea by inviting Jeff and Anita to their place for dinner. Both were visibly disappointed in the place, and Jeff insulted Dylan as not being able to take care of his daughter. But Anita surprised Chelsea saying that Dylan was a good guy, and everything would be all right. They discussed potential baby names of Scarlet, Emily, or Terry after Dylan's dad. After Jeff made some more judgmental comments, Dylan said that he was not Adam and glad of it, because Adam was smart enough to make millions but smart enough to make Chelsea happy.

Not long afterward, Chelsea went into labor, and Dylan suggested to Chelsea that they get married right away. When Chelsea's labor stopped, Dylan took her home to his loft which was decorated for a wedding. The invited guests Chloe, Jeffrey, Anita, and Stitch arrived, followed by Billy with a cake catered by his restaurant. After some quick alterations to Chelsea's wedding gown by Chloe, the minister arrived, heartfelt vows were exchanged, and they were married using Dylan's parent's wedding rings. During the ceremony Anita flirted with Stitch. Afterward, Chelsea again went into labor, and Dylan delivered Terrance "Conner" McAvoy.

Since then Anita has been seen in GC on numerous occasions. Her most memorable occasion being in October 2015, to help her on screen daughter Chelsea Newman, leave GC. Although the plot did not go through Anita had a handful of episodes revolving around the storyline. Anita also returns in 2016 to spend time with her daughter and grandson, Conner

Anita returns in early 2018, after giving Nick Newman a flash drive, with a video recording from Chelsea explaining why she left, and confirming the paternity of Nicks son, Christian, who is revealed to be her ex-husbands, and Nicks half brother, Adam Newman's son.

Anita returns in mid 2019 when it is revealed that Adam Newman is alive.

== Sarge Wilder ==
Sarge Wilder
- The Young and the Restless character
- Portrayed by: Darnell Williams
- Duration: 2012–13
- First appearance: February 20, 2012
- Last appearance: March 5, 2013
- Introduced by: Maria Arena Bell
In-universe information
- Occupation: Physical therapist
- Nephews: Mason Wilder

Augustus "Sarge" Wilder first appeared on February 20, 2012. The role is portrayed by former All My Children actor Darnell Williams. In January 2012, rumors began to circulate that Williams would be joining the cast in a regular role. Debbi Morgan, who portrayed Harmony Hamilton and stars with Williams on ABC's All My Children, later confirmed it via Twitter. In November 2012, it was announced that Williams was taken off his contract and bumped to recurring. In December, actor Lamon Archey was introduced as Sarge's nephew, Mason Wilder.

Sarge is a tough-talking physical therapist who began working with Jack Abbott, who was paralyzed from the waist on down after being shot by his mentally ill ex-wife Patty Williams. Jack at first clashed with Sarge when he spotted him aggressively coaching one of his female patients, which Sarge uses as a way of building their strength to encourage them to work harder on their recovery. Jack later understood this method which lead him to ask Sarge to help him with his recovery as his female therapist didn't give him much hope on recovering. On March 20, Sarge was seen sitting in on an AA meeting just as Harmony took a seat next to him after she finished speaking. Harmony and Sarge later formally introduced themselves when she ran into him at the coffeehouse and they engaged in conversation as she spoke about her battles, but she became angry when Sarge revealed that he's been in AA supporting a patient of his, making Harmony feel like a fool as she believed she was confiding in someone who had struggles of his own. Sarge and Harmony have later pretended to be a couple to make Neil Winters jealous, growing a friendship in the process. Although the two have attraction to one another, Sarge wishes Neil luck in ending up with Harmony. Sarge would eventually reveal to Jack the reason he became a physical therapist. When he was younger, Augustus was a street racer and got in a very bad crash with a brick wall; although he was okay, his brother wasn't. Although his brother refused his help to the very present, Sarge wanted to make sure everyone had the chance to fight.

== Carmine Basco ==
Carmine Basco
- The Young and the Restless character
- Portrayed by: Marco Dapper
- Duration: 2012–14
- First appearance: March 27, 2012
- Last appearance: February 3, 2014
- Introduced by: Maria Arena Bell
In-universe information
- Occupation: Bartender
- Grandfathers: Giuseppe Basco

Carmine Basco first appeared on March 27, 2012, portrayed by Marco Dapper on a recurring status. He made his last appearance on February 3, 2014.

Dapper stated that former casting director Marnie Saitta helped him "change his whole outlook on everything", admitting that he previously believed the soap opera genre "sucked". He obtained the role by meeting with Judy Blye Wilson, another casting director, and said there was "good energy" between the two.

Carmine has dated Abby Newman (Marcy Rylan), and the relationship wasn't given closure upon Rylan's exit from the soap opera. Dapper admitted in an interview that the writers "didn't really know what to do with him after Abby left the first time". He was then written into the storyline of Michael Baldwin (Christian LeBlanc) and Lauren Fenmore's (Tracey Bregman) marital problems, becoming Lauren's lover who she cheats on Michael with. Dapper explained that, "A lot of people might end up hating him for it, but really, it's a storyline that gives Lauren and Michael a chance to mend their relationship and be even stronger coming back." He went on to say that Carmine "hasn't changed" and "this is just another side that everyone is seeing". He also stated that he hoped Carmine would have more of a "darker turn", and that he still believes there is a "left over spark" with Abby as their storyline "was never finished" and "nothing was wrapped up properly".

Storylines
Carmine was first mentioned as the notorious ex-boyfriend of Angelina Veneziano (Diana DeGarmo). Angelina's father Angelo (Mike Starr) forbid her from having contact with him and hired Kevin Fisher (Greg Rikaart) to make sure that didn't happen. Angelina then attempted to convince Kevin that she was pregnant with Carmine's child and that they had to run away together for safety, all of which was never true. Kevin and Angelina ended up marrying for their own safety from Angelo, which was later annulled.

Carmine arrived abruptly at Genoa City restaurant Gloworm looking for Kevin moments after Angelina and Angelo announced they were leaving town, claiming he stole Angelina from him and now he was going to steal Kevin's new wife, Chloe Mitchell (Elizabeth Hendrickson), from him. Carmine takes up residence in town and is later asked by Abby Newman (Marcy Rylan) to be a bartender at an upscale gala. Chloe suspects that Abby was crushing on Carmine though she immediately objected. Carmine arranges for the gala to go awry by getting Angelina to cancel her appearance at the event as well as getting the supply truck to arrive late. He attempts to kidnap Chloe but Abby saves her and takes her place in Carmine's car. However, Abby only did so as she was attracted to Carmine and told him she wanted to escape the disastrous gala. She and Carmine hide out in a motel room while all of Abby's loved ones believe she was kidnapped. Abby tells her mother it was a publicity stunt and they return home. They're both arrested for misuse of emergency services and face Abby's angry family members. After facing consequences, Abby and Carmine begin a relationship despite he being shunned by the town, but Abby is able to convince some of them that Carmine is a good soul.

Carmine, having lost all of his bartending jobs, later starts working the bar at the Genoa City Athletic Club, where he meets Lauren Fenmore (Tracey Bregman) who is facing marital problems with Michael Baldwin (Christian LeBlanc). He and Lauren grow close and even share kiss. Abby, having abruptly left town, returns to find Carmine refusing to resume their relationship as he has fallen for Lauren. He and Lauren then begin an affair, while Carmine befriends Lauren's son Fenmore Baldwin (Max Ehrich) and gets another bartending job at On The Boulevard, a new restaurant. After his affair with Lauren becomes known, she ends things in order to work on her marriage. However, Carmine refuses to let go of Lauren and begins stalking her and later kidnaps her, but Michael is able to come to her rescue. Carmine disappears while a warrant is issued for his arrest. He later returns and orchestrates a gas leak in their home and tells Lauren that he wants to die with her, but the police arrive in time to arrest him. During a prison transfer, Carmine escapes and makes his way to a banquet in which Lauren is being presented with an award. He manages to put a tape he made of them having sex on the big screen, humiliating Lauren and her family. Carmine is later found shot to death in an alleyway outside. Michael confesses to the murder and is sent to jail, but in reality Fen was the one who shot him. Fen confesses to the murder and Michael is released, just as Paul Williams (Doug Davidson) realizes something isn't right about the murder evidence.

After being in jail and on house arrest for several months, Fen decides to confess to Carmine's murder and be given a sentencing just as Michael finds Carmine, very much alive. Carmine reveals that he was in fact being transported into witness protection that day for giving the FBI evidence against another criminal, but he wanted to see Lauren one last time. Fen shot him that night but doctors and medical examiners secretly revived him and sent him into witness protection. He refuses to return to Genoa City to exonerate Fen because of his own safety, so instead Michael films him confessing that he is alive. Fen is exonerated as Carmine returns to his low profile life.

== Johnny Abbott ==
Johnny Abbott
- The Young and the Restless character
- Portrayed by: Holden and Ryan Hare (2013–2021); Paxton Mishkind (2022–present)
- Duration: 2012–present
- First appearance: April 9, 2012
- Created by: Maria Arena Bell; Hogan Sheffer; Scott Hamner
- Introduced by: Maria Arena Bell (2012); Anthony Morina and Josh Griffith (2022)
In-universe information
- Other names: John Robert Abbott IV
- Family: Newman
- Father: Billy Abbott
- Mother: Chelsea Lawson
- Adoptive mother: Victoria Newman
- Half-brothers: Connor Newman; Reed Hellstrom (adoptive)
- Half-sisters: Delia Abbott; Claire Grace (adoptive); Katie Abbott; Ruby Abbott
- Grandfathers: John Abbott; Jeffrey Bardwell; Victor Newman (adoptive)
- Grandmothers: Jill Abbott; Anita Lawson; Nikki Newman (adoptive)
- Uncles: Jack Abbott; Phillip Chancellor III; Nicholas Newman (adoptive); John Abbott III (adoptive); Adam Newman (adoptive); Dylan McAvoy (adoptive)
- Aunts: Traci Abbott; Ashley Abbott (legal); Abby Newman (adoptive)
- First cousins: Chance Chancellor; Abby Newman (legal); Colleen Carlton; Kyle Abbott; Keemo Volien Abbott; John Abbott III; Cassie Newman (adoptive); Noah Newman (adoptive); Summer Newman (adoptive); Faith Newman (adoptive); Connor Newman (adoptive); Christian Newman (adoptive); Dominic Abbott Newman Winters Chancellor (adoptive)
- Other relatives: Allie Nguyen; Harrison Locke

Johnny Abbott is the son of Billy Abbott and Chelsea Lawson. Chelsea was hired by Victor Newman to break up Billy's marriage to Victoria Newman. She drugged and seduced Billy which resulted in her pregnancy. After Johnny's birth, Chelsea terminated her parental rights, and Victoria adopted him.

In 2022, when Johnny is a teenager, he is told that Chelsea is his biological mother, and he does not take the news well. He and his biological half-brother, Connor Newman, start spending time together.

== Beth Hortense ==
Beth Hortense first appeared on June 12, 2012, as a neighbor of Tim Reid, portrayed by Brett Butler. Her casting in the role was announced by multiple sources in May 2012. Her initial scenes aired on June 12 and 14, 2012, however she returned for additional appearances from July 26 to September 10, 2012.

Beth was first seen being questioned by Paul Williams after her neighbor, Tim Reid, went missing. She revealed he was a quiet man who kept to himself. Over a month later, Beth was seen contacting Tim in a tropical vacation spot, where Ronan Malloy brought him to Genoa City for questioning concerning Phyllis Newman and a hit-and-run accident that occurred eighteen years prior. After Tim died in Phyllis' penthouse, she and Kevin Fisher brought him to his apartment to make it look like he died whilst at home. As a diversion, Kevin told Beth he was an encyclopedia salesman. When the police began investigating Tim's death, Beth revealed they were secret lovers, and later described the "encyclopedia salesman" to the police sketch artist.

== Sister Celeste ==
Sister Celeste appeared from August 22 to September 25, 2012, as "a streetwise nun who offers Victor Newman a helping hand." The role was portrayed by former One Day at a Time star Bonnie Franklin. Her casting was announced by multiple sources in July 2012. Of her character, Franklin stated: "I play a modern day nun, so no wimple or rosaries, who works in a waterfront area [...] she's a strong lady who knows what she wants to do. She works at a mission, helping the homeless and people who are in trouble, helping them pull it together so they can move forward. I find this man who is trouble and I try to help, but I don't trust this woman that I meet." She mentioned that "I'm coming into this as a totally new, fresh character, so I'm not even involved, quite honestly, with what's going on with Victor. I just greet them as my character meets them." Franklin said that she was happy to be working with Eric Braeden, who plays Victor, and Genie Francis, who plays Genevieve Atkinson, another core person in this storyline.

== Jamie Vernon ==
Jamie Vernon
- The Young and the Restless character
- Portrayed by: Daniel Polo
- Duration: 2012–13
- First appearance: October 23, 2012
- Last appearance: February 22, 2013
- Created by: Josh Griffith
- Introduced by: Jill Farren Phelps
In-universe information
- Occupation: Student

Jamie Vernon first appeared on October 23, 2012, as a teenaged high school student whom Ronan Malloy (Jeff Branson) mentors. Jamie was introduced by head writer Josh Griffith to address a cyberbullying storyline. The character was introduced by Griffith for a storyline about cyberbullying with Summer Newman (Hunter King). On the storyline, Griffith said: "Summer is in such a screwed-up state over the divorce of her parents that she misguidedly decides to hurt Ronan by hurting this kid he cares so much about. She uses her phony online persona called 'Brittni' to form a relationship with Jamie and draw information out of him — deeply personal and hurtful stuff about his past troubles with the law — and then she blasts it out to everyone on FacePlace. She'll also be using texting and instant messaging to disparage him further. She realizes he's a kid who's had a really terrible life and that she's doing things to him he doesn't deserve. But, at that point, it's way too late. The tiger is out of the cage." On the topic of the storyline's slated duration on the soap, Griffith stated: The bullying will continue for a couple of months before it reaches a powerful climax. It will then spin into a whole other direction involving Fen Baldwin (Max Ehrich) and his parents Michael (Christian LeBlanc), who is the district attorney, and Lauren (Tracey E. Bregman). This is more than just a cautionary tale about bullying and the dangerous consequences it has for our young characters. This will have huge ramifications for their families." Polo departed on February 22, 2013, after a four-month stint.

Jamie was first seen meeting with Ronan Malloy, and Summer Newman falsely assumed they were father and son. Ronan explained that Jamie has a minor criminal record and he is mentoring him to get back on his feet. Because Summer believed Ronan destroyed her parents' marriage, Summer befriended Jamie on a social networking site, operating under the alias "Brittni". Her friend Fen Baldwin was against the idea. When Jamie revealed to "Brittni" that he broke into his father and stepmother's house and trashed it, Summer took this information and exposed it online, resulting in Jamie distancing himself from "Brittni". Summer then said that what he did made him a loser, and Jamie showed the email to Ronan who revealed to Summer's mother that he believes she is involved somehow. However, after Ronan moved to Washington D.C., Fen's father Michael Baldwin (Christian LeBlanc) began looking out for Jamie, making Fen jealous. This lead him to send harassing and threatening text messages to Jamie via a pre-paid cell phone. Eventually, Jamie was forced to leave the group home he was living in. Michael offered for him to stay with his family, making Fen even more rebellious; he stole one of his mother's expensive decorations and put it in Jamie's backpack to frame him for stealing it. Jamie ran away and began staying on a rooftop, where Fen took pictures of Jamie with the decoration. The boys began to struggle and Jamie was found face down in the snow on the surface below the roof. He accused Fen of pushing him off and Michael believed Jamie over his own son, even after the police arrested him. Jamie then attempted to commit suicide by jumping off the same roof but was stopped by Paul Williams (Doug Davidson), to whom he admitted that Fen did not push him but he knew that it was he who was cyberbullying him. Fen was exonerated for the crime, and Jamie was sent to live with Ronan in Washington D.C.

== Alex Chavez ==
Alex Chavez
- The Young and the Restless character
- Portrayed by: Ignacio Serricchio
- Duration: 2012–14
- First appearance: December 7, 2012
- Last appearance: January 10, 2014
- Created by: Josh Griffith
- Introduced by: Jill Farren Phelps
In-universe information
- Occupation: Detective
- Sisters: Adriana Stone

Alejandro "Alex" Chavez first appeared on December 7, 2012, portrayed by Ignacio Serricchio. His casting in the role was announced by multiple sources in October 2012; he was to portray a New York City detective who "harbors a big secret".

Serricchio described his character as having a very dry sense of humor, and "is also direct and to the point". According to Serricchio, "He wants information and he's going to get it. He reads people, knows when they're lying and enjoys watching them try to make things up." The character often comes off very sarcastic." Serricchio had previously worked with executive producer Jill Farren Phelps when she executive produced General Hospital, where he portrayed Diego Alcazar. In an interview with Soaps In Depth, Serricchio revealed that he had previously auditioned for Phelps's most recent project, Hollywood Heights, but he was "too old" to fit into the cast. Phelps contacted him several months later with idea for the role of Alex. The initial casting announcement said that Alex would have a secret; when asked about the "secret," Serricchio explained that "anything could happen". He stated: "He's trying to find somebody. He's working on a case and comes in because he believes there's a couple of people in town that have kept in touch with this girl he's trying to find." Serricchio revealed that the producers were keeping him in the dark about any possible connections his character may have.

Alex arrives in Genoa City and asks Kevin Fisher (Greg Rikaart) about Noah Newman (Robert Adamson). He later questions Noah about his ex-girlfriend from New York City, Adriana Stone (Jhoanna Flores). Adriana had previously sent Noah a duffel bag full of cash money in the mail, and told him to "keep it safe". Kevin and his wife Chloe Mitchell (Elizabeth Hendrickson), struggling with financial issues, overheard about the missing money and decided to break into Noah's home and steal it. Alex kept pressuring Noah about telling the truth, revealing that Adriana is in fact his younger sister. Adriana later stole the money back but was stopped by Alex, who took the money and returned it. Paul Williams (Doug Davidson) later gave Alex a job working for the police department and he began dating Abby Newman (Melissa Ordway).

== Mason Wilder ==
Mason Wilder, played by Lamon Archey, first appeared on December 12, 2012, as the nephew of Sarge Wilder (Darnell Williams). His casting in the recurring role was announced in October 2012 by Entertainment Weekly. In January 2014, Archey finished his stint with The Young and the Restless.

Mason arrives at Newman Enterprises for his interview and is mistaken by Phyllis Newman (Michelle Stafford) for Matt Merrick, an investor. He eventually reveals that he is Sarge's nephew and Jack Abbott (Peter Bergman) hires him as his new assistant. Mason begins to secretly give Victor Newman information on the interworkings at Newman. Mason meets with Victor where reveals that he has degrees in economics and international business and that he views Jack as a spoiled rich kid that had everything handed to him where as Victor earned everything on his own and Mason wants to learn from Victor. Mason agrees to give Victor the information he needs to retake control of Newman Enterprises in return for a better position once Victor is in charge again.

== Others ==
Date(s)	Character	Actor	Information
September 10–24, 2012	Moran	Graham Shiels	Moran first appeared as a dock worker in Los Angeles where Victor Newman, who had lost his memory, had taken a job. When Victor, believing his name was "Christian", wanted to fight the management for better working conditions, Moran was seen talking suspiciously on the phone to someone about a plan. In reality, they were planning an explosion to kill "Christian" so he would leave the management alone. Sister Celeste, a nun with a neighboring homeless mission, declared to everyone that "Christian" had died in the explosion when he had really survived so that the management and Moran would back off. Victor regained his memory and then returned to Genoa City.
November 8–21, 2012	Eddie G.	Blake Gibbons	Eddie G. was first mentioned when Billy Abbott (Billy Miller) received a text message from him, saying they had "much to talk about". Eddie was then revealed to be from Billy's gambling days and he didn't bother to pay him his debt because he was in prison at the time. However, he has since been released, and Billy discovered that Eddie was holding his wife, Victoria Newman (Amelia Heinle) captive, and he will continue to do so unless Billy gives him $2,000,000. If he calls the police, Eddie threatened to kill Victoria. However, she was able to convince him to let her out, where he revealed to her that he had a son, Tommy, that he couldn't contact. Victoria promised to find him for Eddie if he let her go. She then attempted to call the police, and Eddie handcuffed her to a couch. Afterward, Eddie was shot dead by his employer, who revealed that Eddie was working for him and he would get a part of the two million. Victoria was later rescued by Billy and her brother Nicholas Newman (Joshua Morrow).
