= Summer Newman =

- The Young and the Restless character
- Allison Lanier as Summer Newman
- Portrayed by: Elara and Rhea Kerwin (2006–2008); Bianca and Chiara D'Ambrosio (2008); Sophia and Angelia Hert (2008–2009); Samantha Bailey (2009–2012); Lindsay Bushman (2012); Hunter King (2012–2022); Bayley Corman (2018); Allison Lanier (2022–2025)
- Duration: 2006–2016; 2018–2025
- First appearance: December 12, 2006
- Last appearance: May 2, 2025
- Created by: Lynn Marie Latham, Kay Alden and Scott Hamner
- Introduced by: Lynn Marie Latham and Josh Griffith (2006); Maria Arena Bell (2012); Mal Young (2018); Bradley Bell (2021); Anthony Morina and Josh Griffith (2022)
- Crossover appearances: The Bold and the Beautiful
- Hunter King as Summer Newman
In-universe information
- Other names: Brittni; Summer Travers; Summer Ann Newman; Summer Abbott
- Occupation: Creative Director; Business Executive; Marketing employee; Business Intern; Student; Camp Counselor; Model; Socialite
- Family: Newman
- Father: Nicholas Newman
- Mother: Phyllis Summers
- Half-brothers: Daniel Romalotti; Noah Newman; Christian Newman (legal)
- Half-sisters: Cassie Newman (adoptive); Faith Newman
- Husband: Austin Travers (2014–2015); Kyle Abbott (2019, 2021–2024)
- Adoptive sons: Harrison Abbott
- Grandfathers: Victor Newman; George Summers
- Grandmothers: Nikki Newman; Lydia Callahan
- Uncles: Dylan McAvoy; John Abbott III; Adam Newman
- Aunts: Victoria Newman; Abby Newman; Avery Bailey Clark
- Nieces: Lucy Romalotti
- First cousins: Eve Howard; Reed Hellstrom; Johnny Abbott (adoptive); Connor Newman; Katie Newman; Christian Newman; Dominic Abbott Newman Chancellor

Summer Newman is a fictional character from The Young and the Restless, an American soap opera on the CBS network. Created by head writers Lynn Marie Latham and Kay Alden, the role was most recently portrayed by Allison Lanier, from 2022 to 2025. The character was introduced during the episode airing on December 19, 2006, as the daughter of Phyllis Summers (Michelle Stafford) and Nicholas Newman (Joshua Morrow), but for one year was believed to be the daughter of Jack Abbott (Peter Bergman) because of Sharon Newman, Nick's former wife, tampering with the paternity test results.

The role was first portrayed by a series of child actors, including Samantha Bailey. In 2012, the character was rapidly aged to a teenager, with actress Lindsay Bushman assuming the role. However, Bushman was let go months into her debut and replaced by Hunter King. Summer was later involved in a cyberbullying plot with Fenmore Baldwin (Max Ehrich) and Jamie Vernon (Daniel Polo).

Bailey has received critical acclaim for her portrayal, which has garnered her a Young Artist Award. King has also received critical acclaim for her portrayal, which has garnered nominations for a Young Artist Award and two Daytime Emmy Awards. King won the Daytime Emmy Award for Outstanding Younger Actress in a Drama Series in 2014 and 2015 for her role as Summer.

== Casting ==
"Jill brought me over there. I never auditioned for Y&R. Jill [who had worked with Hunter on Hollywood Heights] just called me. As I was coming off the plane from Florida with a friend, Jill called and said, "Do you want to come work on Y&R and play Summer? I was like, "Yeah." She said, "Okay. You start in two days." I came in and replaced the old Summer [Lindsay Bushman] in the middle of a huge storyline, where she had gotten into a car accident and hit Chelsea, her aunt, and killed her baby. I came in in the middle of that, as Summer was waking up in the hospital. It was very intimidating coming into such a huge storyline, but everybody was really helpful. I got into it very quickly."

— Hunter King, speaking of her casting on The Young and the Restless.

The role was initially portrayed by various sets of twins. They included Elara and Rhea Kerwin (nieces of director James Kerwin) from December 29, 2006, to June 20, 2008, Bianca and Chiara D'Ambrosio from July 22 to November 12, 2008, and Sophia and Angelia Hert until 2009. The character was then rapidly aged for the first time, with child actress Samantha Bailey assuming the role on June 9, 2009. Bailey made her final appearance on May 4, 2012. On May 11, 2012, it was announced the Lindsay Bushman had been cast in the role of the teenage Summer. Bushman made her first appearance on June 8, 2012, on a recurring basis. Bushman had a small bit role on General Hospital as a young Kate Howard in a flashback. Bushman revealed that she got the audition thanks to her agent and booked the role after a few callbacks and chemistry reads. With the installation of new executive producer Jill Farren Phelps, rumors began to circulate that a lot of cast members were in danger of being released or replaced.

Nelson Branco of TV Guide Canada announced the news of Bushman's departure in his magazine, Soap Opera Uncensored in September 2012. Bushman's tweet in response to her firing hinted that she would be replaced by Hunter King formerly of Hollywood Heights, which was also run by Griffith and Phelps. Bushman expressed her frustrations about being replaced on Twitter, saying: "The Young and the Restless is being invaded by Hollywood Heights", referring to Robert Adamson joining the cast as Kevin Schmidt's replacement. King began taping on September 20, immediately after the announcement about Bushman's departure. King made her debut on a recurring status on October 15, 2012. King revealed that she got a voice mail from executive producer Jill Farren Phelps shortly after getting off a flight. Phelps offered her the role and said she would start working in just two days. King admitted that she felt pressure because she stepped into the role during such a critical storyline but said the encouragement from fans really helped. In March 2013, after six months on a recurring status, King was placed on contract. She stated she was "so excited" and that she had been "waiting and waiting" for a contract because she "loves working with everybody on the show".

On June 3, 2016, Deadline reported that King reverted to recurring status with the soap, due to being upgraded to a series regular on Life in Pieces. King last appeared on December 16, 2016. On May 23, 2018, TVLine announced King's full-time return; her return aired on June 4, 2018. Due to King's commitment to Life In Pieces, the role was temporarily recast with actress Bayley Corman, who aired from October 1 to 4, 2018. King temporarily left the show on November 29, 2018, and returned a few months later on January 29, 2019. In January 2021, a crossover event between The Young and the Restless and The Bold and the Beautiful was announced involving King’s character along with the B&B characters of Wyatt Spencer and Flo Fulton. King’s appearances on The Bold and the Beautiful aired January 18 and 19, 2021.

In July 2021, speculation over King’s status with the show arose. One month later, King, alongside Mealor, made her last appearance on August 6, 2021. King and Mealor would briefly return to the show, making their appearances from October 12 to 15 of the same year. King made subsequent appearances on December 24, 2021, and February 21, 2022. Two months after King's final appearance, it was announced Allison Lanier had been cast in the role of Summer; she made her debut on May 17. Former General Hospital actors Lexi Ainsworth and Kristen Alderson auditioned for the role prior to Lanier's casting.

On April 30, 2025, Lanier announced her exit from the role, citing her decision to "grow in a different direction". Her final episode aired May 2.

== Development ==
=== Characterization ===
With the decision to age the character, Summer was described as "fun" and "feisty," and the "typical" teenager. Bushman said that Summer would definitely be a trouble maker much like her mother. Though Summer is definitely like her mom, "she has a bit more morals" like her father and often disapproves when her mother does something wrong. When comparing Summer to her former Hollywood Heights role, Adriana Masters, whom she described as a "mean girl," King explained that there are a lot of factors in Summer's life that lead her to trouble. King described the character as "sweet" but also a little "rebellious." When compared to Adriana, King said Summer is a bit more "softhearted." However, King said that it helped that she was still a teenager herself, and explained that Summer like most teenagers can go "0 to 100 in your range of emotions." According to King, Summer can be very "angsty and stubborn" but also at times, Summers begins to open and shows vulnerability.

=== Teenage years and cyber bullying ===
In April 2012, it was announced that the role of Summer would be rapidly aged along with Fenmore Baldwin, the son of Michael Baldwin (Christian LeBlanc) and Lauren Fenmore (Tracey E. Bregman). The two child characters would be rapidly aged to teenagers. Because of who their parents are, MSN Entertainment stated that Summer and Fenmore's new lives as teenagers would definitely have great story potential. Bushman responded, "You get what you give, right?" referring to Summer's parents, mainly her mother often causing trouble for everyone. Summer reacts to her parents transgressions by acting out including trying to drink vodka with Fenmore (Max Ehrich). However, according to Bushman, Phyllis's actions push Summer to such extremes. If her life was stable, Summer would not find reasons to act out. Her mother's affair with Ronan Malloy (Jeff Branson) is what justifies actions in her mind. Bushman said that at Summer's age, it is difficult to deal with an unstable family and all Summer's knows how to do is act out to get attention. The recast occurred at the peak of Summer's rebellion storyline which culminates in Summer causing a car accident which leads to her uncle Adam Newman (Michael Muhney) and his wife Chelsea (Melissa Claire Egan) miscarrying their unborn child.

In November 2012, Summer was involved in a storyline where she would create a fake online persona, "Brittni" on a social media website to get information from Jamie Vernon (Daniel Polo), a boy being mentored by Genoa City cop Ronan Malloy (Jeff Branson) who was involved with Phyllis. Speaking on the show's cyber bully plot, head-writer Joshua Griffith stated: "Summer is in such a screwed-up state over the divorce of her parents that she misguidedly decides to hurt Ronan by hurting this kid he cares so much about [sic] She uses her phony online persona called 'Brittni' to form a relationship with Jamie and draw information out of him — deeply personal and hurtful stuff about his past troubles with the law — and then she blasts it out to everyone on FacePlace. She'll also be using texting and instant messaging to disparage him further." Simultaneously, Summer starts really getting to know Jamie, and "She realizes he's a kid who's had a really terrible life and that she's doing things to him he doesn't deserve," explained head writer, Josh Griffith in an interview with TV Guide. Summer even uses Fenmore's crush on her to get him to go along with her plan to hurt Ronan by hurting Jamie. But, when Fen becomes aware of Summer's growing soft spot for Jamie, he gets jealous which leads to Jamie attempting suicide. Summer feels sorry for her actions when she realizes that Jamie comes from a broken home just like she does. Summer stops the attacks and tries to support Jamie instead of making matters worse. Summer realizes what she did wrong and King hoped viewers would see that Summer was making progress.

=== Paternity ===
I thought that was the truth until they exposed what happened. I didn't find out the truth until the script came. They're like, "You have to wait and see." For a while I was like, "Oh, my gosh! This is huge. He's not my dad." I was getting really into it. Then I saw what happened. I was reading and they left like a cliff note right at the end of one of the scripts about what Sharon did. I was sitting in my dressing room in disbelief, like, "How could she do that to me? This is awful. This is way bad." I took it very close to heart.

I'm actually really excited. I'm very curious as to how they're going to play it out with Summer. I'm sure she's still going to have the close bond that she now has with Jack. I'm excited to play it as an actress and to see how it all plays out as a fan.

— Hunter King, on Summer's paternity test and Sharon switching the results.

In a 2010 interview with TV Guide, Morrow openly discussed his strong belief that Summer was not Nick's child due to the fact that Nick was suffering from amnesia at the time. Though the actor himself questioned Summer's paternity, it seemed nothing would come of his speculation. In October 2012, Bushman hinted that she would not be opposed to a potential romance with Kyle Abbott (then Blake Hood). In February 2013, King's version of Summer is scripted as being 18 years old, and the character has developed a major crush on Kyle. Nick's immediate disapproval hinted that there was more to his disapproval then just the slight age difference between the two characters. Because Nick is the only person to see the test results, many viewers have begun to speculate that Jack could indeed be Summer's biological father. Summer's crush on Kyle reminds them of the possibility that they could be brother and sister. With the installation of Josh Griffith as head writer, in addition to Nick's adamant disapproval of Summer's crush on Kyle, Jack even brings up the night he helped deliver Summer in the elevator. According to Griffith, Nick is so protective because he knows about Jack's playboy history during his younger years. He stated: "Nick's worried that Summer is going to get involved with someone who could break her heart." Despite Griffith's explanation, King herself questioned Summer's paternity; "I ask Josh everyday, 'Whose daughter am I?" Though Griffith does not confirm or deny anything, he explained that anything is possible.

In May 2013, Nick takes a look at the paternity test results from 2006, this time showing viewers that the results were inconclusive. The storyline coincides with the memorial of the death of Nick's daughter, Cassie Newman (Camryn Grimes), and he visits her grave and admits that he is terrified about losing another daughter. Joshua Morrow admitted in an interview with TV Guide that the writers make it clear that Nick did not intend to do anything wrong. He stated that Nick "refused to do another test". Morrow admits that Nick may have never thought about the possibility of Jack being Summer's father again had Summer not fallen so hard for Kyle to point where she admits that she would like to lose her virginity to him. He said that "people don't know what to think" of Nick's "threatening Kyle" and reasons to "ground Summer". On May 27, 2013, Morrow did an interview TV Buzz which confirmed that Summer is indeed Jack's daughter, and according to the actor, Nick is terrified of Summer's reaction. However, months later it was revealed that the paternity test results were actually switched by Nick's ex-wife Sharon Newman (Sharon Case), while she was off her bipolar medication, in a ploy to win Nick back, meaning that he is in fact Summer's biological father after all. Sharon's secret was yet to be revealed. Speaking of the forthcoming reveal, King stated, "I'm very curious as to how they're going to play it out with Summer. I'm sure she's still going to have the close bond that she now has with Jack."

== Storylines ==
Around the time Summer is conceived, Nicholas Newman (Joshua Morrow) is grieving the loss of his adopted daughter, Cassie Newman (Camryn Grimes), the victim of a car accident. With his marriage to wife Sharon (Sharon Case) falling apart, Nick begins an affair with Jack Abbott (Peter Bergman)'s girlfriend, Phyllis Summers (Michelle Stafford) in December 2005. Despite the affair, there is still a possibility that the unborn child could be Jack's. They order a paternity test but the actual copy of the results is only viewed by Nick, who announces that he is Summer's father and marries Phyllis. Summer is born in an elevator at Newman Enterprises and delivered by Jack Abbott during an ice storm on December 19, 2006.

As infants, Summer and Fenmore are abducted by Sheila Carter (Stafford) who had gotten plastic surgery to look like Phyllis. Fortunately, Summer and Fen survive. A few years later, when Phyllis is sent to prison, Summer becomes ill and must move in with Nick. Two years later, Summer ends up in the hospital when Patty Williams (Stacy Haiduk) gives her a kiss after eating a peanut butter cookie. Phyllis is accused of trying to kill Summer to win back Nick. Summer goes into anaphylactic shock, and is left comatose. When she wakes up, Summer has the mindset of a toddler due to brain swelling and trouble breathing. She undergoes therapy in Switzerland, and later returns a recovered young girl. After appearing sporadically for several years, Summer (Lindsay Bushman) becomes a moody teenager, and develops a friendship with Fenmore (Max Ehrich). She is briefly employed as a camp counselor and becomes intertwined with her mother's past. When Phyllis is accused of the attempted murder of Christine Blair (Lauralee Bell) and Paul Williams (Doug Davidson), Summer believes her mother is innocent and confronts Christine over the matter. However, when Phyllis begins going to extremes to cover up her actions, going so far as making up a "fake" affair with Ronan Malloy, Summer's parents cannot tell her the truth, leading her to rebel by attempting to pour vodka into a drink in a public place. Phyllis' lies become too much for Nick to handle, so he moves out and Summer goes with him. She is then convinced to make repairs in her relationship with her mother, only to walk in on Phyllis and Ronan actually having sex. Afterward, she bashes Ronan's car and gets arrested, and is grounded by Nick. Later she sneaks out of the house with Fenmore where they share a kiss. Summer returns for her mother's trial, and expresses her hatred for Phyllis. She then had an array of emotions while driving, leading to a collision with Adam and Chelsea Newman.

Following the car crash, Summer (Hunter King) quickly recovers, however the accident causes Chelsea to miscarry her unborn child, leaving Summer guilt ridden. As payback for Ronan ruining her family, Summer joins a social network under the alias "Brittni," whom she uses to romance Jamie, a boy who is being mentored by Ronan. "Brittni" instant messages Jamie over the internet and gets him to reveal the crimes he committed and how he met Ronan and in turn posts them all over the internet to embarrass Jamie, and Ronan by extension. However, Summer begins to feel sorry for Jamie and decides to stop tormenting Jamie; however a jealous Fen continues and his actions lead to Jamie's suicide attempt. After the fall out, Summer does her best to rebuild her life and starts crushing on Kyle Abbott, son of her mother's current boyfriend and ex-husband, Jack. Nick is absolutely against the relationship but Summer continues to do things to get Kyle's attention. She also starts working as an intern at Jabot Cosmetics, Jack's company where Kyle also works. Summer seems to be winning Kyle over when she is hired as a model for Jabot's fashion division and to complicate matters further, she and Phyllis move into the Abbott mansion. Instead of going to prom with Fen, she and best friend Courtney (Kelli Goss) throw a party at Phyllis's penthouse; when Fen kisses Summer on a dare, Summer tricks Kyle into coming to her rescue. Kyle admits that a relationship with Summer would not be so bad much to Nick's dismay. Summer plans to lose her virginity to Kyle on the night of her graduation and Phyllis tries to talk her out of it, but doesn't go through with it. For the years following Summer's birth, speculation arose that Jack was in fact Summer's father, not Nick. In the summer of 2013, it was revealed that the paternity test conducted in 2006 was inconclusive. A second paternity test was run by Nick and the results show that Jack is Summer's father. However, Sharon now wants Nick back, and tampers with the test results, allowing everyone to believe Jack is now the father of Summer. Phyllis ultimately hears Sharon confessing to this at Cassie's grave, resulting in an altercation between the two and ending with Phyllis falling down a flight of stairs.

Following Phyllis' accident, Summer begins working in modeling. Esmeralda (Briana Nicole Henry), a longtime model, interacts with Summer at a Jabot Cosmetics photo shoot, and afterward offers her the phone number of her drug dealer for energy pills. Eventually, Summer takes three pills in order to stay awake during the shoot after waking up early. Summer, who begins to breathe heavily, leaves the shoot to get air. Summer's breathing begins to get worse so she calls Fenmore, who breaks his house arrest to find her. Fenmore shows up at the shoot looking for Summer where he interacts with Sharon and Esmeralda. Sharon and Esmeralda went down the stairwell looking for her where they find Summer at the bottom of the stairwell. At the hospital, the doctor tells Sharon, Jake and Nick that she was having Cardiac arrest episodes and suffering from High output heart failure. Summer comes with support from Nick and eventually returns home. Afterwards, Summer visits Fenmore in jail after he was arrested for breaking house arrest.

In the absence of Phyllis, Summer began connecting with her aunt, Avery Bailey Clark (Jessica Collins).

In the summer of 2014, Summer began to developed a serious romantic relationship with her aunt Avery Bailey Clark's camera man Austin Travers (Matthew Atkinson). After Austin reveals to Summer that he kidnapped her aunt and accidentally shot police chief Paul Williams, Summer insists on helping him get to the Canada–US border where they became fugitives, however Austin leaves Summer behind and returns to Genoa City and turns himself in. After turning himself in to the police, Summer finds a lawyer to represent him, even asking Avery to do it before Leslie Michaelson takes the case and Summer bails him out. Summer and Austin ultimately elope so Summer wouldn't be forced to testify against him in court. In conclusion, Summer decides she wants to have a traditional wedding in a church with family and friends, much to the displeasure of Summer's family members and friends, in particularly Jack who attempts to get the marriage null and void, by even going as far as having her arrested. However, thanks to the support from Sharon and Jack's girlfriend Kelly Andrews, Nick and Jack both come to the wedding which is broken up by the police and attempt to arrest Austin. After convincing Avery, her uncle Dylan and Paul agree to not press charges leading Austin only receiving a fine to pay, which Summer pays from her trust fund.

Tension quickly rose on their union as Summer became more jealous when Austin develops a friendship with Cassie's twin sister Mariah Copeland, whom she strongly dislikes. When Summer's mother recovers from her coma, Summer introduces Austin as her friend, upsetting Austin with Summer claiming that the doctor is requiring her family not to give upsetting or shocking information to Phyllis. Phyllis learns from Summer that the two are "engaged" and is enraged; but not as enraged when she learns the two are married and Austin is a felon. Phyllis sees the relationship is blossoming so Phyllis agrees to ease up and leave them be. Months later, it is revealed to Summer that Sharon switched her paternity results. Summer and Austin once again face relationship problems, when Summer learns Mariah kissed Austin. On Valentine's Day 2015, Abby Newman invites Summer, Austin, Mariah, Kevin Fisher, Fenmore, Noah, and Courtney to the Abbott Cabin. After Fenmore spiked Abby's punch everyone falls asleep. After Kevin wakes up, so does everyone else to discover that Austin is missing. Kevin searches outside in an intense snowstorm and finds nothing. While the group is talking about Austin's possible whereabouts Austin falls out of a wardrobe and after Courtney (a police officer) tries to revive a unresponsive Austin, she declares that he is dead.

Later it is discovered that Austin was having an affair with Summer's aunt Abby, leaving Summer heartbroken and confused as she is grieving for her husband and mad that he cheated on her. Kyle also has come back to town and revealed that he first came back to confront Austin about his affair with Abby leaving Summer angry that Kyle didn't first tell her. However, Summer forgives Kyle and he continues comforting her over her loss. Then the person who killed Austin begins threatening Summer, Kyle, Noah, Courtney, and Abby. As time goes by, they keep looking for the killer which causes the killer to strike again – this time killing Courtney on her wedding day before she was to marry Noah. This leaves Summer heartbroken as she has now lost her husband and best friend, and so Kyle remains by her side to help her in her grieving. Summer suspects Sharon as the killer, which causes a rift between her and Noah. Later, Summer attends a party with Kyle to get her mind off of everything. After the party at her house, Summer talks about Courtney then tells Kyle that she can't keep dragging Kyle into her misery but Kyle says that that's what he is here for and that they were family for a little while at least but Summer says she doesn't look at him and see a brother and Kyle says he's not and he never was. Summer looks at Kyle and says no you weren't. Kyle and Summer look deeply at each other and then kiss, which leads to them making love for the first time. Afterwards Summer tells Kyle that it feels so good to be with him. They both also say it feels so natural being with each other even after they were told that it was unnatural. Summer says that it was unfair that they were kept apart because of Sharon's lie. Then Noah sees them and gets mad because Kyle took advantage of Summer. After Noah leaves Kyle tells Summer not to feel ashamed, that what they did isn't wrong and that Noah is just grieving. Later Summer and Noah make up and he apologizes. Sharon is arrested soon after as evidence points to her. Noah defends her but Summer continues to believe she is guilty.

Summer returns to Genoa City in June 2018, much to the surprise of Phyllis and Billy. Immediately, she makes her presence known in Genoa City, only to eventually be arrested for charges of felony theft auto; when bailed out, she explains she believed the car to be a gift from "Pax," with whom she was having affair with. Summer returns to town with resent towards her mother. Summer takes a liking in Billy Abbott (although he is with her mother), and begins to make subtle, but unpleasant plays for him, such as wearing lingerie around the house, and getting Billy to give into his gambling addiction. Summer suspects trouble in Billy and Phyllis’s relationship, and enlists the help of Kyle Abbott to figure out what it is. Summer and Kyle initially suspect that her and Kyle’s father Jack Abbott slept together, however it is later revealed that Phyllis slept with Nick while her and Billy were on a "break". Summer uses this to her advantage, and makes Nick give her a payout. Later, Summer and her mother fight about Billy, and Summer confesses to having feelings for him, as they kissed. Phyllis slaps Summer, which sends Summer to find Billy. However, Phyllis sends a text message using Billy’s I.D, for Summer to meet him on a boat. Summer takes the bait, and gets herself stuck on the boat. Weeks later, Summer accidentally exposes the secret to Mariah Copeland, who later tells Sharon of the affair, causing her to end her relationship to Nick, and Billy ending his relationship to Phyllis. In an act of retaliation against Phyllis, Billy sleeps with Summer, however he soon confesses to it being just an act against Phyllis. Summer temporarily moves to Dubai but returns shortly, which making Kyle torn between Summer and Lola Rosales.

In 2020, Kyle and Summer find their way back together, no longer being able deny the attraction their love and attraction. In 2020, Kyle gave Summer a special gift, a part of Dina's emerald necklace. Summer always had a close and special relationship with Dina, Kyle's grandmother. And in 2021, Kyle found out he had a son with Tara Locke, and Tara tries to blackmail Summer out of Kyle's life. When Tara was exposed, Kyle appreciated Summer's sacrifice for Kyle to continue to be a part of Harrison's life. Tara is sent to prison on embezzlement charges. Kyle and Harrison moved to Milan to be with Summer, and Kyle and Summer got married in Milan. And Kyle and Summer are raising Harrison together becoming wonderful parents, and thriving in their careers while becoming a stronger couple together.

== Reception ==
Jillian Bowe of Zap2it was surprised by the decision to age both Summer and Fenmore at the same time. Soaps In Depth said, "A wave of SORAS has hit Genoa City!" in response to the announcement that Bushman had joined the cast. TV Source Magazine said, "Don’t they grow up fast?", referring to the genre's knack for aging young character's very quickly. Dan J. Kroll of the website Soap Central commented, "Two more Genoa City residents growing up too fast." The series had just rapidly aged Kyle Abbott and Ricky Williams. Michael Fairman said aging the characters would help to "beef up" the show's summer storylines. Bushman's acting coach took to Twitter to congratulate the actress on booking the role. When Bushman was let go from the soap opera, Jamey Giddens, also of Zap2it, said: "Another blonde actress who plays a member of The Young and the Restless' fictional Newman clan has been let go", in reference to Marcy Rylan's recent firing from the role of Abby Newman. Giddens also recommended another Hollywood Heights actress, Brittany Underwood, for the role. The news of King's casting did not come as a surprise due to Phelps and Griffith's ties to Hollywood Heights and previous casting decisions. Zap2it referred to Bushman's portrayal of Summer as "annoying" following the announcement of her departure.

King's performance received praise very early on. King ranked at number one on Zap2it's list of "Top 5 Soap Opera Newcomers". King was applauded for giving "a dose of much-need, angsty teen spirit". The article said King completely transformed the character from "a vapid, little nothing into a pretty little liar", and that King could easily hold her own up against acting veterans. Soap Opera Digest gave King's casting a "Thumbs Up!" and said that the decision was a "winning move". The magazine also applauded Bushman for her "adequate" portrayal of Summer, but said that King "blends the right amount of brooding teen angst and vulnerability to creat a compelling character" that can make viewers angry because of her decisions, but also makes viewers "sympathize with her". The magazine also thought King's skill as an actress made the transition "seamless". Max Ehrich, who portrays Fenmore, said Bushman's ousting was "bitter sweet" but noted that he also enjoyed working with King. King admitted that she has to "clarify that I'm not the character" to fans whenever Summer is being manipulative. Bailey's performance earned her the Young Artist Award for Best Performance in a Daytime TV Series - Young Actress beating Kings's performance in the role. King was also nominated for the Daytime Emmy Award for Outstanding Younger Actress in a Drama Series in 2013, losing out to Kristen Alderson before winning the following year, beating out Alderson, Linsey Godfrey, Kim Matula and Kelly Missal.

Viewers have often questioned Summer's paternity. On March 21, 2013, Zap2it ran a poll asking fans if they believed Summer was an Abbott or a Newman, and an overwhelming 76% (1,928 voters) concluded that Summer was an Abbott.

In 2024, Lanier was shortlisted for the Daytime Emmy Award for Outstanding Supporting Actress in a Drama Series for her role as Summer. Carolyn Hinsey from Soap Opera Digest opined that Summer's 2025 departure was the worst exit of The Young and the Restless that year, believing that the "abrupt end" to Lanier's stint "felt rushed and poorly planned"; she also criticised Summer abandoning Harrison and called her a "bad mom".
