= Fenmore Baldwin =

Fictional character in soap opera

- The Young and the Restless character
- Zach Tinker as Fenmore Baldwin
- Portrayed by: Robbie Tucker (2009–2012); Max Ehrich (2012–2015); Zach Tinker (2018–2023); (and child actors)
- Duration: 2006–2015; 2018–2020; 2023
- First appearance: October 13, 2006
- Last appearance: January 25, 2023
- Created by: Lynn Marie Latham and Kay Alden
- Introduced by: Lynn Marie Latham (2006); Maria Arena Bell (2012); Mal Young (2018); Anthony Morina and Josh Griffith (2023)
In-universe information
- Other names: Fenmore Michael Baldwin
- Occupation: Model; Singer; Songwriter; Waiter; Student
- Family: Baldwin
- Father: Michael Baldwin
- Mother: Lauren Fenmore
- Half-brothers: Scotty Grainger; Dylan Fenmore (legal)
- Grandfathers: River Baldwin; Neil Fenmore
- Grandmothers: Gloria Bardwell; Joanna Manning
- Uncles: Kevin Fisher
- Aunts: Eden Baldwin; Jill Abbott
- First cousins: Phillip Chancellor III; Billy Abbott; Bella Fisher; Miles Fisher

Fenmore Baldwin is a fictional character from The Young and the Restless, an American soap opera on the CBS network. Created by former head writers Lynn Marie Latham and Kay Alden as the son of Michael Baldwin (Christian LeBlanc) and Lauren Fenmore (Tracey Bregman), the character was born during the episode airing on October 13, 2006. Initially portrayed by various child actors, including Robbie Tucker, the character was rapidly aged to a teenager in 2012, with Max Ehrich assuming the role through 2015. In 2018, the role was recast with Zach Tinker.

As a teenager, the character's storylines have included a romance with Summer Newman (Hunter King), as well as a cyberbullying plot with Jamie Vernon (Daniel Polo), which was generally well received by the actors and public. Fenmore has also developed a "dark side", coinciding with teenage angst. Ehrich characterized the character as being at a "vulnerable age", while "trying to find his place in the world". Ehrich's portrayal has received a positive response; Michael Fairman of On-Air On-Soaps described the actor as talented, as well as Luke Kerr of Zap2it praising Ehrich for "mastering the crazy behind-the-eyes element" of the character's relatives. Ehrich's portrayal garnered him four consecutive Daytime Emmy Award nominations between 2013 and 2016.

== Casting ==
The role was first portrayed by three sets of twins, including Avital and Amiel Weiss, Matthew and Riley Esham, and Aiden and Andrew Gonzales over the course of 2006 to 2009. The role was then rapidly aged for the first time when Tucker assumed the role in October 2009. In May 2012, it was announced that the character had been rapidly aged again to a teenager, with Ehrich scheduled to join the cast. He made his debut on June 11, 2012. In an interview with Soap Opera Digest, Ehrich stated that he had gone through a "long audition process", saying: "I got a callback and did a chemistry read with someone, then came back to read with Christian LeBlanc. By the end of that audition, I knew something felt right and that he could be my father." When asked about signing a contract with the series, Ehrich stated: "I'm still on recurring right now. I think it's all relevant to your character and either way, in my book, it's awesome. I would sign, yes, but it'll happen when the time is right." Ehrich last aired on May 18, 2015.

In November 2018, Ehrich announced on Instagram that he'd been asked to reprise the role, however, due to a string of stalking incidents, he could not return; as a result, Zach Tinker was announced as a recast. Tinker debuted in the role on December 3, 2018. Tinker was written out on February 11, 2019. In November 2019, it was reported that Tinker will be returning to the show; airing the week of December 23. On January 13, 2023, it was announced Tinker would reprise the role beginning January 25.

== Development ==
=== Characterization ===
"He's really at this young and vulnerable age. Your hormones are out of control, you're going through so much angst, and everyone Fen has trusted seems to get ripped away [to the point] where he literally has no one to trust. And Fen is someone who has destructive tendencies, so it's very scary. Of course, it can't be intense all the time. You need the peaks and valleys. But I do love playing intense!"

— Ehrich, describing the character's teenage angst and behavior (2013)

When Ehrich first stepped into the role, he stated: "There [are] so many places where they can go with this role. I have just gotten back into Genoa City. It's such a vulnerable age, so really there [are] so many different paths I can go down. And there's so much that can happen. I’m very, very curious to see where they go with it." When asked how he would describe Fenmore, Ehrich said: "He is definitely figuring himself out. You’re on the brink of adulthood. You have to start taking a bit of responsibility. [And] your hormones start kicking in hardcore. So he's definitely going through some stuff." In another interview, he described Fenmore as "trying to find his place in the world", saying: "When Fen first came back, I think he was at a very vulnerable age and was trying to find his place in the world; just really figure out who he is. He has such a strict dad, who just became D.A., so of course his morals are so strong and everything is black and white, right or wrong." Luke Kerr of Zap2it wrote that the character had become "creepy" during his angst and acting out.

=== Teenage angst ===
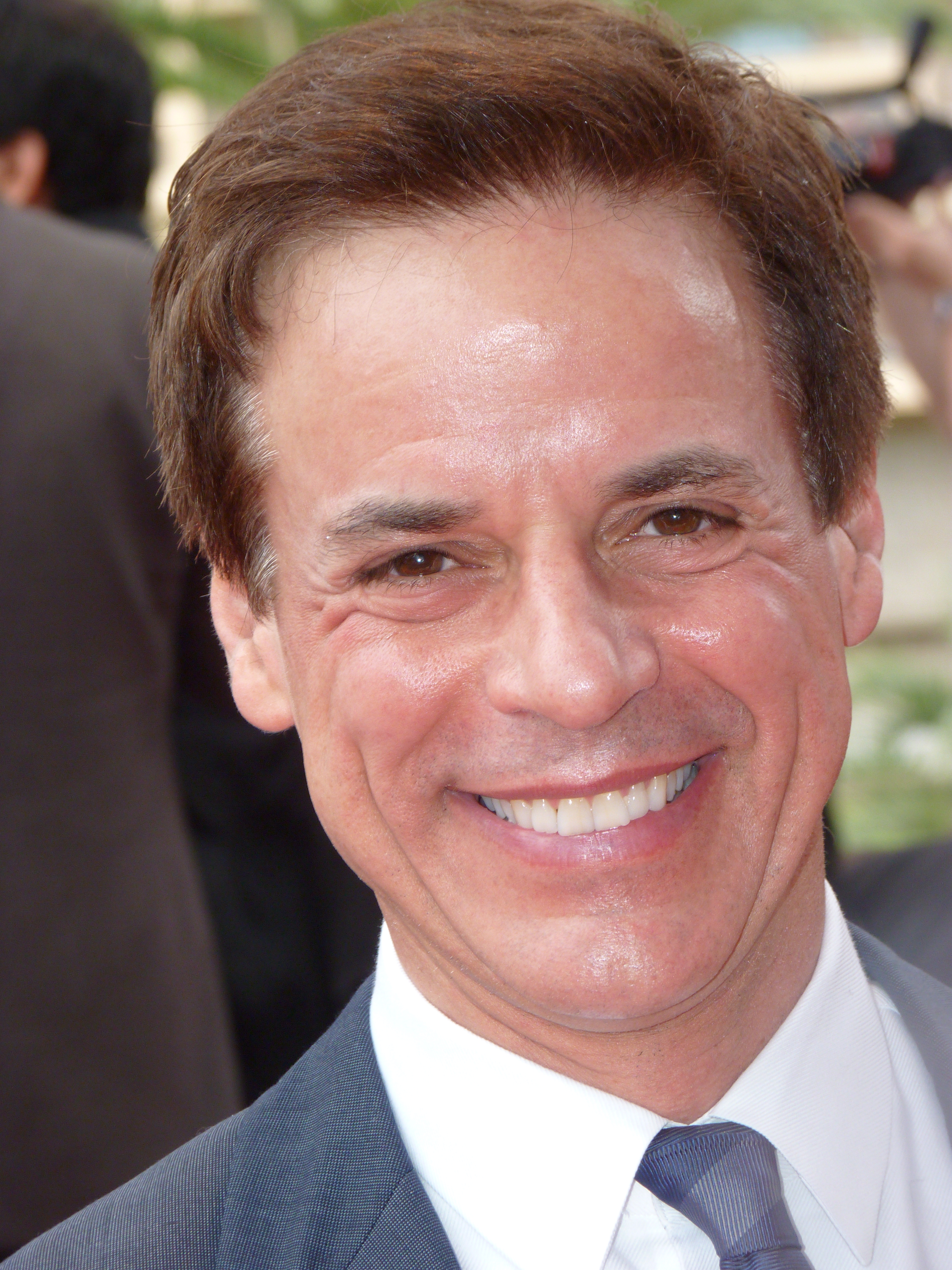
Christian LeBlanc, who portrays the character's father Michael Baldwin, stated that Fenmore's storyline was "really fascinating" and would have a "rippling effect" on the character's entire family.

When Fenmore and female character Summer Newman (Hunter King) were rapidly aged to teenagers at the same time, Deanna Barnert of MSN Entertainment previewed: "These two kids may learn about some of the insane things their parents have done – as fans know, that says a lot!" She also wrote that given who their parents are, "that can only mean trouble". Fenmore has dated Summer, to which Ehrich stated: "Everything he does is for his love for Summer. He has this obsession with her. Every action he does stems from that." In another interview, he stated of their relationship: "I think Fen’s first love is Summer; he falls in love; he’s infatuated with her. She plays games with him, and where it’s going is – will Fen get into her ways, or will he stand his ground? Everything Fenmore does is coming from his love for Summer, so he’s still the same kid, it’s just sometimes love makes you do some crazy thing Fenmore later began to enter a rebellious phase." Tracey Bregman (who portrays his mother Lauren) stated that she "was always hoping they would show the dark side of our child, because both Lauren and Michael have dark sides. That is something they both work hard on to suppress, that comes out now and them." Christian LeBlanc (who portrays his father Michael) stated Michael has "troubled youth to deal with", saying: "It’s the first time on Y&R that such a young storyline has pulled such focus. It’s going to be really fascinating. The whole family gets drawn in. The trouble with Fenmore affects Lauren and Michael. [There’s a] rippling effect, like every good story." The character was later involved in a cyberbullying storyline with Summer and Jamie Vernon (Daniel Polo). Michael Logan of TV Guide previewed the storyline, writing: "Adding fuel to the fire is young Fen Baldwin (Max Ehrich), who is so infatuated with Summer that he becomes her partner in crime — in fact, he takes things a few dangerous steps further once he sees Summer's growing fondness for Jamie." Ehrich liked the plot as he was bullied as a child, stating: "Kids do it out of their own sadness or insecurity, but needless to say that doesn’t matter when you’re a victim of it – you feel so isolated and so alone. To have a storyline that addresses it, it’s like, "This is real; this is what happens". People need to know the truth of what is going on out there."

In another interview, Ehrich expressed more of his opinions on the storyline, stating: "It’s so relevant now and it’s such an epidemic. Just for it to be out there to show that it happens. This is a real issue that needs to be addressed. To be a part of that, and to spread awareness feels so nice because I’ve personally experience bullying and I know many friends who have. Whether people’s reason behind it are good or bad, nonetheless, it affects kids to such an extent especially young, vulnerable kids." Of the character's "dark side", Ehrich stated: "I love playing dark, but justifiably dark. It's never coming from a psychopathic place. First, he got obsessed with Summer, and that caused the bullying storyline, and now he's dealing with his parents' problems and possible divorce. Fenmore's issues come from a place that makes sense. It's interesting, because everyone around him is pretty much lying, and Fen is supposed to be the crazy one. Yet he's actually the truthful one." He also stated that "as an actor, it's fun to go out of control", saying: "As an actor, it’s fun when you’re out of control, and you don’t even know you’re acting. Like, literally, you just escape. And I got to feel that. And I’ve had numerous times on this show where I’ve gotten to be out of control, and it’s a really nice feeling. It’s exhilarating." He also revealed that he had been listening to the music of John Mayer and Bruno Mars to get into Fenmore's head space. Ehrich also conceded that he didn't want Fenmore to go "too far", saying: "He's a really troubled kid who is just trying to find his way in life. He's not evil. I don't think he's asking for too much except for some love and trust. He's on a journey—a long, long journey to find some peace."

== Storylines ==
Lauren Fenmore Baldwin (Tracey E. Bregman) gave birth to Fenmore prematurely, and he was forced to remain in the hospital for a short time. Shortly after his birth, he was kidnapped, along with Phyllis Summers Newman (Michelle Stafford) and her daughter, Summer Newman, by Sheila Carter, who had had cosmetic surgery to look like Phyllis. All are rescued when Lauren tracked down Sheila and shot her. In 2012, Fenmore was sent to stay with his half-brother, Scotty Grainger, in Canada due to Lauren's fear that Daisy Carter (Yvonne Zima), Sheila's daughter, would end up harming him. Months later, Fenmore returns a moody teenager, kindling a friendship with a teenaged Summer. They became close and later began a relationship. When Summer began harassing a boy named Jamie Vernon (Daniel Polo) online, Fenmore was against the idea, but when his father, Michael Baldwin (Christian LeBlanc), began looking out for Jamie, he became jealous and took over the bullying by sending him harassing text messages from a disposable cell phone. Fenmore's jealously continued when Michael and Lauren had Jamie move in with them temporarily. He attempted to frame Jamie for stealing his mother's expensive decoration, and attempted to take pictures of him with the decoration on a rooftop. The boys struggled and Jamie was found face down in the snow below. He accused Fenmore of pushing him, Michael believed Jamie over his own son and he was arrested. However, Jamie later confessed that Fenmore did not push him and he was exonerated. Michael and Lauren's marriage suffered due to the bullying ordeal.

Fenmore was befriended by Carmine Basco (Marco Dapper), the man whom Lauren was having an affair with, while also trying to win over Summer again, who was crushing on Kyle Abbott (Hartley Sawyer). Fenmore asked Summer to their senior prom, and instead of going, Summer threw a party at her mother's penthouse. During a game of truth or dare, Fenmore was dared to kiss Summer, who had text messaged Kyle that she was in trouble. Kyle later punched Fenmore in the face; footage was caught on video and uploaded online, weakening Fenmore's social status. Afterward, he is befriended by Raven (Amanda Leighton); they go to a graduation party, do drugs and talk about their social struggles. When Fenmore discovers Carmine's affair with his mother, he isolates himself from his family and continues to do drugs. Afterward, he asks Carmine to help him obtain more drugs, and while he refuses, he finds Fenmore unconscious in the back of the local restaurant. When he awakens in the hospital, he tells his parents that Carmine gave him the drugs that he overdosed on, but he later confesses that this was a lie. After stealing drugs from the hospital and getting caught, Michael and Lauren send Fenmore to rehab. After being released for an event in which Lauren would be crowned businesswoman of the year, Carmine is shot to death in an alleyway. Fenmore is convinced he murdered Carmine but admits to being high on drugs at the time and can't remember clearly. Michael decides to confess to the murder to protect his family, and he is sent to prison. Knowing that his father did not kill Carmine, Fenmore steals drugs and purposely gets caught so he can be put in prison as well. While in prison, Fenmore tries to make deals with other prisoners to get his father's sentence reduced, as Paul Williams (Doug Davidson) and Christine Blair (Lauralee Bell) try to uncover the truth behind Carmine's death. Michael is later released after Fen confesses to killing Carmine, worrying his parents.

As Paul, Christine and Michael continue to hit dead ends on solving Carmine's murder, Fen announces he wants to confess to a judge and be sentenced prison time; Christine and Lauren however are strongly against it. Just as Fen decides he is going to confess to the judge, Michael discovers that Carmine is in fact alive. He reveals that he was in fact being transported into witness protection the day of the banquet for giving the FBI evidence against another criminal, but he wanted to see Lauren one last time. Fen shot him that night but doctors and medical examiners secretly revived him and sent him into witness protection. He refuses to return to Genoa City to exonerate Fen because of his own safety, so instead Michael films him confessing that he is alive. Michael arrives with the video before Fen can confess, and he is exonerated. After being reunited with his family, Michael and Lauren later mention that Fen had gone to Arizona to visit potential colleges.

== Reception ==
Jillian Bowe of Zap2it was surprised by the decision to age both Fenmore and Summer Newman (Hunter King) at the same time. Omar White-Nobles of TVSource wrote, "Don't they grow up fast?", referring to Soap Opera Rapid Aging Syndrome. Michael Fairman of On-Air On-Soaps wrote that aging the characters would help to "beef up" the soap opera's summer storylines. Roger Newcomb of the website We Love Soaps wondered if the character would "have issues with his parents the way other aged kids on the show have of late". Fairman later stated of Ehrich's portrayal: "Recently, the powers-that-be at Y&R chose to age Lauren and Michael’s tot of a son, Fenmore, to a teenager (another victim of Soap Opera Rapid Aging Syndrome) and with that comes new complex problems for the Baldwins, and as it appears “Fen” may be a chip off the old block ... sort to speak. The talented Max Ehrich was cast as the new Fen, and since he has begun to air in the part he has received high marks, not only from his scene partners, but daytime fans, too." He also called Fenmore's family "one of the most fascinating TV families". Luke Kerr, also of Zap2it, wrote that he "really likes" Ehrich as Fenmore, stating: "He has totally mastered the Baldwin/Fisher crazy behind-the-eyes element of early Michael and Kevin (Greg Rikaart)." Jamey Giddens also wrote of the character's family storyline, saying: "A father hellbent on preventing his son from going down the same unspeakable path he once traveled; a mother who refuses to believe her child could be guilty of the heinous crime he's being accused of committing. No, this isn't the back page copy for Jodi Picoult's next best-selling novel, it's the saga of the Baldwins on The Young and the Restless!"

In 2013, Ehrich received a Daytime Emmy Award nomination for Outstanding Younger Actor in a Drama Series for his portrayal of Fenmore. On the day the actor was informed of his nomination, Ehrich stated: "I’ve been in daydream all day. I feel like I was hit by an electric current." He admitted that it was a "pretty easy choice" choosing which scene to submit for consideration; Ehrich chose a scene where Fenmore tells Jamie that Summer is the one cyberbullying him. He stated that he chose that episode "because that day, I felt this outer body experience. I was not in control at all". Of his nomination, Ehrich stated: "It’s an honor, and it’s something I hope will hit me really soon, because it doesn’t feel real at all!" However, Ehrich lost the award to Days of Our Lives star Chandler Massey for his portrayal of Will Horton.
