= Scotty Grainger =

Fictional character from the American CBS soap opera The Young and the Restless

- The Young and the Restless character
- Daniel Hall as Scotty Grainger
- Portrayed by: Hannah and Jessica Gist (1993–1994); Joseph Tello (1993–1994); Gemini Barnett (1994); Blair Redford (2005–2006); Daniel Hall (2017–2018); (and others)
- Duration: 1991–1994; 2005–2006; 2017–2018
- First appearance: 1991
- Last appearance: January 17, 2018
- Created by: William J. Bell
- Introduced by: William J. Bell and Edward J. Scott (1991); John F. Smith (2005); Mal Young and Sally Sussman Morina (2017)
- Blair Redford as Scotty Grainger
In-universe information
- Other names: Scott Grainger Jr.
- Occupation: Executive at Newman Enterprises; Journalist
- Parents: Scott Grainger Sr.; Lauren Fenmore
- Stepfather: Michael Baldwin
- Half-brothers: Dylan Fenmore (legal); Fenmore Baldwin
- Grandparents: James Grainger; Neil Fenmore; Joanna Manning
- Aunts: Christine Blair; Jill Abbott
- First cousins: Phillip Chancellor III; Billy Abbott

Scotty Grainger is a fictional character from the CBS soap opera The Young and the Restless. He was played by actor Blair Redford from July 2005 until January 2006. In January 2017, Soap Opera Digest announced that Daniel Hall had been recast in the role. In January 2018, Hall was written out of the show, he last aired on January 17.

== Storylines ==
=== 1991–94 ===
In 1989, Lauren Fenmore (Tracey E. Bregman) and Dr. Scott Grainger (Peter Barton) got married, but Sheila Carter (Kimberlin Brown) wanted Scott for herself. She drugged him in order to get herself pregnant, and she and Lauren were both pregnant by Scott at the same time. Scott then divorced Lauren out of obligation to Sheila. Then, Sheila miscarried, but she bought a baby off the black market, and she swapped the child with Lauren's newborn son. She "delivered" Scott Grainger Jr. in 1991, and Lauren raised Sheila's black market baby, Dylan, until he died from meningitis at the age of one year in 1992. Soon after, Sheila's mother, Molly Carter (Marilyn Alex), revealed the truth to Lauren and Scott. The couple were reunited with their son, and they got remarried in 1992. Unfortunately, Scott became terminally ill the same year, and he died shortly after. Lauren then moved to Los Angeles, and she took Scotty with her. Over the next few years, Lauren traveled the world. It was revealed during that time that Scotty spent his childhood in boarding school. Lauren returned to Genoa City in 2001 while Scotty was still in school.

=== 2005–06 ===
After her return, Lauren married Michael Baldwin (Christian LeBlanc) in 2005. Michael soon quizzed Lauren about her rarely mentioned son, Scotty, hopeful that he would attend the wedding, and they could finally meet, but Lauren was evasive. After a failed internet search, Michael's half-brother, Kevin Fisher (Greg Rikaart), called Scotty from Lauren's cell phone, and they traced the boy to Toronto, Ontario, Canada. Michael went to Canada to meet his future stepson, now a 24-year-old college student, working on his master's degree in education with a specialty in creative writing. Scotty, using "Scott" professionally, disclosed that he had never been back to Genoa City since he was a toddler. Still, Lauren visited him often during his stays in boarding school. Scott had always wondered why his mother was so secretive, but he gave up asking a long time ago. Not long after Michael returned to Genoa City, Lauren decided to tell Scott about her impending marriage, but Scott admitted that he had already met Michael. Lauren felt betrayed by Michael, but he later reminded her about how she disliked his family secrets.

After Lauren left Scott's apartment, Sheila Carter walked out of Scott's bedroom. Sheila was taking college courses, and Scott, who looked just like his father, was her tutor. Sheila gave Scott an idea for a novel. Unknown to him, the story was of Sheila and his mother's past, but Sheila made Lauren out to be the evil-doer who stole Sheila's baby when it was really the other way around. Meanwhile, Michael discovered Lauren and Sheila's history, and he visited "Sheila" in a Californian prison for the criminally insane. This woman was not Sheila, but "Sugar" (also played by Kimberlin Brown), who had plastic surgery to look like Sheila. She escaped from prison for two months before turning herself in. Scott came to Genoa City for his mother's wedding and Sheila followed him there in disguise. She soon hooked up with Kevin Fisher's abusive father, "Terrible Tom" Fisher (Roscoe Born).

Not realizing that Sheila was intent on murder, Tom was conned into joining her plot to get back at Lauren by planting a bomb on Lauren and Michael's honeymoon yacht. Lauren was presumed dead, but Tom saved her in time. He kept Lauren and Sheila captive until Lauren convinced him that Sheila was evil. John Abbott (Jerry Douglas) discovered that Lauren was being held hostage, and in his attempt to rescue her, Tom was fatally shot in 2006. Lauren and Sheila worked together to escape from the bomb shelter that they were being held in. Sheila left town after the shelter caved in, and she was severely hurt. Luckily, Lauren came out unscathed, and she reunited with Scott and Michael. Scott decided to stay in Genoa City with his mother, but he soon faded into the background. Several months later in 2006, Lauren revealed that Scott moved back to Toronto.

In 2012, when Daisy Carter, Sheila's daughter, is freed from prison, Lauren feels extremely endangered. She is scared that Daisy will torture her and her family, so she decides to send Fenmore Baldwin, her son with Michael, to live with Scotty until the matter with Daisy is resolved.

=== 2017–18 ===
In July 2018, Scott published an article about the disappearance of J.T. Hellstrom who had been investigating Newman Enterprises for global price-fixing, accusing Victor of getting rid of J.T. and bringing up old suspicions of various enemies who had disappeared.
