= Robbie Tucker =

American actor (born 2001)

- Born: April 5, 2001 (age 25); United States
- Occupation: Actor
- Years active: 2008–present
- Relatives: Jillian Rose Reed (sister)

Robbie Tucker (born April 5, 2001) is an American actor. His best known role to date is that of Fenmore Baldwin on the CBS soap opera The Young and the Restless. Tucker has also starred on other series, such as Criminal Minds, FlashForward and It's Always Sunny in Philadelphia. He has also appeared in the films Prom and Little Fockers.

In 2012, Tucker was nominated at the 33rd Young Artist Awards for his performance in Prom and won for his role in The Young and the Restless.

He is also the brother of actress Jillian Rose Reed.

== Filmography ==
List of acting credits in film and television
Year	Title	Role	Notes
Tasty Time With ZeFronk	2008	Robbie	TV series (Episode: "Dom's Tomato Surprise")
Criminal Minds	2009	Kyle Murphy	TV series (Episode: "A Shade of Gray")
FlashForward	2009	Child #5 / Kid #1	TV series (2 episodes)
The Young and the Restless	2009–2012	Fenmore Baldwin	TV series (30 episodes)
It's Always Sunny in Philadelphia	2010	Young Charlie	TV series (Episode: "A Very Sunny Christmas")
Little Fockers	2010	EHS Tough Kid	
Hop	2011	Kid #1	Uncredited
Losing Control	2011	Robbie	
Prom	2011	Charles Richter	
Shuffle	2011	Young Kevin	
The League	2011	Library Boy / Tiny Tim	TV series (2 episodes)
Pack of Wolves	2011	Albert Oppenheimer	TV movie
Family Weekend	2012	Mickey Smith-Dungy	
Awkward.	2012	Zach	TV series (Episode: "Time After Time")
Sullivan & Son	2013	Josh	TV series (Episode: "Winning Is Everything")
See Dad Run	2013–2014	Fitzy	TV series (9 episodes)
The OA	2016		TV series
