= Rodner Figueroa =

Venezuelan television presenter

Rodner Figueroa (born 1972) is a Venezuelan television show host. Figueroa has hosted shows on Univision, such as El Gordo y La Flaca, Sal y Pimienta, and for Al Rojo Vivo on the Telemundo network.

== Career ==
=== Univision ===
Early in 2015 during a segment on the work of makeup artist Paolo Ballesteros, Figueroa stated multiple times in Spanish that Michelle Obama "looks like a character from the movie Planet of the Apes." His co-hosts contested, but Figueroa made the statement again. Figueroa was subsequently fired by Univision for the comment. After losing his job, Figueroa later publicly apologized about the comments.

=== Telemundo ===
In October 2017, Figueroa joined María Celeste Arrarás on the Telemundo network news program Al Rojo Vivo.

== Personal ==
Figueroa and the man who replaced him as host of Sal y Pimienta, Mexican show host Carlos Calderon, are personal friends. Figueroa stated he is happy that Calderon replaced him. Rodner Figueroa is in a relationship with Ernesto Mathies and publicly acknowledged his homosexuality.
