= Marco Dapper =

American actor and model (born 1983)

Marco Dominic Dapper
- Born: July 9, 1983 (age 43); Hayward, California, U.S.
- Occupations: Actor; model
- Years active: 2006–present

Marco Dominic Dapper (July 9, 1983) is an American actor and model, best known for his role as Carmine Basco on The Young and the Restless (2012–2014). He moved to Los Angeles in 2003, where he has studied acting at Lesly Kahn, Beverly Hills Playhouse, and Baron Brown.

== Early life ==
Dapper was born in Hayward, California.

== Career ==
In 2006, Dapper made his debut as Troy in the sex comedy film Eating Out 2: Sloppy Seconds.

From 2012 to 2014, he starred as Carmine Basco on the television soap opera The Young and the Restless.

In 2015, Dapper appeared as Adam in the horror film The Summoning.

In 2017, he starred in two films: as Bradley Talverson in Deadly Sanctuary and as Brad DeLuca in Hollywood Dirt.

In 2021, Dapper played the role of Dylan in the film Shapeless.

For the past couple of years, as of 2026, Marco has been creating paintings both out of enjoyment, as well as by commission. To buy, or commission a painting, one only needs to visit Marco's Instagram account to learn how.

== Filmography ==
=== Film ===
Year	Title	Role	Notes
2006	Eating Out 2: Sloppy Seconds	Troy	
2011	I Choose Chaos	Billy	
2012	Nowhere Else	Randy	
2013	Like a Bat Outta Hell	Randy	
2015	The Summoning	Adam	
2017	Deadly Sanctuary	Bradley Talverson	
2017	Hollywood Dirt	Brad DeLuca	
2019	Chiroptera	Randy	
2021	Shapeless	Dylan	

=== Television ===
Year	Title	Role	Notes
2007	Veronica Mars	Super Hot Guy	Episode: "Show Me the Monkey"
2007	Dirty Sexy Money	Ryan Casdale	2 episodes
2009	90210	Milo	Episode: "Life's a Drag"
2010	Trauma	Asher	Episode: "Scope of Practice"
2011	Private Practice	Hot Guy	Episode: "God Laughs"
2012	The Client List	Wade	Episode: "The Rub of Sugarland"
2012–2014	The Young and the Restless	Carmine Basco	Recurring role
2013	Mistresses	Hot Bellboy	Episode: "I Choose You"
2013	The Stafford Project	Marco	Episode: "The Nut Cracker"
2013	Criminal Minds	Greg	Episode: "Fate"
2014	Stalker	Richard	Episode: "Tell All"
2014	Dig	Bodyguard	Episode: "Meet the Rosenbergs"
2016	Hit the Floor	Hot Doctor	Episode: "Loss"
2017	Betch	Hot Dad	Episode: "A Lil' Laurd Sketch Show"
2017	Small Shots	Ryan	Episode: "Fast Break"
2017	Bridal Boot Camp	Jordan	TV movie
2020	Psycho Party Planner	Jason Anderson	TV movie
