= Max Ehrich =

American actor, singer, and dancer

- Born: June 24, 1991 (age 35); Marlboro, New Jersey, U.S.
- Occupations: Actor; singer; dancer
- Years active: 2004–present

Max Lewis Ehrich (born June 24, 1991) is an American actor, singer, and dancer.

== Life and career ==
Ehrich was raised in Marlboro Township, New Jersey, in a Jewish family with mother Rhonda Ehrich and father Bruce Ehrich. He made his film debut starring in One Easy Job (2004), then had a supporting role as principal dancer in High School Musical 3: Senior Year. Breaking into television, Ehrich played Randy in two episodes of Ugly Betty. He then played 16-year-old jock Jesse Moretti in the 2009 Lifetime TV-movie The Pregnancy Pact, starring Thora Birch, Camryn Manheim, and Nancy Travis. He filmed two pilots for CBS in 2010, and later filmed as a guest star for the CMT sitcom Working Class, starring Melissa Peterman. He played Adam in iStart A Fan War, a TV-movie for the Nickelodeon show iCarly.

In 2012, Ehrich joined the American CBS Daytime soap opera The Young and the Restless as Fenmore Baldwin. The following year he received a Daytime Emmy Award nomination for Outstanding Younger Actor in a Drama Series for his portrayal. Ehrich chose a scene where Fenmore tells Jamie that Summer is the one cyberbullying him. From 2014 through 2015, he appeared in a recurring role throughout CBS' Under the Dome, as Hunter May. He additionally has appeared on series including Law & Order: Special Victims Unit. He had a recurring role on the Nickelodeon show 100 Things to Do Before High School, and appeared as Quinn in six episodes of Embeds. In 2019, Ehrich appeared in the Netflix film Walk. Ride. Rodeo.

== Personal life ==
Ehrich and singer Demi Lovato began dating in March 2020 and became engaged that July. Two months later, the couple called off their engagement.

On October 7, 2025, Ehrich was arrested in Florida on charges of domestic battery against an elderly family member, later identified as his mother, Rhonda. He posted bond and was released the following day. According to the police report, Ehrich's mother claimed he had been "heavily" abusing inhalants, and the state's 5150 hold was cited. The hold, also known as the Leo Baker Act, applies to individuals who may require crisis services while suffering from mental illness.

== Discography ==
=== Singles ===
Year	Title
2016	Baby, It's Cold Outside (with Rebecca Black)
2019	Somebody Else
2020	Afraid
2023	BACKROADS
2024	Can't Forget Her Now
2024	Thank U
2025	LAX

=== Other Songs ===
Year	Title	Album
2019	Ride	from the Netflix Film: Walk. Ride. Rodeo.
2023	All I Want Is You (Big Sky Remix) [with Thad Beaty]	from the Lifetime Original Movie: A Cowboy Christmas Romance
2023	Preacher Man of Rock and Roll	from the Motion Picture Soundtrack: Southern Gospel
2023	You Still Love Me [with Katelyn Nacon]	from the Motion Picture Soundtrack: Southern Gospel
2023	I Hold A Clear Title	from the Motion Picture Soundtrack: Southern Gospel
2023	I Surrender All [with Katelyn Nacon]	from the Motion Picture Soundtrack: Southern Gospel
2023	You Still Love Me (Barry's Version) [with J. Alphonse Nicholson]	from the Motion Picture Soundtrack: Southern Gospel
2023	Nonchalant [with Katelyn Nacon, Jeffrey Smith]	from the Motion Picture Soundtrack: Southern Gospel

== Filmography ==
=== Film ===
Year	Title	Role	Notes
2004	One Easy Job	Henry	Short film
2008	High School Musical 3: Senior Year	Principal dancer	
2011	Grace Face	Dylan	Short film
2018	The Last Breakfast Club	Andrew	
2019	Walk. Ride. Rodeo.	Tate Watkins	Netflix Original
2023	Southern Gospel	Samuel Allen	

=== Television ===
Year	Title	Role	Notes
2008	Ugly Betty	Randy	2 episodes
2010	The Pregnancy Pact	Jesse Moretti	Television film
2010	Shake It Up	Eddie	2 episodes
2010	iCarly	Adam	Episode: "iStart a Fan War"
2010	No Ordinary Family	Dylan	Episode: "No Ordinary Anniversary"
2011	Parenthood	Bradley	Episode: "Damage Control"
2011	Working Class	Josh	Episode: "The Dance"
2012–2015	The Young and the Restless	Fenmore Baldwin	Role held: June 11, 2012 – May 18, 2015
2014–2015	Under the Dome	Hunter May	19 episodes
2014	Law & Order: Special Victims Unit	Daniel Pryor	Episode: "Pornstar's Requiem"
2014–2016	100 Things to Do Before High School	Ronbie Martin	10 episodes
2016	The Path	Freddie Ridge	3 episodes
2016–2017	Sweet/Vicious	Landon Mays	3 episodes
2019	American Princess	Brett	Recurring role
2025-	The Bay		

== Awards and nominations ==
List of acting awards and nominations
Year	Award	Category	Title	Result	Ref.
2011	Young Artist Award	Best Performance in a TV Movie, Miniseries or Special – Supporting Actor	The Pregnancy Pact	Nominated	
2012	Young Artist Award	Best Performance in a TV Series – Guest Starring Young Actor 18–21	Parenthood	Nominated	
2013	Daytime Emmy Award	Outstanding Younger Actor in a Drama Series	The Young and the Restless	Nominated	
2014	Daytime Emmy Award	Outstanding Younger Actor in a Drama Series	The Young and the Restless	Nominated	
2015	Daytime Emmy Award	Outstanding Younger Actor in a Drama Series	The Young and the Restless	Nominated	
2016	Daytime Emmy Award	Outstanding Younger Actor in a Drama Series	The Young and the Restless	Nominated	
