= Tracey E. Bregman =

American soap opera actress

- Born: May 29, 1963 (age 63); Munich, West Germany
- Other names: Tracey Bregman Recht; Tracey E. Bregman Recht
- Education: American Academy of Dramatic Arts; Lee Strasberg Theatre and Film Institute
- Occupation: Actress
- Years active: 1978–present
- Spouse: Ronald Recht (m. 1987; div. 2010)
- Children: 2
- Parents: Buddy Bregman; Suzanne Lloyd
- Family: Jule Styne (great-uncle)

Tracey Elizabeth Bregman (born May 29, 1963) is an American actress. She is best known for the role of Lauren Fenmore on the CBS soap operas The Young and the Restless and The Bold and the Beautiful.

== Early life ==
Bregman was born in Munich to American musical arranger, record producer and composer Buddy Bregman and Canadian-born actress Suzanne Lloyd. Her paternal great-uncle was songwriter Jule Styne. Bregman is of part Ukrainian-Jewish ancestry through her father.

Bregman lived in London, England until the age of 10 when her family relocated to California. She has been acting since she was 11 years old, and currently resides in Malibu, California. She studied acting at the American Academy of Dramatic Arts and the Lee Strasberg Theatre and Film Institute.

== Career ==
Bregman made her acting debut playing a small part in the 1978 made-for-television movie, Three on a Date. Later that year, she was cast in the NBC daytime soap opera, Days of Our Lives portraying troubled teen, Donna Temple Craig. In 1979, she received Young Artist Award for Best Juvenile Actress in A Daytime Series for her performance in soap. She left the soap in 1980. In 1981, she made her big screen debut starring in the slasher film Happy Birthday to Me by Columbia Pictures. She later starred alongside Jill St. John in the prison drama film The Concrete Jungle (1982) and in the Canadian comedy-drama film, The Funny Farm (1983). On television, she guest-starred on The Littlest Hobo, The Love Boat, Fame, and The Fall Guy.

In 1983, Bregman returned to daytime television with the role of Lauren Fenmore in the CBS's The Young and the Restless. Bregman initially believed her role as Lauren would be brief, but after six months the soap offered her a contract and she accepted. When it was introduced in 1985, she was the first actress to be awarded the Daytime Emmy Award for Outstanding Younger Actress in a Drama Series (then known as the "Outstanding Ingenue in a Drama Series"), being nominated for the same award again in 1987 and for Outstanding Supporting Actress in a Drama Series in both 2006 and 2008. In 1992, Bregman brought the character to The Bold and the Beautiful, resulting in her migrating there fully in 1995. In 2000, Bregman returned to The Young and the Restless, remaining on a recurring status. From April to June 2010, while still portraying Lauren, Bregman took on double-duty with The Young and the Restless, as she also portrayed Sheila Carter's sister, Sarah. In, 2010, she also appeared alongside her Y&R co-star, Christian LeBlanc, in the music video for Reba McEntire's single, "I Keep On Loving You".

Bregman appeared in a number of made-for-television movies, including Sex & Mrs. X (2000), Low Lifes (2012), and A Very Charming Christmas Town (2020). Bregman starred in the 2013 thriller film Misogynist alongside Jonathan Bennett and Eve Mauro, earning a nomination for Best Actress at the Los Angeles Underground Film Festival.

== Personal life ==
Bregman was a vegetarian from an early age and now follows a vegan lifestyle.

Bregman married Ron Recht in 1987; the couple had two sons, Austin (born 1991) and Landon (born 1996). They divorced after 23 years of marriage in 2010.

On April 7, 2014, Bregman was inducted into the Ride of Fame and has a New York City double decker bus dedicated to her and her accomplishments. She lost her Malibu home to a wildfire in November 2018. Bregman is an active supporter and honorary board member for Chenoa Manor, an animal sanctuary in Chester County, Pennsylvania.

== Filmography ==
Year	Title	Role	Notes
1978	Three on a Date	Contestant	Television film
1979	The Girl with ESP	Jill	Television film
1978–80	Days of Our Lives	Donna Temple Craig	Series regular
1980	The Littlest Hobo	Jib	Episode: "Sailing Away"
1981	Happy Birthday to Me	Ann Thomerson	
1982	The Love Boat	Trish Carruthers	Episodes: "The Musical/My Ex-Mom/The Show Must Go On/The Pest/My Aunt, the Worrier: Part 1 and Part 2"
1982	The Concrete Jungle	Elizabeth	
1982	Fame	Jenny McClain	Episode: "Words"
1983	The Fall Guy	Carrie Stanford	Episode: "The Further Adventures of Ozzie and Harold"
1983	The Family Tree	Katy Allen	Episode: "The Burglary"
1983	The Funny Farm	Amy Lowell	
1983	Gavilan	Susan	Episode: "The Midas Keys"
1983–95, 2000–present	The Young and the Restless	Lauren Fenmore; Sarah Smythe	Series regular/recurring
1992–1993, 1995–99, 2002, 2004, 2007, 2022, 2023, 2024	The Bold and the Beautiful	Lauren Fenmore	Series regular (1995–99); recurring (1992–93, 1995, 2002, 2004, 2007, 2022, 2023, 2024)
2000	Sex & Mrs. X	Katherine	Television film
2001	Spyder Games	Ms. Phillips	2 episodes
2012	Low Lifes	Sabrina	Television film
2013	Misogynist	Rebecca	
2017	Still	Doctor Hansen	Short film
2020	Hungry Dog	Dog	Voice
2020	A Very Charming Christmas Town	Miriam Larsen	Television film
2021	City Limits	Sophia	
2021	Swag Town	Hannah Fields	

== Awards and nominations ==
List of acting awards and nominations
Year	Award	Category	Title	Result	Ref.
1979	Soapy Award	Most Exciting New Actress:	Days of Our Lives	Won	
1979	Young Artist Award	Best Juvenile Actress in A Daytime Series	Days of Our Lives	Won	
1980	Young Artist Award	Best Young Actress - Daytime TV Series	Days of Our Lives	Nominated	
1983	Young Artist Award	Best Young Actress in a Daytime Soap	The Young and the Restless	Won	
1985	Daytime Emmy Award	Outstanding Ingenue in a Drama Series	The Young and the Restless	Won	
1986	Soap Opera Digest Award	Outstanding Young Leading Actress on a Daytime Serial	The Young and the Restless	Nominated	
1987	Daytime Emmy Award	Outstanding Ingenue in a Drama Series	The Young and the Restless	Nominated	
1993	Soap Opera Digest Award	Hottest Female Star	The Young and the Restless	Nominated	
1998	Soap Opera Digest Award	Outstanding Female Scene Stealer	The Bold and the Beautiful	Nominated	
2006	Daytime Emmy Award	Outstanding Supporting Actress in a Drama Series	The Young and the Restless	Nominated	
2008	Daytime Emmy Award	Outstanding Supporting Actress in a Drama Series	The Young and the Restless	Nominated	
2013	Los Angeles International; Underground Film Festival	Best Actress	Misogynist	Nominated	
2016	Daytime Emmy Award	Outstanding Lead Actress in a Drama Series	The Young and the Restless	Nominated	
