= Christian LeBlanc =

American actor (born 1958)

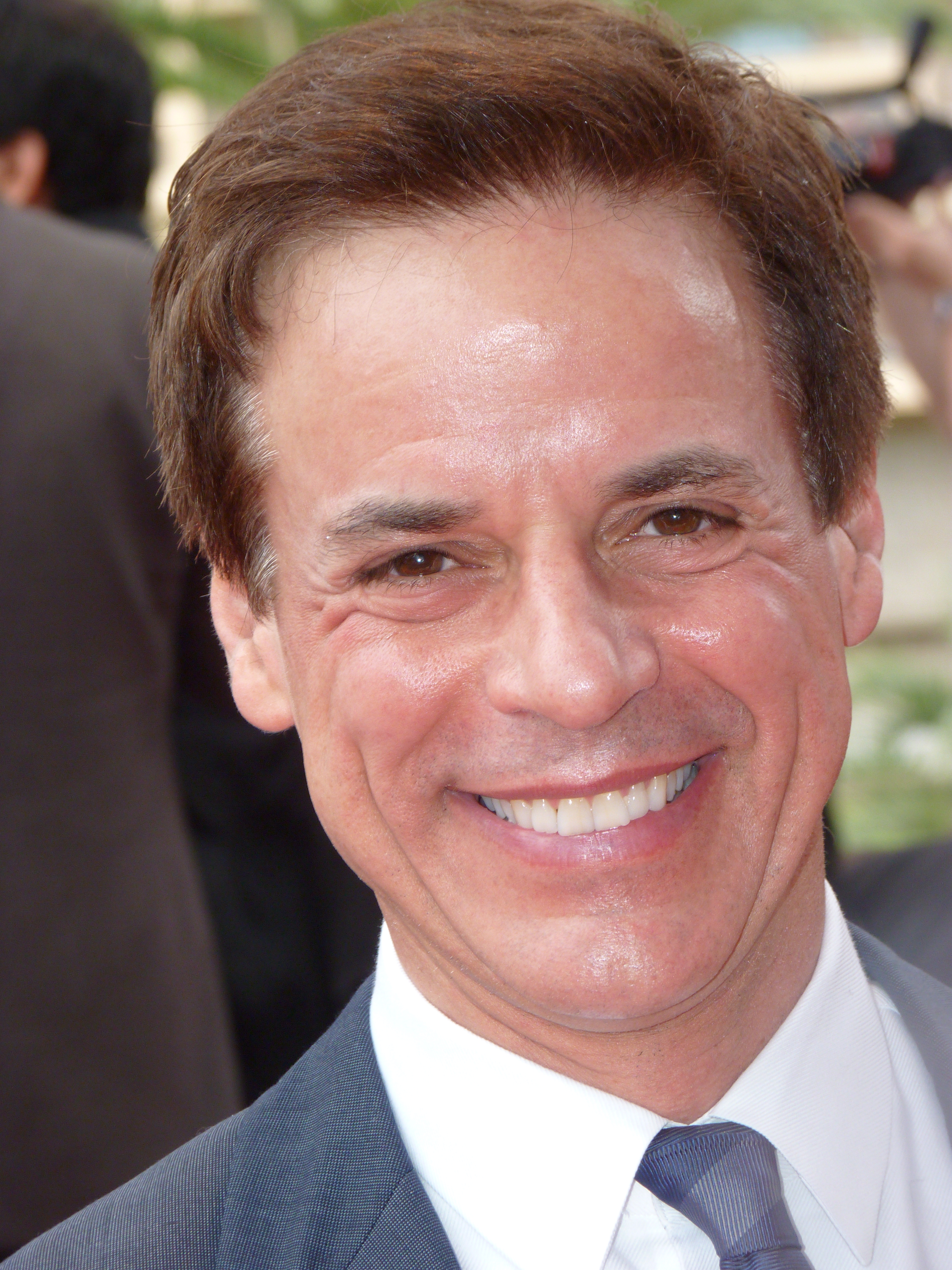
- Christian LeBlanc at the 2012 Monte-Carlo Television Festival
- Born: Christian Jules LeBlanc; August 25, 1958 (age 68); Fort Bragg, North Carolina, U.S.
- Education: Tulane University
- Occupation: Actor
- Years active: 1983–present
- Spouse: Sid Montz (m. 1993)
- Website: christianjulesleblanc.com

Christian Jules LeBlanc (born August 25, 1958) is an American television actor. He is best known for playing the role of Michael Baldwin on The Young and the Restless (1991 to 1993, 1997 to present). He has received thirteen Daytime Emmy Award nominations, including three wins (2005, 2007, and 2009) for his work on The Young and the Restless.

== Early life ==
LeBlanc was born in Fort Bragg, North Carolina. His father is retired Major Andre Victor LeBlanc, a decorated veteran and winner of the Bronze Star. He is the second of eight children. He was raised in New Orleans, Louisiana, in a renovated plantation house on the banks of the Mississippi River. While researching his family's genealogy, LeBlanc found that his grandmother was legally a slave and his mother was Creole.

He began acting in high school, when a girl talked him into auditioning for a school production of West Side Story. He was cast as a Shark. He then played a beggar in Fiddler on the Roof, where his classmate, future New Orleans Mayor Mitch Landrieu, also had a role.

He graduated with honors from Tulane University, majoring in ancient history and pre-med.

== Career ==
While in college, LeBlanc was noticed by a photographer while swimming at a pool, which led to modeling and acting opportunities. He worked at a variety of jobs to support himself early in his career, including as a busboy at Helmsley Palace, where his boss was Leona Helmsley. He also had jobs as a teacher and a caterer.

He was offered a role in a PBS series, Edit Point. He was then cast as Kirk McColl on the CBS soap opera As the World Turns, playing the role from 1983 to 1985. After leaving As the World Turns, he had a regular role on In the Heat of the Night. He guest-starred on E.A.R.T.H. Force, Cheers, Riptide, Hotel, and Gabriel's Fire.

LeBlanc was cast on The Young and the Restless as Michael Baldwin in 1991 and played the role until 1993. After a short absence, he returned in 1997 and has been with the show ever since. He also played Michael in crossover episodes on As the World Turns in 2005. He has been nominated for a Daytime Emmy Award for the role nine times, and won for Outstanding Lead Actor in a Drama Series in 2005, 2007, and 2009.

In 1993, he appeared in a Perry Mason TV Movie. He was also cast in the Showtime late-night cable TV series Red Shoe Diaries, and reprised the role for a video movie.

LeBlanc starred on stage in Ladies in Retirement at the Coconut Grove Playhouse in 1995, co-starring with Julie Harris. The play was directed by Charles Nelson Reilly, who was also his acting coach. His other theater credits include productions of No Orchids for Miss Blandish, The Catonsville Nine, and Appearances to the Contrary.

In 2000, LeBlanc produced and acted in a short film, Puppy Love, co-starring with Grace Zabriskie. The film won Outstanding Short Film at the Los Angeles and New York International Short Film Festivals.

LeBlanc appeared alongside his The Young and the Restless wife, Tracey E. Bregman, in the video for I Keep On Loving You by Reba McEntire in 2010. From 2011 to 2014, he played Jake on the web series Venice: The Series.

LeBlanc acted in and produced the 2013 film Grave Secrets, co-starring with Diane Ladd and Ashley Jones. A television episode version of the film aired as part of Nickelodeon's Deadtime Stories on Halloween. LeBlanc's role was edited out of the television version.

In 2022, he starred Off-Broadway in Cat on a Hot Tin Roof at Theatre at St. Clements, co-starring with Sonoya Mizuno and Matt de Rogatis. In March 2024, LeBlanc and de Rogatis reprised their roles, bringing the production to the 2024 Tennessee Williams & New Orleans Literary Festival.

== Personal life ==
LeBlanc's art work has been displayed in Los Angeles, New Orleans, and Washington, D.C.

On June 20, 2021, he revealed on Maurice Benard's Youtube series State of Mind that he is gay and has been married to his husband since 1993.

In October 2023, LeBlanc announced that he had been diagnosed with Multiple myeloma in June of that year and that the cancer was in remission. He had first noticed symptoms on the set of The Young and the Restless and took time off while receiving treatment.

== Filmography ==
=== Film ===
Year	Title	Role	Notes
1998	The Disturbance at Dinner	Pat in the Box	
2000	Puppy Love	John Luster	Short film Also producer
2013	Grave Secrets	Mr. Peterson	Also producer
2020	Across the Room	Waiter	Short film

=== Television ===
Year	Title	Role	Notes
1983–1985	As the World Turns	Kirk McColl	Contract role
2005	As the World Turns	Michael Baldwin	Guest role
1986	Riptide	Johnny Farnell	Episode: "The Wedding Bell Blues"
1986	Hotel	Male Desk Clerk	Episode: "Opening Moves"
1987	Cheers	Assistant No. 2	Episode: "A Kiss is Still a Kiss"
1988	In the Heat of the Night	Patrolman Junior Abernathy	8 episodes, credited as "Christian Le Blanc"
1990	E.A.R.T.H. Force		
1991	Monsters	John O'Connell	Episode: "The Waiting Room"
1991	Gabriel's Fire	Kyle Ray	Episode: "Truth and Consequences"
1991	Seeds of Tragedy	Driver	Television film
1993	Perry Mason: The Case of the Killer Kiss	Sheriff	Television film
1995	Diagnosis: Murder	Coach Caldwell	Episode: "An Innocent Murder"
1991–1993	The Young and the Restless	Michael Baldwin	Contract role
1997–present	The Young and the Restless	Michael Baldwin	Contract role
2009	Guiding Light	Wedding guest	2 episodes

=== Web series ===
Year	Title	Role	Notes
2011-2014	Venice: The Series	Jake	24 episodes

== Awards and nominations ==
Year	Award	Category	Title	Result	Ref.
1999	Daytime Emmy Award	Outstanding Supporting Actor in a Drama Series	The Young and the Restless	Nominated	
1999	Soap Opera Digest Award	Favorite Return	The Young and the Restless	Nominated	
2000	Daytime Emmy Award	Outstanding Supporting Actor in a Drama Series	The Young and the Restless	Nominated	
2003	Daytime Emmy Award	Outstanding Supporting Actor in a Drama Series	The Young and the Restless	Nominated	
2004	Daytime Emmy Award	Outstanding Supporting Actor in a Drama Series	The Young and the Restless	Nominated	
2005	Daytime Emmy Award	Outstanding Lead Actor in a Drama Series	The Young and the Restless	Won	
2005	Soap Opera Digest Award	Outstanding Supporting Actor	The Young and the Restless	Nominated	
2007	Daytime Emmy Award	Outstanding Lead Actor in a Drama Series	The Young and the Restless	Won	
2008	Daytime Emmy Award	Outstanding Lead Actor in a Drama Series	The Young and the Restless	Nominated	
2009	Daytime Emmy Award	Outstanding Lead Actor in a Drama Series	The Young and the Restless	Won	
2011	Daytime Emmy Award	Outstanding Lead Actor in a Drama Series	The Young and the Restless	Nominated	
2014	Daytime Emmy Award	Outstanding Lead Actor in a Drama Series	The Young and the Restless	Nominated	
2014	Indie Series Award	Best Guest Star – Comedy	Fumbling thru the Pieces	Nominated	
2015	Daytime Emmy Award	Outstanding Lead Actor in a Drama Series	The Young and the Restless	Nominated	
2016	Daytime Emmy Award	Outstanding Lead Actor in a Drama Series	The Young and the Restless	Nominated	
2026	Daytime Emmy Award	Outstanding Lead Actor in a Drama Series	The Young and the Restless	Nominated	
