= 38th Daytime Emmy Awards =

- Date: June 19, 2011 (Ceremony); June 17 (Creative Arts Awards)
- Location: Las Vegas Hilton, Paradise, Nevada
- Presented by: National Academy of Television Arts and Sciences
- Hosted by: Wayne Brady

Highlights
- Outstanding Drama Series: The Bold and the Beautiful
- Outstanding Game Show: Jeopardy! and Wheel of Fortune (tie)

Television/radio coverage
- Network: CBS
- Produced by: Associated Television International

The 38th Annual Daytime Emmy Awards were held on Sunday, June 19, 2011, at the Las Vegas Hilton, and were televised on CBS. The Daytime Entertainment Creative Arts Emmy Awards were presented two days earlier on June 17 at the Westin Bonaventure Hotel.

The televised ceremony was hosted by Wayne Brady. The Pre-Nominations were announced on February 25, and the final nominations were announced May 11, 2011. At the event, Pat Sajak and Alex Trebek both received a Lifetime Achievement Award.

== Nominations and winners ==
The following is a partial list of nominees and winners. Winners are listed first and highlighted in boldface.

=== Programs ===
Outstanding Drama Series	Outstanding Game/Audience Participation Show
**The Bold and the Beautiful (CBS)**; All My Children (ABC); General Hospital (ABC); The Young and the Restless (CBS)	A first place tie was recorded in this category: **Jeopardy! (Syndicated)**; **Wheel of Fortune (Syndicated)**; Cash Cab (Discovery Channel); The Price Is Right (CBS)
Outstanding Talk Show-Entertainment	Outstanding Talk Show-Informative
**The Ellen DeGeneres Show (Syndicated)**; Live with Regis and Kelly (Syndicated); Rachael Ray (Syndicated); The View (ABC)	**The Dr. Oz Show (Syndicated)**; Dr. Phil (Syndicated); The Doctors (Syndicated)
Outstanding Morning Program	Outstanding Lifestyle Program
**The Today Show (NBC)**; Good Morning America (ABC)	**Martha (Hallmark Channel)**; How Do I Look? (Style Network); My Generation PBS); The Nate Berkus Show (Syndicated)
Outstanding Legal/Courtroom Program	Outstanding Culinary Program
**Judge Pirro (Syndicated)**; Divorce Court; Judge Judy; The People's Court; Swift Justice with Nancy Grace	**Avec Eric (PBS)**; America's Test Kitchen (PBS); Cook's Country (PBS); Lidia's Italy (PBS); Paula's Best Dishes (Food Network); Secrets of a Restaurant Chef (Food Network)

=== Acting ===
Outstanding Lead Performance in a Drama Series
Actor	Actress
**Michael Park as Jack Snyder on As the World Turns**; Maurice Benard as Sonny Corinthos on General Hospital; Ricky Paull Goldin as Jake Martin on All My Children; Christian LeBlanc as Michael Baldwin on The Young and the Restless; James Scott as EJ DiMera on Days of Our Lives	**Laura Wright as Carly Jacks on General Hospital**; Susan Flannery as Stephanie Forrester on The Bold and the Beautiful; Alicia Minshew as Kendall Hart on All My Children; Debbi Morgan as Angie Hubbard on All My Children; Michelle Stafford as Phyllis Summers on The Young and the Restless; Colleen Zenk as Barbara Ryan on As the World Turns
Outstanding Supporting Performance in a Drama Series
Actor	Actress
**Jonathan Jackson as Lucky Spencer on General Hospital**; Doug Davidson as Paul Williams on The Young and the Restless; Brian Kerwin as Charlie Banks on One Life to Live; Billy Miller as Billy Abbott on The Young and the Restless; Jason Thompson as Patrick Drake on General Hospital	**Heather Tom as Katie Logan Spencer on The Bold and the Beautiful**; Tricia Cast as Nina Webster on The Young and the Restless; Melissa Claire Egan as Annie Lavery on All My Children; Nancy Lee Grahn as Alexis Davis on General Hospital; Julie Pinson as Janet Ciccone on As the World Turns; Bree Williamson as Jessica Buchanan on One Life to Live
Outstanding Performance by a Younger Artist in a Drama Series
Actor	Actress
**Scott Clifton as Liam Spencer on The Bold and the Beautiful**; Chad Duell as Michael Corinthos on General Hospital; Chandler Massey as Will Horton on Days of Our Lives	**Brittany Allen as Marissa Tasker on All My Children**; Lexi Ainsworth as Kristina Davis on General Hospital; Emily O'Brien as Jana Hawkes on The Young and the Restless

=== Hosting ===
Outstanding Game Show Host	Outstanding Talk Show Host
**Ben Bailey, Cash Cab**; Wayne Brady, Let's Make a Deal; Todd Newton, Family Game Night; Meredith Vieira, Who Wants to Be a Millionaire	A first place tie was recorded in this category: **Regis Philbin and Kelly Ripa on Live with Regis and Kelly**; **Mehmet Oz on The Dr. Oz Show**; Rachael Ray on Rachael Ray; Travis Stork, Andrew Ordon, Jim Sears, and Lisa Masterson on The Doctors; Barbara Walters, Whoopi Goldberg, Joy Behar, Elisabeth Hasselbeck, and Sherri Shepherd on The View
Outstanding Lifestyle/Culinary Host	
**Martha Stewart, The Martha Stewart Show**; Christopher Kimball, America's Test Kitchen; Nate Berkus, The Nate Berkus Show; Paula Deen, Paula's Best Dishes; Anne Burrell, Secrets of a Restaurant Chef

=== Production ===
Outstanding Drama Series Writing Team	Outstanding Drama Series Directing Team
**The Young and the Restless** **(head writer - Maria Arena Bell, co-head writers - Hogan Sheffer, Scott Hamner, Writers - Anne Schoettle, Amanda L. Beall, Sandra Weintraub, Teresa Zimmerman, Natalie Minardi Slater, Linda Schreiber, Beth Milstein, Marla Kanelos, Jay Gibson, Janice Ferri Esser, Tom Casiello, Paula Cwikly)**; As the World Turns (Jean Passanante, head writer); The Bold and the Beautiful (Bradley Bell, head writer); Days of Our Lives (Dena Higley, head writer)	A first place tie was recorded in this category: **The Bold and the Beautiful** (Directors - Cynthia J. Popp, Michael Stich, Deveney Kelly, Jennifer Howard, Associate Directors - Steven A. Wacker, Clyde Kaplan, Catherine Sedwick, Stage Managers - Douglas Hayden, Laura Yale, Production Associate - Lori Staffier); **The Young and the Restless** (Directors - Andrew Lee, Dean LaMont, Sally McDonald, Mike Denney, Associate Directors - Marc Beruti, Jennifer Scott Christenson, Chris Mullen, Robbin Phillips, Stage Managers - Tom McDermott, Herbert Weaver, Jr., Production Associates - Nancy Ortenberg, Erica Meyer, Vanessa Noland); General Hospital; One Life to Live

=== Special awards ===
New Approaches - Daytime Entertainment
- What If... An All My Children, One Life to Live and General Hospital (ABC web series)
  - Executive Producers: Brian Briskman, Sue Johnson, Adam Rockmore
  - Producers: Leeanne Irvin, John Corser
  - Director: Frank Valentini
  - Writer: Sara Saedi
  - Associate Producer: Delara Adams-Warom
Outstanding Achievement for a Casting Director For A Drama Series
- General Hospital (ABC)
  - Casting Director: Mark Teschner
Outstanding Original Song for a Drama Series
- General Hospital (ABC) - "Bad For You"
  - Composer & Lyricist: Rick Krizman
Outstanding Special Class Short Format Daytime
- Venice: The Series (web series)
  - Executive Producers: Crystal Chappell, Kim Turrisi
  - Supervising Producer: Maria Macina

=== Outstanding Sound Editing - Live Action and Animation ===
- Thomas McGurk, Dave Howe, Sam Gray and Michael McAuliffe (Biz Kid$)
- Joe Franco, Jeff Malinowski and Matt Longoria (The Electric Company)
- Gordon Sproule, Jeff Davis and Johnny Ludgate (Hot Wheels: Battle Force 5)
- **Paulette Victor-Lifton, Matthew Thomas Hall, Jimmy Lifton, Ian Nyeste, Michael Petak, D.J. Lynch, Aran Tanchum, Dominick Certo and Lawrence Reyes (The Penguins of Madagascar)**
- Joe Pleiman and Patrick Downie (WordGirl)

=== Outstanding Music Direction and Composition ===
- **Adam Berry (The Penguins of Madagascar)**
- J. Walter Hawkes, Larry Hochman and Jeffrey Lesser (Wonder Pets)
- Sarah Durkee, Paul Jacobs and Christopher Cerf (Between the Lions)
- Mike Himelstein and Michael Turner (Mickey Mouse Clubhouse)
- Brian Tyler (Transformers: Prime)
- Jean-Christophe Prudhomme and Laurent Bertaud (The Garfield Show)

=== Outstanding Animated Program ===
- **Bob Schooley, Mark McCorkle, Bret Haaland, Chris Neuhahn, Dean Hoff and Dina Buteyn (The Penguins of Madagascar)**
- David Wilcox, Brian Grazer, Dorothea Gillim, Ellen Cockrill, Share Stallings, Matthew Baughman, Carol Greenwald, Ron Howard, Paul Higgins, David Kirschner, Jon Shapiro and Jacqui Deegan (Curious George)
- Kok Cheong Wong, Sue Bea Montgomery, Lisa Henson, Brian Henson, Jyotimoy Saha, Craig Bartlett and Halle Stanford-Grossman (Dinosaur Train)
- Janice Burgess, Jonny Belt, Sara Kamen, Ellen Martin, Robert Scull, Scott Dyer, Pamela Lehn, Jennifer Hill and Lynne Warner (The Backyardigans)
- Halle Stanford-Grossman, Joyce Campbell, Bradley Zweig, Lisa Henson and Chris Plourde (Sid the Science Kid)

=== Outstanding Performer In An Animated Program ===
- **Danny Jacobs (King Julien, The Penguins of Madagascar)**
- Steven Tyler (The Mad Hatter, Wonder Pets!: Adventures in Wonderland)
- Tom McGrath (Skipper, The Penguins of Madagascar)
- Martin Short (The Cat in the Hat, The Cat in the Hat Knows a Lot About That!)
- Bill Farmer (Goofy, Mickey Mouse Clubhouse)
- Peter Cullen (Optimus Prime, Transformers: Prime)

=== Outstanding Casting for an Animated Series or Special ===
- **Meredith Layne (The Penguins of Madagascar)**
- Aaron Drown (Kick Buttowski: Suburban Daredevil)
- Meredith Layne (Fanboy & Chum Chum)

=== Outstanding Writing in Animation ===
- **Bob Roth, Bill Motz and Brandon Sawyer (The Penguins of Madagascar)**
- John N. Huss, Ryan Raddatz, Tom Martin, Carla Filisha, Jack Ferraiolo and Eric Ledgin (WordGirl)
- P. Kevin Strader, Gentry Menzel, David Steven Cohen, Peter K. Hirsch and Jonathan Greenberg (Arthur)
- Marsha F. Griffin, Joseph Kuhr, Nicole Dubuc, Steven Melching and Duane Capizzi (Transformers: Prime)
- Tom Sheppard, Gene Grillo and Dan Serafin (Back at the Barnyard)
- Elise Allen, Joseph Purdy and Craig Bartlett (Dinosaur Train)

=== Outstanding Directing in an Animated Program ===
- Chris Savino and Sherm Cohen (Kick Buttowski: Suburban Daredevil)
- **Brian Sheesley, Jim Schumann, Russell Calabrese and Ginny McSwain (Fanboy & Chum Chum)**
- Dallas Parker, Colleen Holub and Terry Klassen (Martha Speaks)
- Nick Filippi, Christo Stamboliev, Dave Knott, Steve Loter and Lisa Schaffer (The Penguins of Madagascar)
- Christian Larocque, Graham MacDonald, Emmanuelle Gignac and Dee Shipley (Toot & Puddle)
- David Hartman, Shaunt Nigoghossian, Todd Waterman, Vinton Heuck and Susan Blu (Transformers: Prime)

=== Outstanding Special Class Animated Program ===
- Steve Oedekerk, Jed Spingarn, Paul Marshal and Kyle Jolly (Back at the Barnyard)
- **Eric Robles, Steve Tompkins, Fred Seibert, Shaun Cashman, Jason Meier, Therese Trujillo, Dean Hoff and MacGregor Middleton (Fanboy & Chum Chum)**

=== Lifetime Achievement Awards ===
- Pat Sajak
- Alex Trebek

=== Special tributes ===
- The Oprah Winfrey Show
- Susan Lucci
