= 39th Daytime Emmy Awards =

- Promotional poster
- Awarded for: Outstanding achievement in all fields of daytime television
- Date: June 23, 2012
- Location: Beverly Hilton Hotel
- Country: United States
- Presented by: National Academy of Television Arts and Sciences
- Preshow hosts: A.J. Hammer; Nischelle Turner

Highlights
- Most wins: General Hospital (5)
- Most nominations: General Hospital (23)
- Outstanding Drama Series: General Hospital
- Outstanding Game Show: Jeopardy!
- Website: emmyonline.org

Television/radio coverage
- Network: HLN
- Produced by: Gabriel Gornell; Executive Producer

The 39th Annual Daytime Emmy Awards presented by the National Academy of Television Arts and Sciences (NATAS), "recognizes outstanding achievement in all fields of daytime television production and are presented to individuals and programs broadcast from 2:00 a.m.—6:00 p.m. during the 2011 calendar year". The ceremony took place on June 23, 2012 at the Beverly Hilton Hotel, in Beverly Hills, California beginning at 5:00 p.m. PST / 8:00 p.m. EST. The ceremony was televised in the United States by HLN and produced by LocoDistro and Executive Producer Gabriel Gornell.

The evening was not hosted however the pre-show ceremony was hosted by A.J. Hammer and Nischelle Turner. The drama pre-nominees were announced on March 2, 2012, and the nominations were announced during an episode of The Today Show on May 9, 2012. In related events, the 39th Annual Creative Arts Emmy Awards ceremony was held at the Westin Bonaventure in Los Angeles on June 17, 2012.

General Hospital won the most awards, with a total of five wins including Outstanding Drama Series and Outstanding Drama Series Directing Team and other Creative Arts Emmy Awards. The soap opera also had the most awards with a total of 23 (including Creative Arts Emmy Awards). Anthony Geary won its seventh win in the Outstanding Lead Actor in a Drama Series category. Live! with Regis and Kelly won in the Outstanding Talk Show Entertainment category for its last season. The Lifetime Achievement Award was presented to television producer Bill Geddie. The ceremony attracted 912,000 viewers (not counting four repeat broadcasts which brought the total to 2 million), the broadcast was "the most watched regularly scheduled, non-news telecast" ever on HLN, but by far the least-watched Daytime Emmy ceremony ever.

== Winners and nominees ==
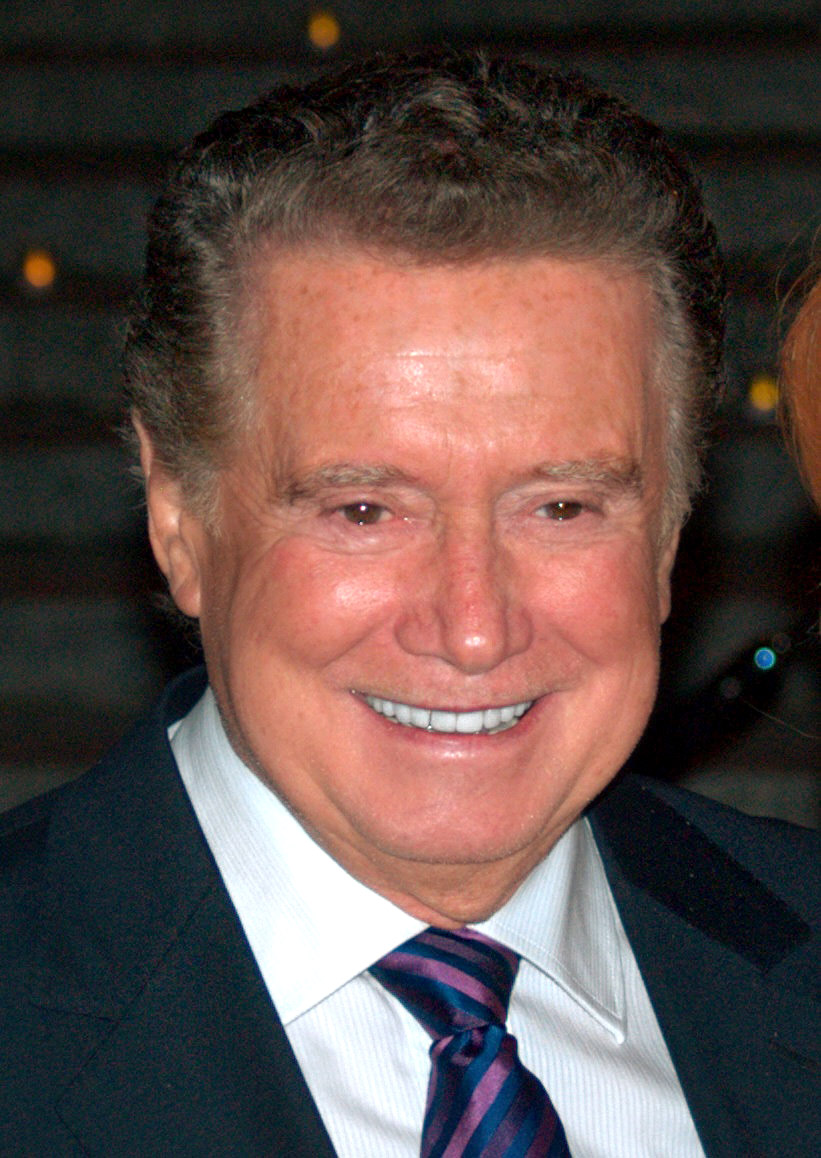
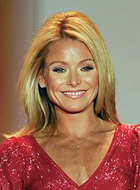
Regis Philbin (top) and Kelly Ripa (bottom), Outstanding Talk Show Host winners.

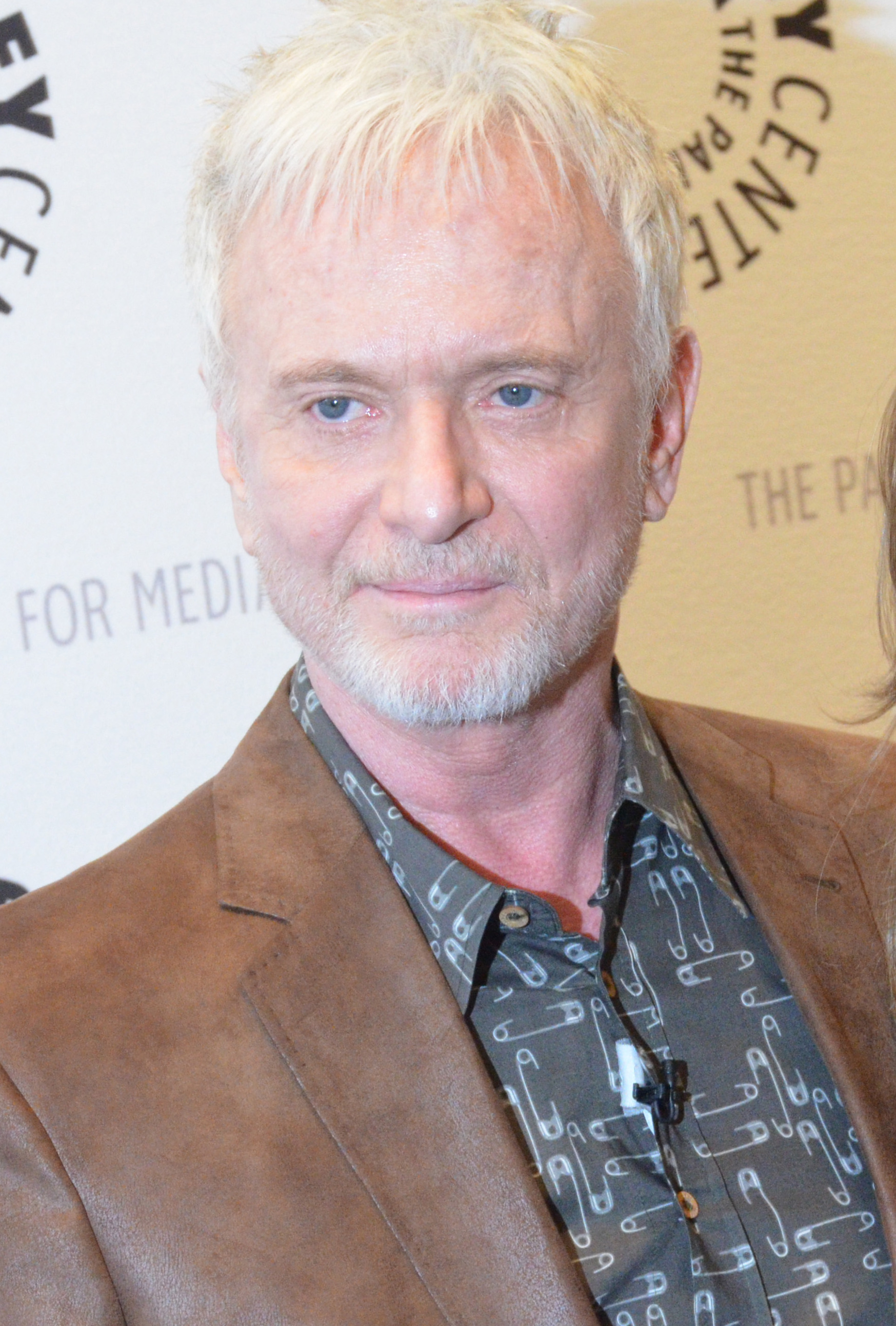
Anthony Geary, Outstanding Lead Actor in a Drama Series winner.

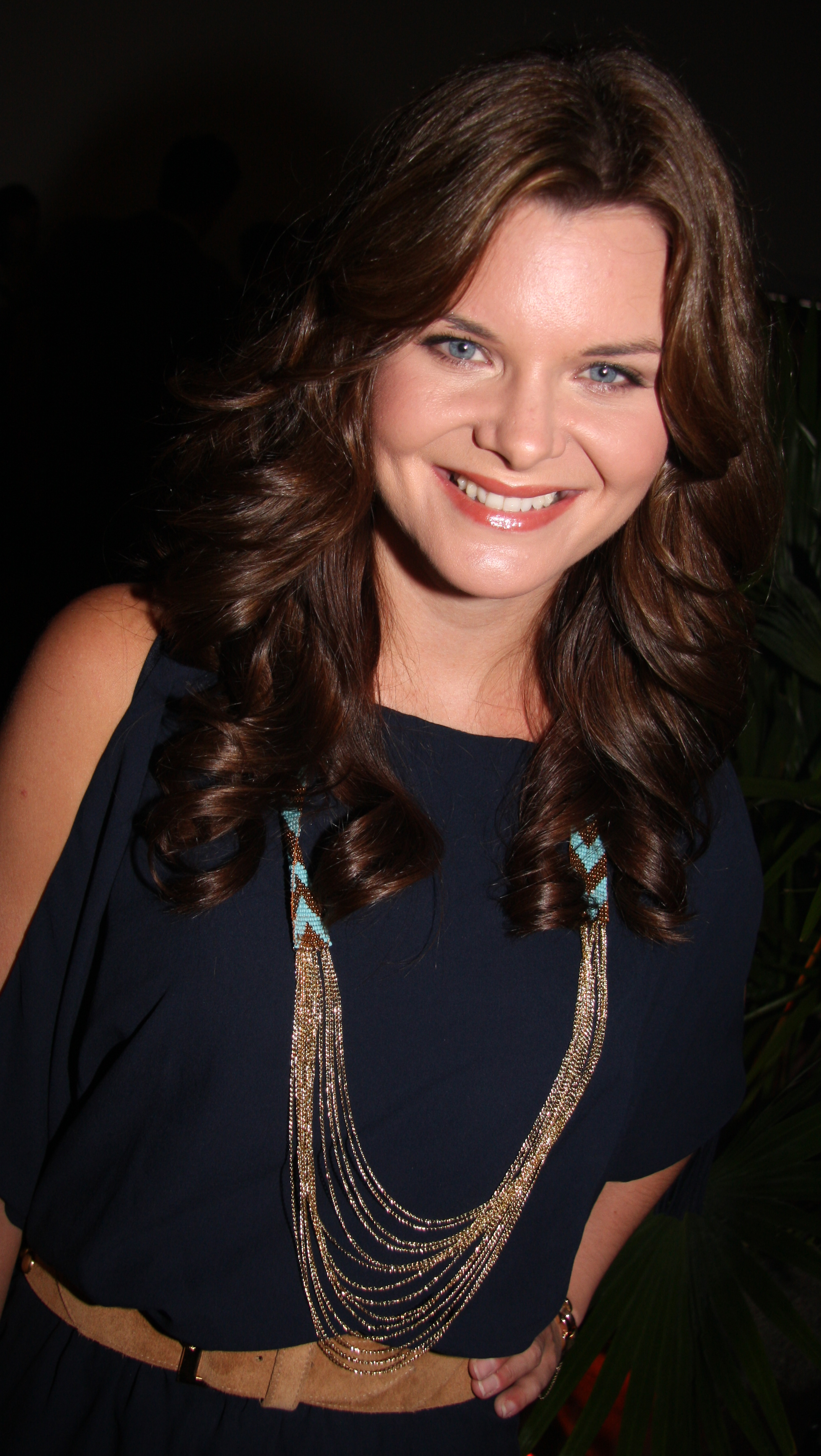
Heather Tom, Outstanding Lead Actress in a Drama Series winner.

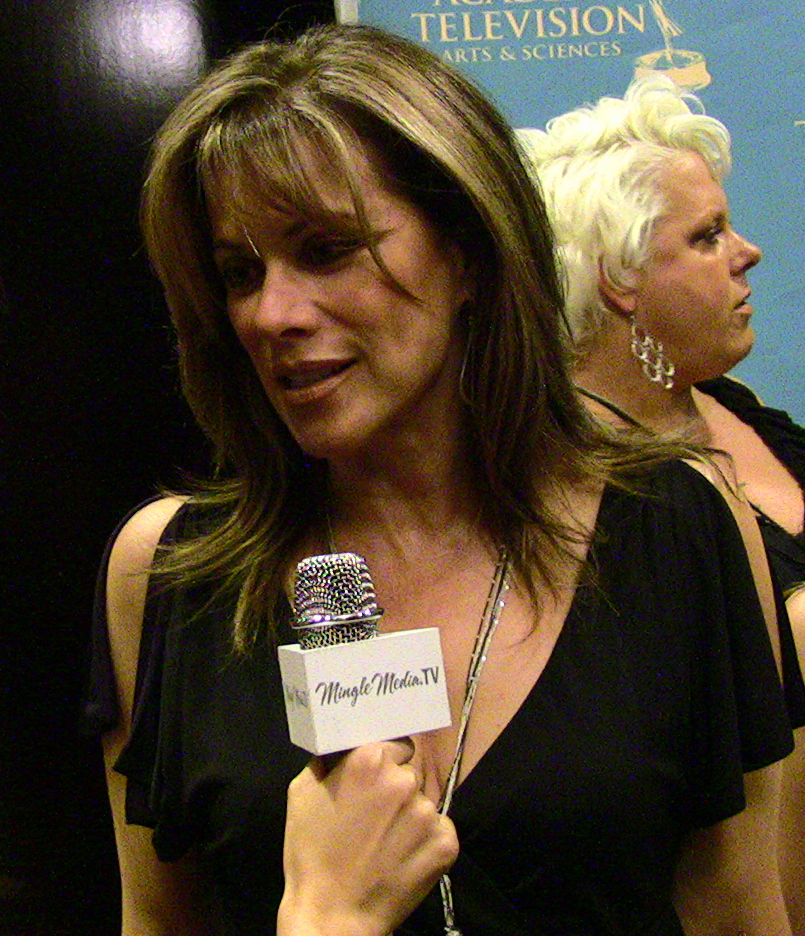
Nancy Lee Grahn, Outstanding Supporting Actress in a Drama Series winner.

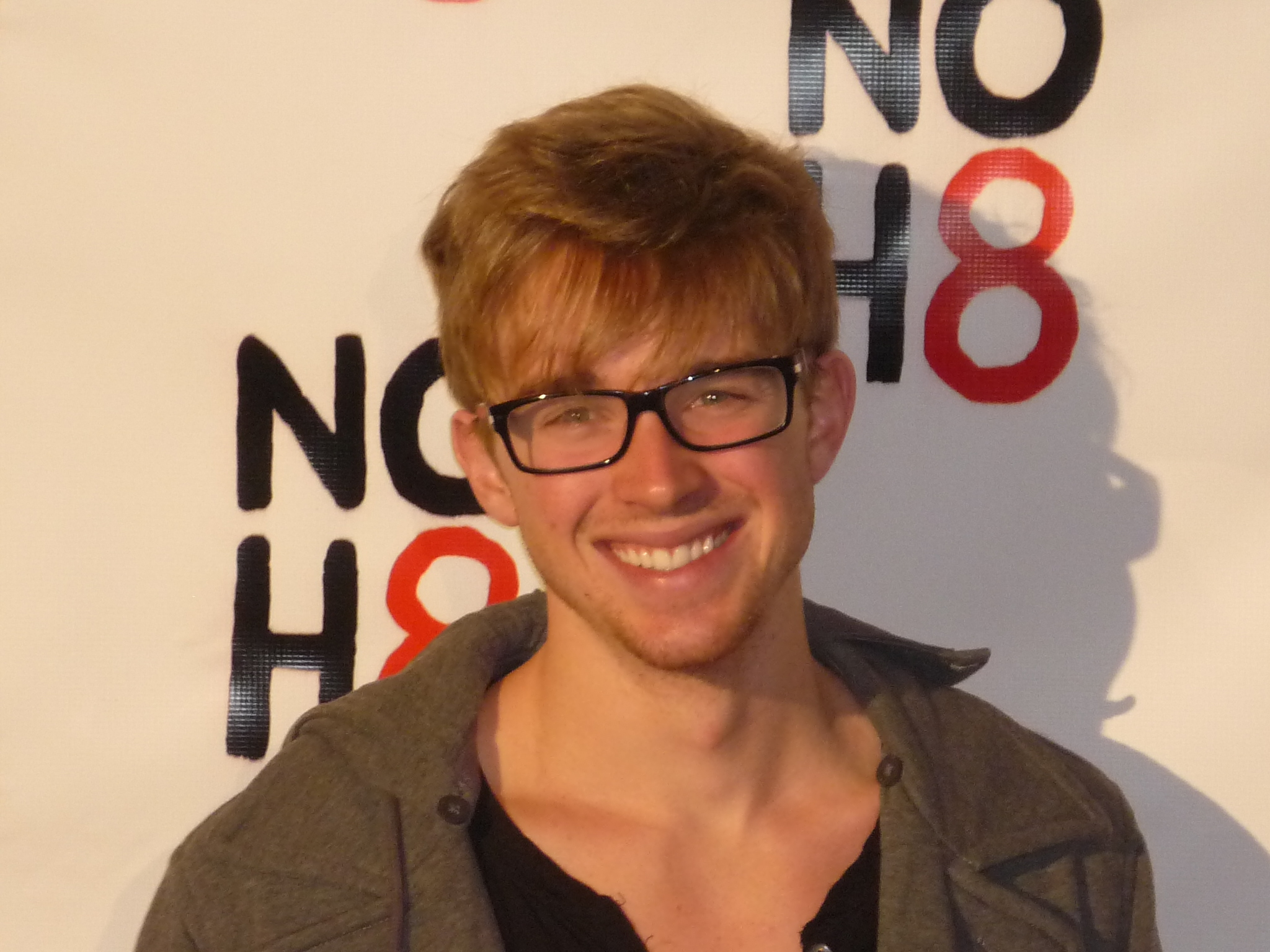
Chandler Massey, Outstanding Younger Actor in a Drama Series winner.

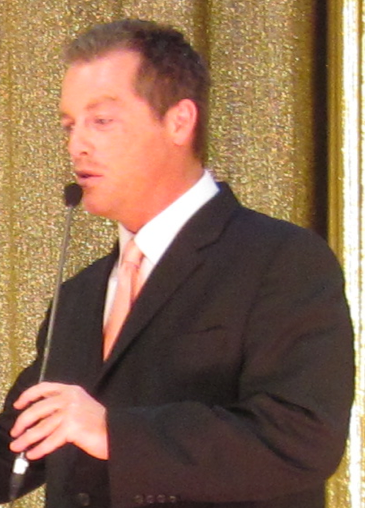
Todd Newton, Outstanding Game Show Host winner.

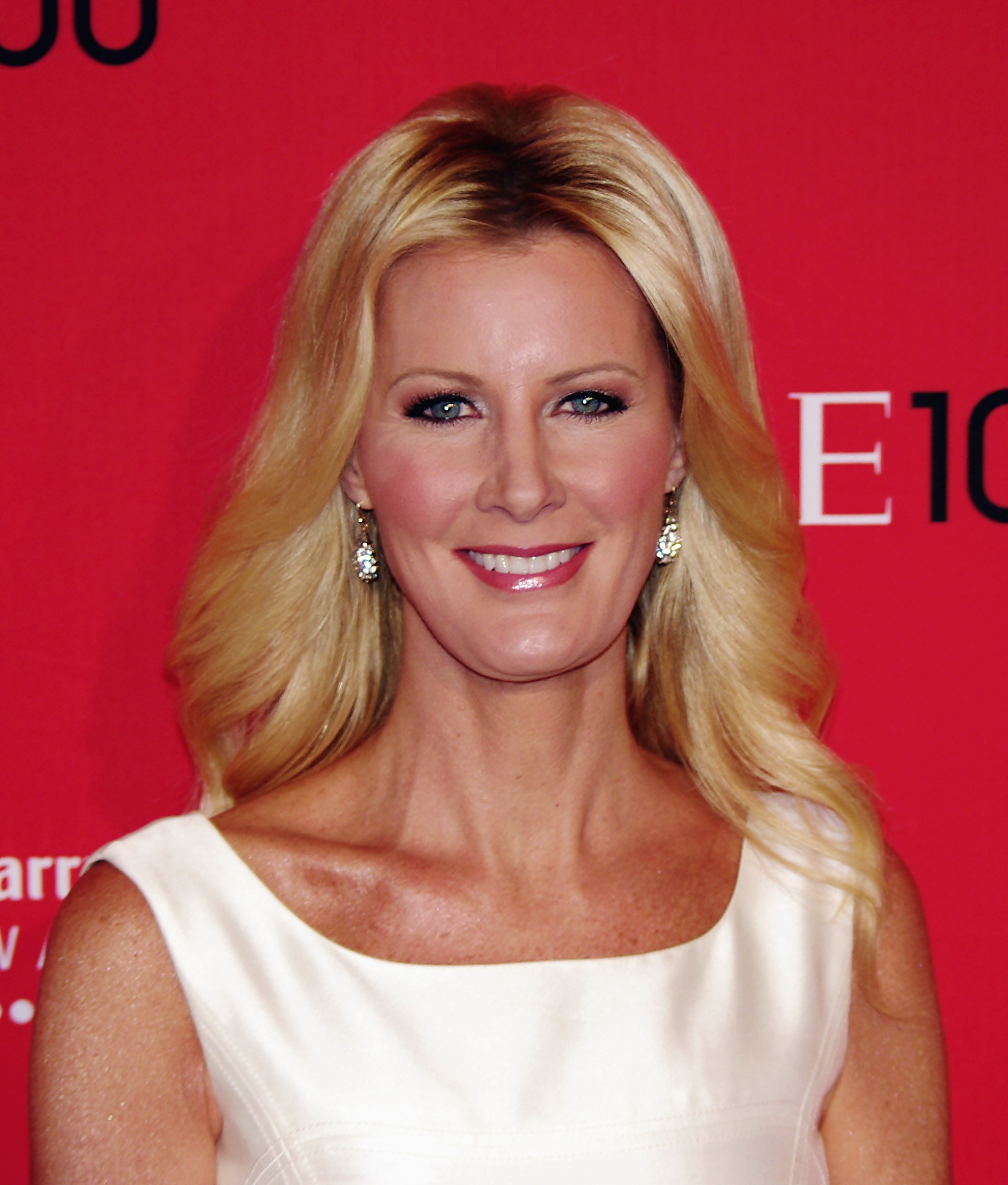
Sandra Lee, Outstanding Lifestyle/Culinary Host winner.

In the lists below, the winner of the category is shown first, followed by the other nominees.

Key	Meaning
‡	Indicates the winner

Category	Winners and nominees
Outstanding Drama Series	General Hospital‡; All My Children; Days of Our Lives; The Young and the Restless
Outstanding Children's Animated Program	The Penguins of Madagascar‡; Dora the Explorer; SpongeBob SquarePants; Curious George; Sid the Science Kid; Peep and the Big Wide World
Outstanding Game/Audience Participation Show	Jeopardy!‡; BrainSurge; Cash Cab; Let's Make a Deal; Wheel of Fortune; Who Wants to Be a Millionaire
Outstanding Legal/Courtroom Program	Last Shot with Judge Gunn‡; America's Court with Judge Ross; Judge Joe Brown; We the People With Gloria Allred
Outstanding Morning Program	The Today Show‡; Good Morning America
Outstanding New Approaches – Daytime Entertainment	Take This Lollipop‡; The Ellen DeGeneres Show; The Clarence Update - The Bold and the Beautiful; The Today Show
Outstanding Talk Show Entertainment	Live! with Regis and Kelly‡; The Ellen DeGeneres Show; The Talk; The View
Outstanding Talk Show Informative	The Dr. Oz Show‡; Anderson; The Doctors
Outstanding Lead Actor in a Drama Series	Anthony Geary as Luke Spencer on General Hospital‡; Maurice Benard as Sonny Corinthos on General Hospital; John McCook as Eric Forrester on The Bold and the Beautiful; Darnell Williams as Jesse Hubbard on All My Children; Robert S. Woods as Bo Buchanan on One Life to Live
Outstanding Lead Actress in a Drama Series	Heather Tom as Katie Logan Spencer on The Bold and the Beautiful‡; Crystal Chappell as Carly Manning on Days of Our Lives; Debbi Morgan as Angie Hubbard on All My Children; Erika Slezak as Victoria Lord on One Life to Live; Laura Wright as Carly Corinthos Jacks on General Hospital
Outstanding Supporting Actor in a Drama Series	Jonathan Jackson as Lucky Spencer on General Hospital‡; Bradford Anderson as Damian Spinelli on General Hospital; Matthew Ashford as Jack Deveraux on Days of Our Lives; Sean Blakemore as Shawn Butler on General Hospital; Jason Thompson as Patrick Drake on General Hospital
Outstanding Supporting Actress in a Drama Series	Nancy Lee Grahn as Alexis Davis on General Hospital‡; Melissa Claire Egan as Annie Lavery on All My Children; Genie Francis as Genevieve Atkinson on The Young and the Restless; Elizabeth Hendrickson as Chloe Mitchell on The Young and the Restless; Rebecca Herbst as Elizabeth Webber on General Hospital
Outstanding Younger Actor in a Drama Series	Chandler Massey as Will Horton on Days of Our Lives‡; Eddie Alderson as Matthew Buchanan on One Life to Live; Chad Duell as Michael Corinthos on General Hospital; Nathan Parsons as Ethan Lovett on General Hospital
Outstanding Younger Actress in a Drama Series	Christel Khalil as Lily Winters on The Young and the Restless‡; Molly Burnett as Melanie Jonas on Days of Our Lives; Shelley Hennig as Stephanie Johnson on Days of Our Lives; Jacqueline MacInnes Wood as Steffy Forrester on The Bold and the Beautiful
Outstanding Game Show Host	Todd Newton on Family Game Night; Ben Bailey on Cash Cab; Wayne Brady on Let's Make a Deal; Meredith Vieira, Who Wants to Be a Millionaire
Outstanding Lifestyle/Culinary Host	Sandra Lee on Semi-Homemade Cooking‡; Rick Bayless on Mexico One Plate at a Time; Nate Berkus, The Nate Berkus Show; Paula Deen, Paula's Best Dishes; Giada De Laurentiis on Giada at Home
Outstanding Performer in a Children's Series	Kevin Clash as Elmo on Sesame Street‡; Dakota Goyo as Josh on R.L. Stine's The Haunting Hour The Series; Leslie Carrara-Rudolph as Abby Cadaby on Sesame Street; Caroll Spinney as Big Bird on Sesame Street
Outstanding Talk Show Host	Regis Philbin and Kelly Ripa on Live! with Regis and Kelly; Anderson Cooper on Anderson; Mehmet Oz on The Dr. Oz Show; Rachael Ray on Rachael Ray; Lisa Masterson, Jillian Michaels, Andrew P. Ordon, Jim Sears, Travis Lane Stork and Wendy Walsh on The Doctors
Outstanding Drama Series Directing Team	General Hospital‡; The Bold and the Beautiful; One Life to Live; The Young and the Restless
Outstanding Drama Series Writing Team	Days of Our Lives‡; All My Children; General Hospital; The Young and the Restless

=== Lifetime Achievement Award ===
- Bill Geddie

== In Memoriam ==
Deidre Hall presented the filmed tribute to the TV artists and producers who died in 2011:

- Jack LaLanne
- Jeff Conaway
- Leonard B. Stern
- Sherwood Schwartz
- David Pressman
- Mary Fickett
- Patricia Breslin
- Sue Mengers
- Judy Lewis
- Nick Santino
- Jonathan Frid
- Dick Clark
- Bob Stewart
- Lee Rich
- Jim Paratore
- Kathryn Joosten
- Ray Bradbury
- Richard Dawson
- Judy Freudberg

=== Special Tributes ===
- All My Children
- One Life to Live
