= Daytime Emmy Award for Outstanding Daytime Talk Series Host =

Annual television award

- Awarded for: Outstanding Daytime Talk Series Host
- Country: United States
- Presented by: National Academy of Television Arts and Sciences
- First award: 1974
- Currently held by: Sherri Shepherd (Sherri)

Highlights
- Most awards: Phil Donahue (The Phil Donahue Show) (9)
- Website: emmyonline.org
- Related: Award was split into Talk Show Host—Informative and Talk Show Host—Entertainment from 2015 to 2022

The Daytime Emmy Award for Outstanding Daytime Talk Series Host, originally called Outstanding Talk Show Host, is an award presented annually by the National Academy of Television Arts and Sciences (NATAS) to honor daytime talk show hosts.

It was first presented as the Outstanding Talk Show Host award at the 1st Daytime Emmy Awards ceremony held in 1974. From the 42nd Daytime Emmy Awards in 2015 to the 49th Daytime Emmy Awards in 2022, the award was divided into two specific categories: Outstanding Informative Talk Show Host, honoring hosts of talk shows that were more informative in nature, and Outstanding Entertainment Talk Show Host, honoring hosts of talk shows that were more entertainment in nature. In 2023, the NATAS merged the two specific categories back into one, under the new official name Outstanding Daytime Talk Series Host.

In the lists below, the winner of the award for each year is shown first, followed by the other nominees.

== 1970s ==
- 1974: Dinah Shore, Dinah's Place
- 1975: Barbara Walters, Today
- 1976: Dinah Shore, Dinah!
- 1977: Phil Donahue, The Phil Donahue Show
- 1978: Phil Donahue, The Phil Donahue Show
- 1979: Phil Donahue, The Phil Donahue Show

== 1980s ==
- 1980: Phil Donahue, The Phil Donahue Show
- 1981: Hugh Downs, Over Easy
- 1982: Phil Donahue, The Phil Donahue Show
- 1983: Phil Donahue, The Phil Donahue Show
- 1984: Gary Collins, Hour Magazine
- 1985: Phil Donahue, The Phil Donahue Show
- 1986: Phil Donahue, The Phil Donahue Show
- 1987: Oprah Winfrey, The Oprah Winfrey Show
- 1988: Phil Donahue, The Phil Donahue Show
- 1989: Sally Jessy Raphael, Sally Jessy Raphael

== 1990s ==
- 1990: Joan Rivers, The Joan Rivers Show
- 1991: Oprah Winfrey, The Oprah Winfrey Show
- 1992: Oprah Winfrey, The Oprah Winfrey Show
- 1993: Oprah Winfrey, The Oprah Winfrey Show
- 1994: Oprah Winfrey, The Oprah Winfrey Show
- 1995: Oprah Winfrey, The Oprah Winfrey Show
- 1996: Montel Williams, The Montel Williams Show
- 1997: Rosie O'Donnell, The Rosie O'Donnell Show
- 1998: Rosie O'Donnell, The Rosie O'Donnell Show and Oprah Winfrey, The Oprah Winfrey Show (tie)
- 1999: Rosie O'Donnell, The Rosie O'Donnell Show

== 2000s ==
- 2000: Rosie O'Donnell, The Rosie O'Donnell Show
- 2001: Regis Philbin, Live with Regis and Rosie O'Donnell, The Rosie O'Donnell Show (tie)
- 2002: Rosie O'Donnell, The Rosie O'Donnell Show
- 2003: Wayne Brady, The Wayne Brady Show
- 2004: Wayne Brady, The Wayne Brady Show
- 2005: Ellen DeGeneres, The Ellen DeGeneres Show
- 2006: Ellen DeGeneres, The Ellen DeGeneres Show
- 2007: Ellen DeGeneres, The Ellen DeGeneres Show
- 2008: Ellen DeGeneres, The Ellen DeGeneres Show
- 2009: Whoopi Goldberg, Joy Behar, Elisabeth Hasselbeck, Sherri Shepherd & Barbara Walters, The View

== 2010–2014 ==
Year	Host(s)	Program	Network	Ref
2010 (37th)
2010 (37th)	Mehmet Oz	The Dr. Oz Show	Syndicated	
2010 (37th)	Bonnie Hunt	The Bonnie Hunt Show	Syndicated	
2010 (37th)	Regis Philbin & Kelly Ripa	Live! with Regis and Kelly	Syndicated	
2010 (37th)	Rachael Ray	Rachael Ray	Syndicated	
2010 (37th)	Whoopi Goldberg, Joy Behar, Elisabeth Hasselback, Sherri Shepherd & Barbara Walters	The View	ABC	
2011 (38th)
2011 (38th)	Regis Philbin & Kelly Ripa (tie)	Live! with Regis and Kelly	Syndicated	
2011 (38th)	Mehmet Oz (tie)	The Dr. Oz Show	Syndicated	
2011 (38th)	Dr. Lisa Masterson, Dr. Andrew Ordon Dr. Jim Sears & Dr. Travis Stork	The Doctors	Syndicated	
2011 (38th)	Rachael Ray	Rachael Ray	Syndicated	
2011 (38th)	Whoopi Goldberg, Joy Behar, Elisabeth Hasselbeck, Sherri Shepherd & Barbara Walters	The View	ABC	
2012 (39th)
2012 (39th)	Regis Philbin & Kelly Ripa	Live! with Regis and Kelly	Syndicated	
2012 (39th)	Anderson Cooper	Anderson	Syndicated	
2012 (39th)	Dr. Lisa Masterson, Jillian Michaels, Dr. Andrew Ordon, Dr. Jim Sears, Dr. Travis Stork & Dr. Wendy Walsh	The Doctors	Syndicated	
2012 (39th)	Rachael Ray	Rachael Ray	Syndicated	
2012 (39th)	Mehmet Oz	The Dr. Oz Show	Syndicated	
2013 (40th)
2013 (40th)	Ricki Lake	The Ricki Lake Show	Syndicated	
2013 (40th)	Anderson Cooper	Anderson	Syndicated	
2013 (40th)	Steve Harvey	Steve Harvey	Syndicated	
2013 (40th)	Mehmet Oz	The Dr. Oz Show	Syndicated	
2013 (40th)	Rachael Ray	Rachael Ray	Syndicated	
2014 (41st)
2014 (41st)	Katie Couric (tie)	Katie	Syndicated	
2014 (41st)	Mehmet Oz (tie)	The Dr. Oz Show	Syndicated	
2014 (41st)	Julie Chen, Sara Gilbert, Sharon Osbourne, Aisha Tyler & Sheryl Underwood	The Talk	CBS	
2014 (41st)	Whoopi Goldberg, Jenny McCarthy, Sherri Shepherd & Barbara Walters	The View	ABC	
2014 (41st)	Rachael Ray	Rachael Ray	Syndicated	

== 2015–2022 ==
The award was split into Talk Show Host—Informative and Talk Show Host—Entertainment.

== 2023–present ==
The two separate Informative and Entertainment awards were merged back into a single Daytime Talk Series Host award.

Year	Host(s)	Program	Network	Ref
2023 (50th)
2023 (50th)	Kelly Clarkson	The Kelly Clarkson Show	Syndicated	
2023 (50th)	Drew Barrymore	The Drew Barrymore Show	Syndicated	
2023 (50th)	Tamron Hall	Tamron Hall	Syndicated	
2023 (50th)	Kelly Ripa and Ryan Seacrest	Live with Kelly and Ryan	Syndicated	
2023 (50th)	Sherri Shepherd	Sherri	Syndicated	
2024 (51st)
2024 (51st)	Mark Consuelos and Kelly Ripa	Live with Kelly and Mark	Syndicated	
2024 (51st)	Joy Behar, Whoopi Goldberg, Alyssa Farah Griffin, Sara Haines, Sunny Hostin, Ana Navarro	The View	ABC	
2024 (51st)	Kelly Clarkson	The Kelly Clarkson Show	Syndicated	
2024 (51st)	Akbar Gbajabiamila, Amanda Kloots, Natalie Morales, Jerry O'Connell, Sheryl Underwood	The Talk	CBS	
2024 (51st)	Tamron Hall	Tamron Hall	Syndicated	
2025 (52nd)	Drew Barrymore	The Drew Barrymore Show	Syndicated	
2025 (52nd)	Jenna Bush Hager and Hoda Kotb	Today with Hoda & Jenna	NBC	
2025 (52nd)	Kelly Clarkson	The Kelly Clarkson Show	Syndicated	
2025 (52nd)	Mark Consuelos and Kelly Ripa	Live with Kelly and Mark	Syndicated	
2025 (52nd)	Jennifer Hudson	The Jennifer Hudson Show	Syndicated	
2026 (53rd)
2026 (53rd)	Sherri Shepherd	Sherri	Syndicated	
2026 (53rd)	Joy Behar, Whoopi Goldberg, Alyssa Farah Griffin, Sara Haines, Sunny Hostin, Ana Navarro	The View	ABC	
2026 (53rd)	Kelly Clarkson	The Kelly Clarkson Show	Syndicated	
2026 (53rd)	Tamron Hall	Tamron Hall	Syndicated	
2026 (53rd)	Jennifer Hudson	The Jennifer Hudson Show	Syndicated	

== Multiple wins and nominations ==
The following individuals received two or more wins in this category:

Wins	Host
9	Phil Donahue
7	Oprah Winfrey
6	Rosie O'Donnell
4	Ellen DeGeneres
3	Mehmet Oz
3	Regis Philbin
3	Kelly Ripa
2	Wayne Brady
2	Sherri Shepherd
2	Dinah Shore

The following individuals received two or more nominations in this category:

Nominations	Host
16	Joy Behar
9	Phil Donahue
7	Sherri Shepherd
7	Oprah Winfrey
6	Whoopi Goldberg
6	Rosie O'Donnell
6	Kelly Ripa
5	Mehmet Oz
5	Rachael Ray
5	Barbara Walters
4	Kelly Clarkson
3	Tamron Hall
3	Elisabeth Hasselback
2	Drew Barrymore
2	Mark Consuelos
2	Alyssa Farah Griffin
2	Sarah Haines
2	Sunny Hostin
2	Jennifer Hudson
2	Dr. Lisa Masterson
2	Dr. Andrew Ordon
2	Dr. Jim Sears
2	Dr. Travis Stork
2	Sheryl Underwood
