= 36th Daytime Emmy Awards =

- Date: August 30, 2009 (Ceremony); August 29 (Creative Arts Awards)
- Location: Orpheum Theatre, Los Angeles, California
- Presented by: National Academy of Television Arts and Sciences
- Hosted by: Vanessa L. Williams

Highlights
- Outstanding Drama Series: The Bold and the Beautiful
- Outstanding Game Show: Cash Cab

Television/radio coverage
- Network: The CW
- Produced by: Associated Television International

The 36th Annual Daytime Emmy Awards were held on Sunday, August 30, 2009, at the Orpheum Theatre, Los Angeles, California, and were televised live on The CW for the first time. The Daytime Entertainment Creative Arts Emmy Awards were presented a day earlier on August 29 at the Westin Bonaventure Hotel.

The televised ceremony was hosted by Vanessa L. Williams, and directed by Jeff Margolis and Debbie Palacio. The nominations were announced on May 14, 2009, partially on The Today Show.

== Nominations and winners ==
The following is a partial list of nominees, with winners in bold:

Category	Winners and nominees
Outstanding Drama Series	All My Children; **The Bold and the Beautiful**; Days of Our Lives
Outstanding Lead Actor in a Drama Series	Daniel Cosgrove (Bill Lewis, Guiding Light); Anthony Geary (Luke Spencer, General Hospital); Thorsten Kaye (Zach Slater, All My Children); **Christian LeBlanc (Michael Baldwin, The Young and the Restless**); Peter Reckell (Bo Brady, Days of Our Lives)
Outstanding Lead Actress in a Drama Series	Jeanne Cooper (Katherine Chancellor, The Young and the Restless); Susan Flannery (Stephanie Forrester, The Bold and the Beautiful); **Susan Haskell (Marty Saybrooke, One Life to Live**); Debbi Morgan (Angie Hubbard, All My Children); Maura West (Carly Snyder, As the World Turns)
Outstanding Supporting Actor in a Drama Series^{1}	Bradford Anderson (Damian Spinelli, General Hospital); **Jeff Branson (Shayne Lewis, Guiding Light**); Van Hansis (Luke Snyder, As the World Turns); **Vincent Irizarry (David Hayward, All My Children**); Jacob Young (JR Chandler, All My Children)
Outstanding Supporting Actress in a Drama Series	**Tamara Braun (Ava Vitali, Days of Our Lives**); Melissa Claire Egan (Annie Lavery, All My Children); Alicia Minshew (Kendall Hart, All My Children); Julie Pinson (Janet Ciccone Snyder, As the World Turns); Bree Williamson (Jessica Brennan, One Life to Live)
Outstanding Younger Actor in a Drama Series	Blake Berris (Nick Fallon, Days of Our Lives); E.J. Bonilla (Rafe Rivera, Guiding Light); **Darin Brooks (Max Brady, Days of Our Lives**); Bryton McClure (Devon Hamilton, The Young and the Restless); Cornelius Smith Jr. (Frankie Hubbard, All My Children)
Outstanding Younger Actress in a Drama Series	**Julie Marie Berman (Lulu Spencer, General Hospital)**; Meredith Hagner (Liberty Ciccone, As the World Turns); Rachel Melvin (Chelsea Brady, Days of Our Lives); Emily O'Brien (Jana Fisher, The Young and the Restless); Kirsten Storms (Maxie Jones, General Hospital)
Outstanding Drama Series Writing Team	All My Children; The Bold and the Beautiful; **General Hospital**; One Life to Live
Outstanding Drama Series Directing Team	All My Children; Days of Our Lives; **One Life to Live**
Outstanding Talk Show Entertainment	Live with Regis and Kelly; **Rachael Ray**; The Ellen DeGeneres Show
Outstanding Talk Show Informative	Dr. Phil; The Doctors; **The Tyra Banks Show**
Outstanding Talk Show Host	Regis Philbin and Kelly Ripa on Live with Regis and Kelly; Rachael Ray on Rachael Ray; **Barbara Walters, Whoopi Goldberg, Joy Behar, Elisabeth Hasselbeck, and Sherri Shepherd** on The View; Ellen DeGeneres on The Ellen DeGeneres Show
Outstanding Legal/Courtroom Program	**Cristina's Court** (syndicated); Family Court with Judge Penny (syndicated); Judge Hatchett (syndicated); Judge Judy (syndicated); The People's Court (syndicated)
Outstanding Morning Program	**Good Morning America (ABC)**; The Early Show (CBS); The Today Show (NBC)
Outstanding Children's Animated Program	The Backyardigans; Curious George; Little Einsteins; Sid the Science Kid; **Word World**
Outstanding Game/Audience Participation Show	**Cash Cab (Discovery)**; Jeopardy! (syndicated); Who Wants to Be a Millionaire
Outstanding Game Show Host	Ben Bailey, Cash Cab (Discovery); Howie Mandel, Deal or No Deal (NBC); Alex Trebek, Jeopardy! (syndicated); **Meredith Vieira, Who Wants to Be a Millionaire (syndicated)**
Outstanding Sound Editing - Live Action and Animation	Robert Hargreaves and George Brooks (Ben 10: Alien Force); **Jake Allston and Michael Petak (Tak and the Power of Juju)**; Thomas Syslo, Timothy J. Borquez, Mark Keatts, Mike Garcia, Mark Keefer, Kelly Ann Foley, Keith Dickens, Tony Orozco, Erik Foreman and Eric Freeman (The Batman); Ryan Araki, Simon Berry, Julia Dalzell and Peter Thillaye (The Future Is Wild); Jeffrey Lesser, Dan Mennella, Steven Rebollido, Dick Maitland, Chris Sassano (Wonder Pets)
Outstanding Sound Mixing - Live Action and Animation	**Robert Hargreaves, Robert Serda and John Hegedes (Ben 10: Alien Force)**; Doug Andham, Eric Freeman and Timothy Borquez (The Batman); Ray Leonard and Michael Beiriger (My Friends Tigger & Pooh); Joel Spector and Kristian Pedregon (From the Top at Carnegie Hall); John Hegedes and Robert Hargreaves (Legion of Super Heroes)
Outstanding Directing in an Animated Program	Jeff McGrath, Scott Heming, Cathy Malkasian and Susan Blu (Curious George); Don MacKinnon, David Hartman and Ginny McSwain (My Friends Tigger & Pooh); **Dave Thomas, Gabe Swarr and Andrea Romano (El Tigre: The Adventures of Manny Rivera)**; Mike Fallows (The Future Is Wild); David SanAngelo (WordGirl)
Outstanding Individual Achievement in Animation	**Eddie Trigueros (El Tigre: The Adventures of Manny Rivera)**; **Gerald de Jesus (El Tigre: The Adventures of Manny Rivera)**; **Larry Murphy (The Mighty B!)**; **Jorge Gutierrez (El Tigre: The Adventures of Manny Rivera)**
Outstanding Special Class Animated Program	**Steve Oedekerk, Jed Spingarn, Paul Marshal, Margaret M. Dean and Kyle Jolly (Back at the Barnyard)**; Brian A. Miller, Sam Register, Glen Murakami, Jennifer Pelphrey and Donna Smith (Ben 10: Alien Force); Richard Gitelson, Roger Bollen, Marilyn Sadler, Scott Dyer, Pamela Lehn, Jocelyn Hamilton and Jane Sobol (Handy Manny)

== Lifetime achievement award ==
- Sesame Street

== Special Tributes ==
- Guiding Light
- Daytime Gives Back, Feed The Children

== List of Presenters ==
Presenter's TV Show	Presenter
All My Children	Melissa Claire Egan (Annie Lavery); Colin Egglesfield (ex-Joshua Madden); Susan Lucci (Erica Kane); Cameron Mathison (Ryan Lavery)
As The World Turns	Van Hansis (Luke Snyder); Jake Silbermann (Noah Mayer)
The Bold and the Beautiful	Katherine Kelly Lang (Brooke Logan); Ronn Moss (Ridge Forrester); Betty White (Ann Douglas); Patrick Duffy (Stephen Logan)
Days of Our Lives	Jay Kenneth Johnson (Philip Kiriakis); James Scott (EJ DiMera)
General Hospital	Bradford Anderson (Damien Spinelli); Anthony Geary (Luke Spencer); Kirsten Storms (Maxie Jones)
Guiding Light	Robert Newman (Josh Lewis); Kim Zimmer (Reva O'Neill); Montel Williams (ex-Clayton Boudreau)
One Life to Live	Kristin Alderson (Starr Manning); Brandon Buddy (Cole Thornhart)
The Young and the Restless	Elizabeth Hendrickson (Chloe Abbott); Billy Miller (Billy Abbot)
The Tyra Banks Show	Tyra Banks
90210	Jennie Garth
Bindi the Jungle Girl	Bindi Irwin
Melrose Place	Lori Loughlin
Dancing with the Stars	Gilles Marini
That's So Raven	Kyle Massey
Zoey 101	Christopher Massey
Dr. Phil	Dr. Phil McGraw
Grey's Anatomy	Sandra Oh
The Rachael Ray Show	Rachael Ray
The Doctors	Dr. Travis Stork
Jeopardy!	Alex Trebek

Notes

A first-place tie was recorded in this category.
