= Sherri Shepherd =

American actress (born 1967)

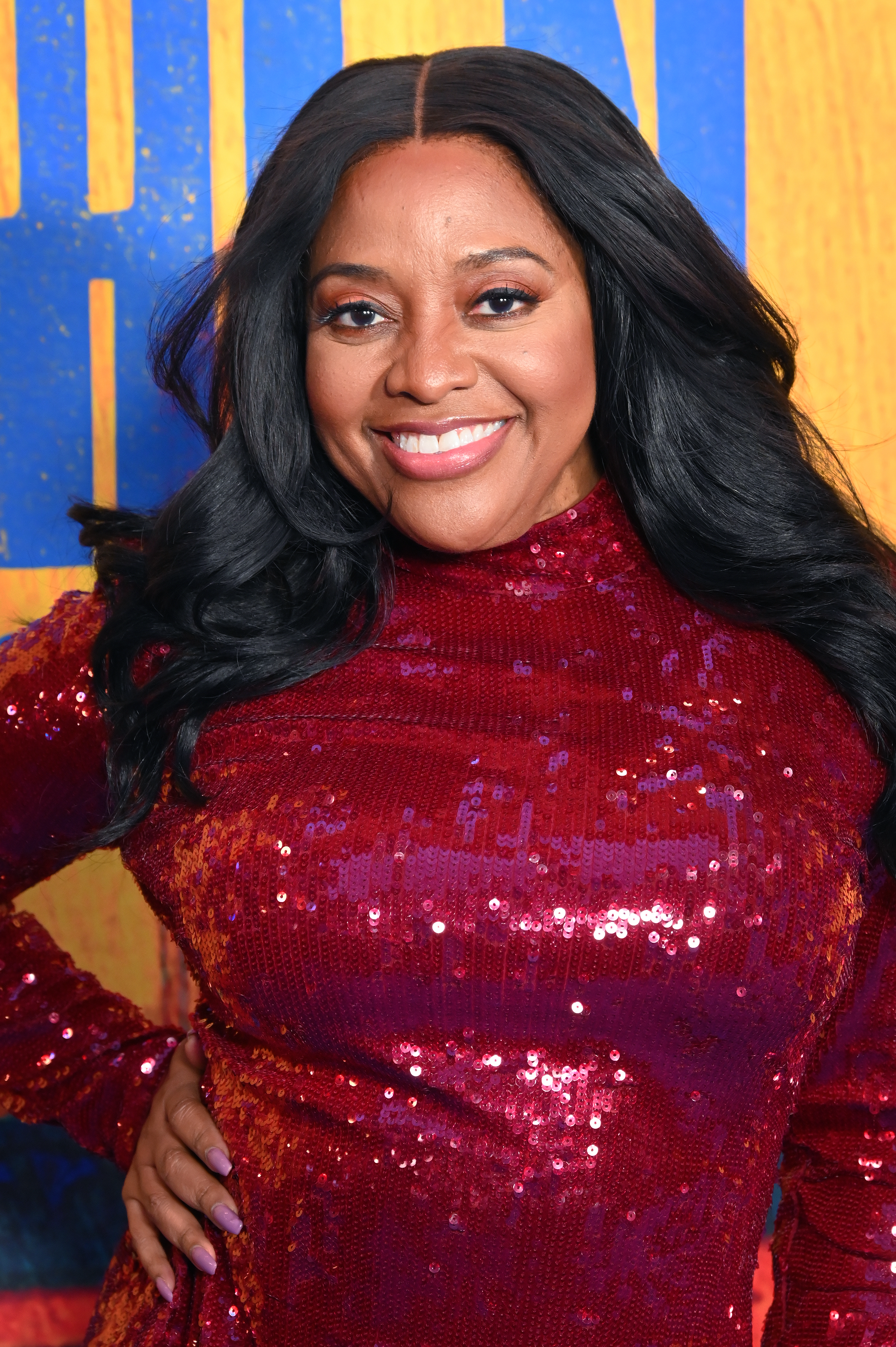
- Shepherd in 2025
- Born: Sherri Evonne Shepherd; April 22, 1967 (age 59); Chicago, Illinois, U.S.
- Occupations: Actress; comedian; author; podcaster; television presenter
- Years active: 1995–present
- Spouses: Jeff Tarpley (m. 2001; div. 2009) Lamar Sally (m. 2011; div. 2015)
- Children: 2
- Website: sherrishepherd.com

Sherri Evonne Shepherd (born April 22, 1967) is an American actress, comedian, author, podcaster, television presenter, and talk show host. From 2007 to 2014, Shepherd was a co-host of the ABC daytime talk show The View, and later hosted the daily syndicated daytime talk show Sherri from 2022 to 2026, earning a Daytime Emmy Award for each program. She also hosted Dish Nation from 2019 to 2022. Her sitcom roles include The Jamie Foxx Show (1999–2001), Less than Perfect (2002–2006), Sherri (2009), Trial & Error (2017–2018), and Mr. Iglesias (2019–2020).

Shepherd portrayed Angie Jordan on the NBC sitcom 30 Rock, appeared in a recurring role on the HBO Max series The Sex Lives of College Girls, and hosted the game show Best Ever Trivia Show. She also appeared as a contestant on the 14th season of the reality competition series Dancing with the Stars.

As an author, she published the 2009 book Permission Slips: Every Woman's Guide to Giving Herself a Break. In 2026, she made her debut as the first female Genie in the Broadway musical Aladdin.

== Early life ==
Shepherd was born in Chicago. She is the eldest of three girls. Her parents are LaVerne (1941-1991) and Lawrence A. Shepherd (born c. 1947). Her parents became Jehovah's Witnesses when Shepherd was a child. Her family moved to Hoffman Estates in 1977, when she was in the sixth grade. She attended Hoffman Estates High School. She worked as a candy striper at Northwestern Hospital and at the now-defunct Sears at Woodfield Mall in the catalog return department. Due to many religious and non-religious issues, her parents divorced when Sherri was very young. Her mother died in 1991, when Sherri was 23.

== Career ==
Shepherd's first television acting job was starring as Victoria Carlson in the short lived sitcom Cleghorne!, which aired for one season on The WB in 1995. She told Ebony in 2018, "That was the first job that I booked and I was still a legal secretary. My agent told me, 'You can quit your job.' I had that big break ... and then it was canceled. I lost my apartment, my car was repossessed and I was homeless for a year. I slept on everybody's couch. In this business, it's very uncertain. You can be working one day and not working the next."

Shepherd later became recognized for her role as Sheila Yarborough on Jamie Foxx's own sitcom The Jamie Foxx Show from 1996 to 2001 and for recurring roles on the sitcoms Suddenly Susan and Everybody Loves Raymond in the late 1990s, while starring in the show Less than Perfect in the lead role of Ramona Platt from 2002 to 2006. From 2005 to 2009, Shepherd had a recurring role as Sandra, the girlfriend of character Lenny Davidson, on the Fox sitcom The War at Home. In 2007, she played Rhonda in the IMAX rerelease version of Transformers. From 2007 to 2013, she had a recurring role as Angie, the wife of character Tracy Jordan, on the NBC sitcom 30 Rock. In 1998, she played in an episode of Friends. In 2009, she starred for one season in Lifetime Television's Sherri, a sitcom about Shepherd's life. She recurred as Daphne during the final season of How I Met Your Mother in 2013. In the same year, Shepherd appeared on Broadway in Rodgers and Hammerstein's musical production of Cinderella. From 2017 to 2018, Shepherd portrayed Anne Flatch in NBC's mockumentary legal comedy series, Trial & Error. She will produce and star in the comedy series pilot Black Don't Crack.

=== Television personality ===
Shepherd has appeared as a guest host and contestant on several television shows such as Who Wants to Be a Millionaire, Rachael Ray, and To Tell the Truth. She co-hosted the 35th Daytime Emmy Awards on June 20, 2008. She became host of the Game Show Network version of The Newlywed Game in 2010, replacing Carnie Wilson, and would host that show until it ended in 2013. Shepherd also hosted Nickelodeon's NickMom Night Out special from 2013 to 2014, Shepherd hosted Best Ever Trivia Show on Game Show Network for 65 episodes, beginning on June 10, 2019. She has appeared regularly as a panelist on Funny You Should Ask since 2017.

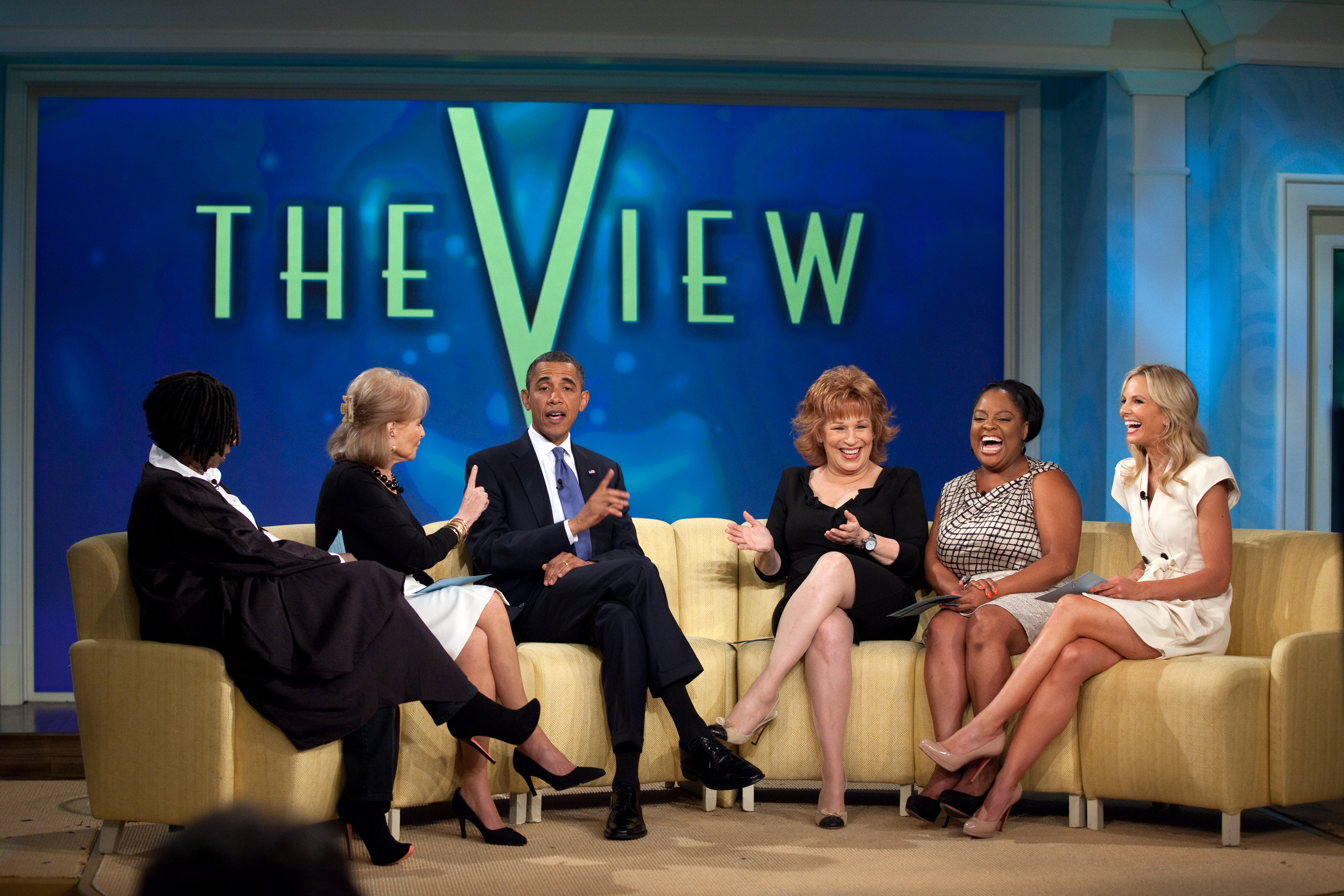
The View's panel (left–right Whoopi Goldberg, Barbara Walters, Joy Behar, Shepherd, and Elisabeth Hasselbeck) interview United States President Barack Obama on July 29, 2010

In 2006, Shepherd became a frequent guest co-host on ABC's daytime talk show The View. She became a permanent co-host in 2007, debuting in September, when she replaced Star Jones. After leaving The View in 2014, Shepherd continued to make several appearances on the show as a contributor throughout 2015 and 2016.

Shepherd encountered public criticism after a September 2007 broadcast of The View when she stated she did not "believe in evolution. Period." Co-host Whoopi Goldberg asked her, "Is the world flat?" Shepherd responded, "I don't know," and expanded that she "never thought about it". Shepherd later referred to her statement as a "brain fart" brought on by nerves. Barbara Walters and Shepherd talked after that episode: Walters said, "Dear, the Earth is round", and Shepherd responded with: "Barbara, I know that!"

The View was often filmed "live", with little or no editing, so more criticism erupted after the December 4, 2007, broadcast when, during a discussion initiated by Joy Behar about Epicurus, Shepherd attempted to assert that Christians existed in classical Greece, and that the Greeks threw them to the lions. When confronted on this point, she further claimed that "Jesus came first" (before Greeks and Romans) and stated, "I don't think anything predated Christians", to which Behar responded: "The Jews."

Shepherd garnered further criticism after admitting to never voting partly due to her upbringing as a strict Jehovah's Witness. She was quoted as saying that she just "never knew the dates or anything"; she stated, "I've never voted for anything in my life." In January 2008, Sherri referred to Gospel singer Shirley Caesar as "the black Patti LaBelle." LaBelle, like Caesar, is black.

In 2008, she created more controversy on The View due to "flippant" remarks regarding abortion. She later clarified her position, saying her remarks weren't meant to be "flippant" but rather to inspire other women who may be dealing with guilt after abortions. She cited having multiple abortions herself in her 20s, which caused her to suffer from shame and guilt due to those experiences. She also revealed she later converted to Evangelical Christianity. In 2009, Shepherd won the Daytime Emmy Award for Outstanding Talk Show Host alongside Behar, Goldberg, Walters, and Elisabeth Hasselbeck.

In March 2012, Shepherd participated as a celebrity contestant on the fourteenth season of ABC's Dancing with the Stars finishing tenth; her dance partner was Val Chmerkovskiy.

In 2019, Shepherd participated in the second season of Fox's The Masked Singer as "Penguin".

From October 2021 to June 2022, Shepherd was among the recurring guest hosts of the syndicated daytime talk show The Wendy Williams Show, as its namesake Wendy Williams had been on an indefinite absence from the program due to her medical issues. On February 22, 2022, the show's distributor Debmar-Mercury announced that Shepherd had been signed on to host a new talk show, Sherri, which premiered in the 2022–23 television season as a replacement for Wendy. The series premiered on September 12. In January 2023, the series was renewed for its second and third seasons through 2025. On February 2, 2026, it was announced that the show was being withdrawn from syndication after four seasons, with the final episode airing on May 21, 2026.

=== Other ventures ===
Shepherd wrote the book Permission Slips: Every Woman's Guide to Giving Herself a Break, published in October 2009. Shepherd also has a co-author credit on Plan D: How to Lose Weight and Beat Diabetes, published in 2013.

Sherri raises funds for the YAI Sherri Shepherd "Believe in Abilities" Fund. YAI supports people of all ages with intellectual and developmental disabilities in achieving the fullest life possible by creating new opportunities for living, loving, working, and learning. YAI is a network of agencies with programs that empower and enhance the lives of thousands of people we support and their families.

In 2009, Shepherd appeared on an episode of WWE SmackDown as the guest manager for professional wrestler MVP, who competed against Dolph Ziggler in a match defending the WWE United States Championship. In 2011, Shepherd offered to pay six months' rent and utilities of homeless former American Gladiators star Debbie Clark (Storm). As of 2015, a project includes a line of wigs and hair add-ins. In October 2026 she will star in the musical Aladdin, making her debut as the first female Genie.

== Personal life ==
Shepherd was married to Jeff Tarpley from 2001 to 2010. They have a son, Jeffrey, born in April 2005. Shepherd became engaged to writer Lamar Sally on December 26, 2010. The couple married in Chicago in August 2011 and separated in May 2014. Following the May 2014 split, Shepherd and Sally welcomed a son, Lamar Jr., via surrogacy in August 2014. However, Shepherd does not have a biological connection to the child, as he was conceived using a donor egg. During the following year, 2015, they finalized their divorce. Along with the initial divorce petition, Shepherd had also challenged the surrogacy contract and sought to remove her name from Lamar Jr.'s birth certificate. A Pennsylvania appeals court ruled against Shepherd, stating she was legally responsible for the child.

Shepherd has type 2 diabetes after having had prediabetes for years. Formerly a Jehovah's Witness, Shepherd is currently an evangelical Christian.

== Awards and nominations ==
=== Emmy Awards ===
Year	Category	Recipient	Outcome
Children's and Family Emmy Awards
2022	Outstanding Voice Performance in a Preschool Animated Program	Blaze and the Monster Machines: "The Fastest of them All"	Nominated
Daytime Emmy Awards
2008	Outstanding Talk Show Host	The View	Nominated
2009	Outstanding Talk Show Host	The View	Won
2010	Outstanding Talk Show Host	The View	Nominated
2011	Outstanding Talk Show Host	The View	Nominated
2014	Outstanding Talk Show Host	The View	Nominated
2023	Outstanding Talk Show Host	Sherri	Nominated
2026	Outstanding Talk Show Host	Sherri	Won

=== NAACP Image Awards Awards ===
Year	Category	Recipient	Outcome
2009	Outstanding Talk Series	The View	Won
2010	Outstanding Talk Series	The View	Nominated
2010	NAACP Image Award for Outstanding Actress in a Comedy Series	Sherri	Nominated
2011	Outstanding Talk Series	The View	Won
2022	Best Lifestyle & Self Help Podcast	Two Funny Mamas	Won
2023	Outstanding Arts & Entertainment Podcast	Two Funny Mamas	Won
2023	Outstanding Talk Series	Sherri	Won
2023	Outstanding Host in a Talk or News / Information (Series or Special) - Individual or Ensemble	Sherri	Nominated
2024	Outstanding Host in a Talk or News / Information (Series or Special)	Sherri	Nominated
2024	Outstanding Talk Series	Sherri	Nominated
2025	Outstanding Talk Series	Sherri	Nominated
2025	Outstanding Host in a Talk or News / Information (Series or Special)	Sherri	Nominated
2025	Outstanding Arts, Sports and Entertainment Podcast	Two Funny Mamas	Won
2026	Outstanding Supporting Actress in a Television Movie, Limited-Series or Special	Straw	Nominated
2026	Outstanding Talk Series	Sherri	Nominated
2026	Outstanding Host in a Talk or News / Information (Series or Special)	Sherri	Nominated

=== Miscellaneous awards and nominations ===
Year	Organization	Category	Recipient	Outcome
2005	BET Comedy Awards	BET Award for Outstanding Supporting Actress in a Comedy Series	Less than Perfect	Nominated
2009	Washington D.C. Area Film Critics Association Awards	Best Cast	Precious	Nominated
2009	Boston Society of Film Critics	Best Ensemble Cast	Precious	Won
2010	Screen Actors Guild Awards	Screen Actors Guild Award for Outstanding Performance by a Cast in a Motion Picture	Precious	Nominated
2010	Actor Awards	Outstanding performance by a Cast in a Motion Picture	Precious	Nominated
2010	Critics' Choice Movie Awards	Best Acting Ensemble	Precious	Nominated
2010	Black Reel Awards	Black Reel Award for Outstanding Ensemble	Precious	Won
2010	Gracie Awards	Gracie Allen Award for Outstanding Female Lead in a Comedy Series	Sherri	Won
2010	Braveheart Award	Powerful Women in Hollywood	Herself	Honored
2013	People's Choice Awards	Favorite Daytime TV Host	The View	Nominated
2017	Canadian Screen Awards	Canadian Screen Award for Best Supporting Actress	Jean of the Joneses	Nominated
2024	People's Choice Awards	The Daytime Talk Shoe	Sherri	Nominated
2025	Hollywood Walk of Fame	Television	Herself	Honored

Media offices
Preceded by Star Jones	The View co-host 2007–2014	Succeeded by Rosie Perez
