= Azadeh Shirazi =

American cosmetic dermatologist

- Education: University of Kentucky
- Known for: Eyeglow procedure
- Medical career
- Profession: American surgeon and dermatologist
- Research: Dermatology

Azadeh Shirazi is an American surgeon and cosmetic dermatologist who has been featured on the DoctorsTV show for being the creator of the Eyeglow procedure. She has authored numerous peer-reviewed journal articles and is also invited on national and local news networks such as Fox News, Cheddar, NewsMax, NBC, KUSI to discuss various medical topics, therapies, and aesthetic trends.

== Education ==
She received her medical doctorate degree from the University of Kentucky and dermatology at the Mayo Clinic and University of California San Diego as well as a Research Fellowship at the Wellman Center for Photomedicine at Harvard Medical School. She was trained at the Harvard University and the Southwestern Medical Center of the University of Texas.
