= Sherri (2009 TV series) =

American television sitcom

- Genre: Sitcom
- Created by: David Flebotte
- Starring: Sherri Shepherd; Tammy Townsend; Malcolm-Jamal Warner; James Avery; Brandon Khalil; Kali Rocha; Elizabeth Regen; Kate Reinders
- Composer: Paul Buckley
- Country of origin: United States
- Original language: English
- No. of seasons: 1
- No. of episodes: 13

Production
- Executive producers: David Flebotte; Nina Wass; Terri Minsky
- Running time: 23 minutes
- Production companies: Faithwalker Productions; Wass-Stein Productions

Original release
- Network: Lifetime
- Release: October 5 – December 1, 2009

Sherri is an American television sitcom starring Sherri Shepherd that ran on Lifetime for one season from October 5, 2009, to December 1, 2009. The show is based on Shepherd's life. The first preview of the show aired on September 4, 2009. Sherri was the first comedy series ever to be owned by Lifetime. The network picked up 12 episodes of the show which were produced in New York by Lifetime.

== Plot ==
Sherri centers around Sherri Robinson (Sherri Shepherd), a newly single mom, paralegal and part-time comedian/actress who tries to get back into the dating scene and move on with her life after divorcing her cheating husband. Sherri finds solace and support among her girlfriends at the office while juggling her hectic life.

== Cast ==
- Sherri Shepherd as Sherri Robinson
- Tammy Townsend as Celia Marson
- Malcolm-Jamal Warner as Kevin Robinson
- Brandon Khalil as Bo Robinson
- Kali Rocha as Summer Dickie
- Elizabeth Regen as Angie Ghilardi

=== Recurring ===
- James Avery as Redmond
- Kate Reinders as Paula Morgan
- Michael Boatman as Dr. Randolph "Randy" Gregg
- Cynthia Caponera as Donna

== Episodes ==
No.	Title	Directed by	Written by	Original release date
1	"Pilot"	Andrew D. Weyman	Dave Flebotte	October 5, 2009
Single mother Sherri Robinson (Sherri Shepherd) juggles caring for her young son Bo and working part-time as a paralegal while pursuing her dream to become a full-time comedian/actress. She splits from her husband Kevin (Malcolm-Jamal Warner) after she discovers his affair and finds solace and support from her girlfriends at the office. Kevin reveals that Paula, the 20-year-old he had an affair with and a fan of Sherri, is pregnant. On the bright side, Sherri's father points out that Bo's pediatrician, Dr. Randy Gregg, seems interested in her. Looking to blow off some steam, Sherri and her co-workers hit a local night club where things are not what they seem.
2	"I Have a Dreamboard"	Andrew D. Weyman	Scott King	October 6, 2009
Sherri hasn’t been able to land an acting role since her breakup with Kevin. When she loses another bit part to her acting nemesis Traci Fabricant (Kym Whitley), Sherri is convinced she’s lost her mojo and throws in the towel. To help her regain it, her co-workers throw her a “dream board” party. Over cocktails at Sherri’s, the women share their innermost dreams and try to get Sherri back on track. Meanwhile, Angie (Elizabeth Regen) is having trouble collecting a Breast Cancer Walk donation from an evasive lawyer in the office.
3	"Thrown for a Hoop"	Gil Junger	Cynthia Caponera	October 7, 2009
When Sherri can’t reach Kevin by phone to confirm he’s picking up a basketball hoop for Bo’s birthday, she tries unsuccessfully, to sneak out of work and buy it. Already overwhelmed, Sherri is asked to take on Celia’s workload when the president of the Minister’s Wives comes to check up on her. To top it off, Sherri is locked out of the office without her purse during a company fire drill. Bo has a "zipper incident" at school which prompts Sherri to bring him in for another visit to Dr. Randy Gregg (Michael Boatman). Sherri finally buys the hoop only to discover Kevin already setting one up with Bo (Brandon Khalil).
4	"Lost Weekend"	Gil Junger	Judd Pillot & John Peaslee	October 8, 2009
Sherri struggles with Bo's first official custody weekend with Kevin, while her girlfriends try to show her the benefits of having time to herself. Angie drags Sherri to a bar, but a call from Bo cuts the night short. Celia takes Sherri to a meditation studio to help her relax, but it has the opposite effect, and Summer throws a party, but Sherri can't focus. She slips out of the party to spy on Kevin and Bo only to find the two nicely bonding. Sherri quietly slips away to do something for herself.
5	"There's No "I" in Church"	Sheldon Epps	Regina Y. Hicks	October 9, 2009
Celia invites Sherri to perform stand-up at a fundraiser she's organizing for her husband's church. When Sherri's routine is a hit and the church elders shower her with praise, Celia starts feeling jealous of the lack of attention on her as the First Lady of the church. Sherri's inflated ego causes Celia's competitive side to come out and she steals Sherri's thunder by singing beautifully on the church stage. Eventually, Celia apologizes for her actions but confesses that she feels like church is her place to shine. Meanwhile, Angie and Summer hatch a plan to get a discount membership at a high-end gym they've both been coveting by pretending to be a couple of lesbians.
6	"Dating Dad"	Gil Junger	Kriss Turner	October 13, 2009
After an awkward first kiss with Dr. Randy Gregg, Sherri decides to stay home instead of returning to dating. Trying to lift his daughter's spirits, Redmond takes Sherri out and coaches her on dating. She musters up the courage to ask Dr. Gregg for a do-over kiss. Meanwhile, Angie has a run-in with one of her partners' daughters.
7	"All in the Timing"	Sheldon Epps	Earl Davis	October 20, 2009
After performing stand up about being newly single, Sherri accepts an offer from Doug (Chris Williams), an old friend who has had a crush on her for years. Sherri finds herself in a predicament about telling Dr. Gregg about her date with Doug, but she ultimately admits to him that she’d like to date other people. Things take a turn for the worse, however, when Doug reveals he’s not over his last relationship and has a complete emotional breakdown. Meanwhile, in order to get some old timecards signed, Donna seeks something in return from Angie and Summer.
8	"Stronger"	Lynn M. McCracken	Mike Weiss	October 27, 2009
Trouble begins to brew for Sherri when the topic of trick-or-treating as a family comes up. Sherri is upset when she keeps running into Kevin's pregnant girlfriend Paula everywhere she goes. Paula reveals that she has been trying to follow in Sherri's footsteps because Kevin says she's the best mother ever. Meanwhile, when Celia and Angie learn that Summer's birthday has always played second fiddle to Halloween, they surprise her with an office party.
9	"Birth"	Ellen Gittelsohn	David Flebotte	November 3, 2009
As Sherri, Summer, Angie and Celia prepare to play tennis, Paula stops by Sherri's apartment to pick up Kevin's birth certificate. Everything goes well until Paula's water breaks in Sherri's apartment and Sherri must rush her to the hospital but Kevin is too far away to be with Paula. At the hospital, Paula's mother, Margo (Jane Curtin), drops in passing judgement on Sherri, Kevin and her daughter who must have an emergency C. Section.
10	"4 Women and a Baby"	Ellen Gittelsohn	Cynthia Caponera	November 10, 2009
After Bo tells her he hates her, Sherri volunteers to watch Julian, Paula’s new baby. Sherri is suddenly summoned to the office to work on a weekend project and must take the baby with her. Sherri, Celia and Angie are not pleased when they learn Summer has brought them in to organize receipts for law partner Bart Peaslee’s (David Rasche) upcoming audit. Although Summer is ecstatic when Peaslee shows up at the office, she insists the ladies hide the baby. Taking care of Julian stirs up the motherhood urge in Sherri once again and prompts one of the ladies to reveal she may be pregnant.
11	"The Game Changer"	John Fortenberry	Tracy Gamble	November 17, 2009
Sherri hosts a game night to introduce Randy to the girls, but things go awry when they both bring a blind date for each other, and Summer wants Angie's date for herself.
12	"Thanks-for-not-for-nothing-giving"	Gary Shimokawa	Scott King	November 24, 2009
Sherri prepares for a quiet, drama-free Thanksgiving with Bo and her father Redmond (James Avery), but a revolving door of unexpected guests derail her plans. Kevin insinuates himself over, Randy arrives unexpectedly and even Paula shows up because baby Julian spikes a fever and needs to see his doctor. Meanwhile at the office, Summer, Angie and Celia pack hot meals for the needy. When the church van is towed, Angie flirts with a handsome cop and convinces him to help deliver meals. Eventually, Summer, Celia, Angie and the cop all end up at Sherris where chaos reigns: Kevin and Randy spar, Redmond resents sharing his potential leftovers with so many guests, and Paula spills the beans and tells Bo that Julian is his brother. Ultimately, Sherri realizes her new big modern family is something to be very thankful for.
13	"Indecision '09"	Leonard R. Garner, Jr.	Terri Minsky	December 1, 2009
Sherri finds herself at a crossroads between re-kindling her relationship with Kevin and starting a new future with Randy. Celia and Angie have differing opinions about whom Sherri should choose. Meanwhile, Bart Peaslee tells Summer he's ready to officially begin their relationship, but first he'd like to spoil and pamper her with a head-to-toe make-over.

== Home media ==
The Complete Season One was released on DVD in Region 1 on April 27, 2010.

== Ratings ==
Season	Episodes	Original Airing			Viewers (in millions)
Season	Episodes	TV season	Season premiere	Season finale	Viewers (in millions)
1	13	2009–2010	October 5, 2009	December 1, 2009	0.859
