= Nita Landry =

American obstetrician, gynecologist, author, and television correspondent

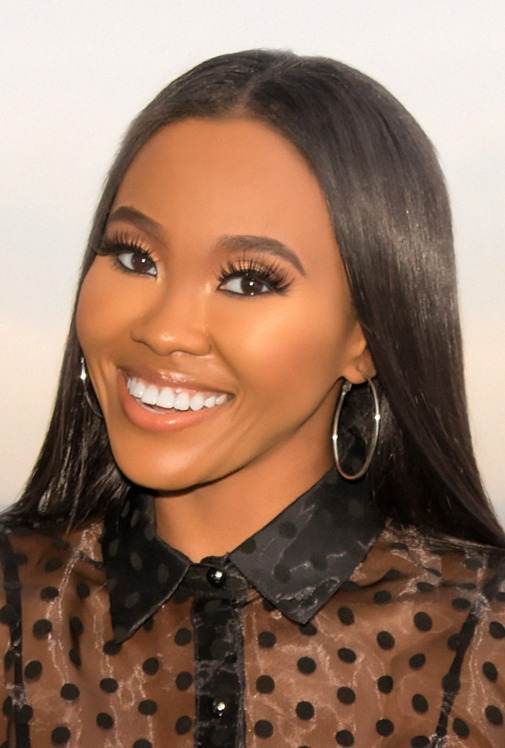
- Landry in 2024
- Born: Alexandria, Louisiana, U.S.
- Education: MD, FACOG
- Alma mater: Dillard University; University of South Alabama
- Occupations: Obstetrician, gynecologist, author, television correspondent

Nita Landry (born Chenita Marie Landry), better known as Dr. Nita, is an American obstetrician and gynecologist (OB/GYN), author, and television correspondent. She co-hosted the daily syndicated talk show The Doctors for several seasons and has made recurring appearances on various national television shows. Landry is a contributor to several women's interest magazines and is a frequent speaker at public engagements related to women's health and public education.

== Early life and career ==
Landry, who was born in Alexandria, Louisiana, is a graduate of Peabody Magnet High School and Dillard University. After graduating with a bachelor's degree in biology, Landry continued her studies at the University of South Alabama, where she earned her medical degree. Landry completed her OB/GYN residency at the University of Louisville.

After completing her training and becoming a board-certified obstetrician and gynecologist, Landry chose to practice medicine as a traveling doctor, rather than taking a traditional role in an established practice. Landry traveled across the US performing vaginal deliveries, gynecological surgeries, and working in clinics. She cared for women from a variety of backgrounds, including disadvantaged youth, women in domestic violence situations, and teenage mothers.

== Television career ==
Landry co-hosted the daytime talk show The Doctors from 2016 to 2020. In the fall of 2020, the show switched to a single-host format, but she returned as a recurring co-host in January 2021. Landry made appearances on various other shows as a medical expert, including Home and Family, Dr. Phil, Today, Access Hollywood, Inside Edition, Good Day L.A., Essence Now's "Health Myths Busted", and Iyanla: Fix My Life. Landry has also appeared on BET and CBS News.

== Other work ==
Landry is a Fellow of the American College of Obstetricians and Gynecologists and is the author of Dr. Nita's Crash Course for Women: Better Sex, Better Health, Better You. She is also an active speaker at public engagements. Landry is committed to educating teens and young adults about issues related to women's health. Landry has addressed topics related to sexual and reproductive health at events like the "Brain Food" lecture series, the 2019 Women's Health Expo, and LadyLike Day at UCLA in 2017. She was also an ambassador for National Women's Health Week in 2018 and 2019. Landry has been featured in various national media outlets, including U.S. News & World Report, Good Morning America, The Atlantic, Cosmopolitan, Health Digest, HuffPost, Shape, and Popsugar magazine.

== Selected publications ==
- Landry, Nita. (2022). Dr. Nita’s Crash Course for Women: Better Sex, Better Health, Better You. New World Library. ISBN 9781608687558
- McGahan, Michele C; Ramos, Gladys A.; Landry, Chenita; Wolfson, Tanya; Sowell, B Brooke; D’Agostini, Deborah; Patino, Cesar; Nelson, Thomas R.; Pretorius, Dolores H. (2008). Multislice Display of the Fetal Face Using 3‐Dimensional Ultrasonography. Journal of Ultrasound in Medicine. Volume27, Issue11. DOI: 10.7863/jum.2008.27.11.1573. PMID 18946096.
