= What If... (web series) =

- Genre: Web series Soap opera
- Directed by: Frank Valentini
- Country of origin: United States
- Original language: English
- No. of seasons: 1
- No. of episodes: 10

Production
- Running time: 5 minutes

Original release
- Network: ABC.com
- Release: July 12 – August 30, 2010

Related
- General Hospital; All My Children; One Life to Live

What If... is an American web series that acts as a crossover among three ABC soap operas: General Hospital, All My Children and One Life to Live. The series explores alternate realities in which a character from one series meets a character from another series. The ten-part series was originally streamed on ABC.com from July 12 to August 30, 2010. It won a Daytime Emmy Award for New Approaches - Daytime Entertainment.

== Production ==
ABC announced that a web series would crossover their three soap operas in June 2010. The first episode was made available on ABC.com on July 12, 2010. One Life to Live executive producer Frank Valentini directed the ten-part series. What If... revolved around characters from two of the three series meeting each other and interacting in a shared alternate reality, not in continuity with any of the series.

== Cast ==
Each episode features two cast members from either General Hospital, All My Children, or One Life to Live. The following is a list of featured cast members.

- Susan Lucci as Erica Kane
- Maurice Benard as Sonny Corinthos
- Laura Wright as Carly Corinthos
- Cameron Mathison as Ryan Lavery
- Steve Burton as Jason Morgan
- Rebecca Budig as Greenlee Smythe
- Kelly Monaco as Sam McCall
- Michael Easton as John McBain
- Trevor St. John as Todd Manning
- Bradford Anderson as Damian Spinelli
- Kassie DePaiva as Blair Cramer
- Michael E. Knight as Tad Martin
- Dominic Zamprogna as Dante Falconeri
- Bree Williamson as Tess Buchanan
- Debbi Morgan as Angie Hubbard
- Darnell Williams as Jesse Hubbard
- Kristen Alderson as Starr Manning
- Kirsten Storms as Maxie Jones
- John-Paul Lavoisier as Rex Balsom
- Erika Slezak as Viki Lord
- Anthony Geary as Luke Spencer

== Episodes ==
| No. | Title | Directed by | Written by | Original release date |
|---|---|---|---|---|
| 1 | "Sonny and Erica: Love in a Time of Claustrophobia" | Frank Valentini | Sara Saedi | July 12, 2010 |
| 2 | "Ryan and Carly: How to be Bad" | Frank Valentini | Sara Saedi | July 12, 2010 |
| 3 | "Todd and Spinelli:Fear of Flying" | Frank Valentini | Sara Saedi | July 12, 2010 |
| 4 | "Jason and Greenlee: Blame it on the Alcohol" | Frank Valentini | Sara Saedi | July 19, 2010 |
| 5 | "Angie & Jesse and Starr: Why Did I Get Married?" | Frank Valentini | Sara Saedi | July 26, 2010 |
| 6 | "Dante and Tess: I Might Like You Better If We Slept Together" | Frank Valentini | Sara Saedi | August 2, 2010 |
| 7 | "Luke and Viki: Pain in My Heart" | Frank Valentini | Sara Saedi | August 9, 2010 |
| 8 | "Rex and Maxie: Learning to Fly" | Frank Valentini | Sara Saedi | August 16, 2010 |
| 9 | "Tad and Blair: I Suck at Love" | Frank Valentini | Sara Saedi | August 23, 2010 |
| 10 | "John and Sam: Love in an Elevator" | Frank Valentini | Sara Saedi | August 30, 2010 |
