= Elisabeth Hasselbeck =

American television personality (born 1977)

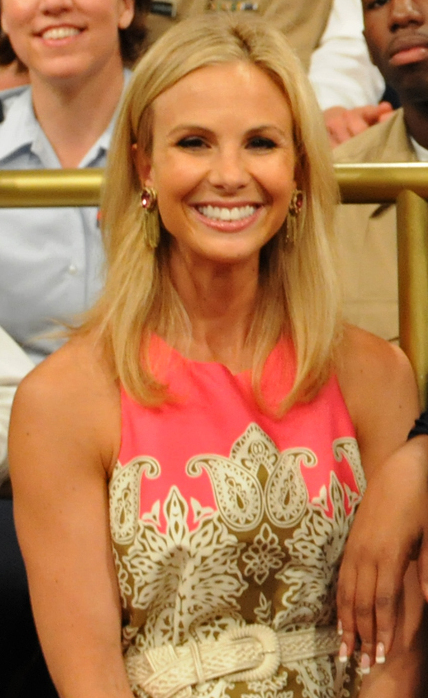
- Hasselbeck in 2010
- Born: Elisabeth DelPadre Filarski; May 28, 1977 (age 49); Cranston, Rhode Island, U.S.
- Education: Boston College (BFA)
- Occupations: Television personality; talk show host
- Years active: 2001–2015, 2019–present
- Spouse: Tim Hasselbeck (m. 2002)
- Children: 3

Elisabeth DelPadre Hasselbeck (née Filarski; born May 28, 1977) is an American television personality and talk show host. She rose to prominence in 2001 as a contestant on the second season of the American version of Survivor, where she finished in fourth place. She married NFL player Tim Hasselbeck the following year.

From 2003 to 2013, Hasselbeck appeared as a co-host on the ABC daytime talk show The View, where she became known for her conservative views on sociopolitical issues. With her co-hosts Joy Behar, Rosie O’Donnell, Whoopi Goldberg, Sherri Shepherd, and Barbara Walters, she was awarded the Daytime Emmy Award for Outstanding Talk Show Host during the 36th Daytime Emmy Awards in 2009. Thereafter, Hasselbeck was a co-host on Fox & Friends from 2013 to 2015.

== Early life and education ==
Hasselbeck was born Elisabeth DelPadre Filarski on May 28, 1977, in Cranston, Rhode Island. She is the daughter of architect Kenneth Filarski and school teacher and lawyer Elizabeth DelPadre; her conservative views contrast those of her parents, who are liberals. She has a younger brother, Kenneth Jr. Their father is of Polish descent and their mother is of Italian descent. She attended St. Mary Academy in East Providence, where she graduated in 1995.

Hasselbeck attended Boston College, where she captained the women's softball team for two seasons, winning consecutive Big East championships. With concentrations on large scale paintings and industrial design, Hasselbeck graduated with a BFA in 1999. Hasselbeck started working for Puma in 1998, while attending Boston College. After graduation, she worked for Puma shoes as a member of its design team before her television career.

== Survivor ==
=== The Australian Outback ===
In 2000, Hasselbeck (then Elisabeth Filarski) was cast in Survivor: The Australian Outback, and was originally a member of the Kucha tribe alongside Rodger Bingham, Nick Brown, Alicia Calaway, Debb Eaton, Kimmi Kappenberg, Michael Skupin, and Jeff Varner.

Filarski took on a 'cheerleader' role in the tribe, which made many people like her, particularly Bingham as the two formed a close friendship. Filarski avoided being voted out at the first Tribal Council, which her tribe attended. The Kucha tribe then went on a winning streak and lost once again on day fifteen. They voted out Kappenberg. On day seventeen, Skupin fell into the campfire and had to be medically evacuated.

Skupin's evacuation led to the Kucha and Ogakor tribes merging. There were five members each. Filarski lasted almost nine hours in the first individual immunity challenge. Contestants had to stand on a perch in the water for as long as possible, but lost. At the first tribal council, former Kucha member Varner was eliminated in a 5–5 tie. This was due to previous votes cast against him. This led to another Kucha member Alicia being voted out and sent to the jury.

Filarski was next on the block when the biggest threat in her original tribe, Brown, won immunity. She swayed the votes of Ogakor members Tina Wesson and Colby Donaldson her way, and had Jerri Manthey voted out. However the former Ogakor would continue dominating the game when they voted out Brown at the final seven, but she and Bingham managed to survive once again after she convinced the Ogakor alliance to vote out their own member Amber Brkich.

At the final five, her closest ally throughout the entire game, Rodger Bingham, was voted out. She then became the sole remaining Kucha member and was voted out next on day 39, receiving fourth place and becoming the sixth jury member.

At the final tribal council, Filarski voted for Wesson to win over Donaldson. Wesson went on to win the season in a 4–3 vote.

=== Post-show ===
She was one of two people who were asked to return for Survivor: All-Stars and declined, the other being Colleen Haskell of Survivor: Borneo.

== Television career ==
Hasselbeck was a judge at the Miss Teen USA 2001 pageant. From 2002 to 2003, she hosted the Style Network's The Look for Less where she helped find stylish clothes for bargain prices.

=== 2003–13: The View ===
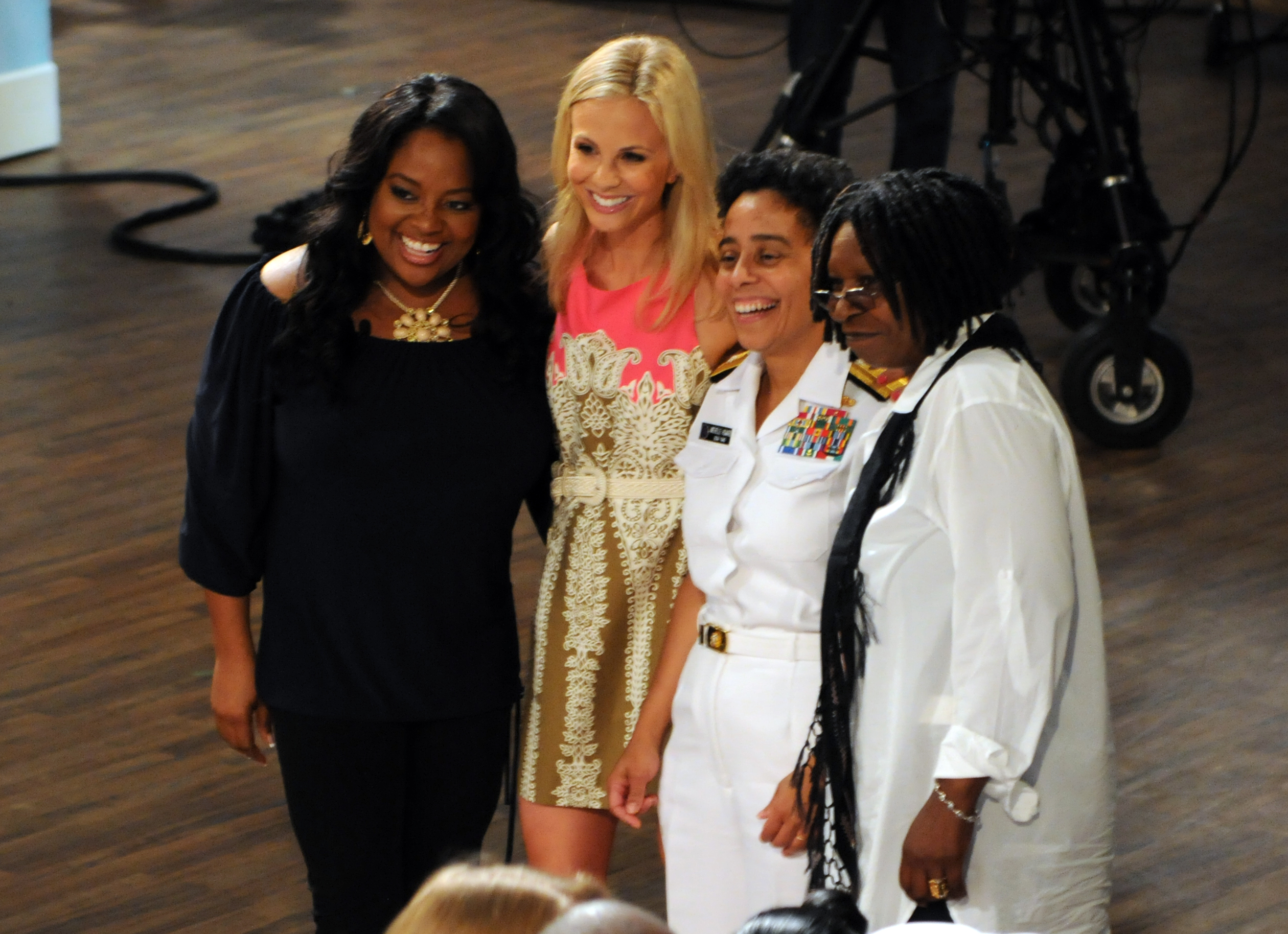
Elisabeth Hasselbeck (second from left), Sherri Shepherd and Whoopi Goldberg pose for a photograph with U.S. Navy Rear Admiral Michelle Howard during Fleet Week, New York 2010.

Although Hasselbeck previously saw herself as a "behind the scenes" kind of person and not interested in a career in television, or playing pundit, her agent was eager to showcase her competitive client and she auditioned for The View in 2003. Hasselbeck was one of a number of women who guest-hosted to replace outgoing The View co-host Lisa Ling, who left the show at the end of 2002. She became a permanent co-host on November 24, 2003.

Hasselbeck typically represented the conservative position on The View.

On August 2, 2006, Hasselbeck got into a heated debate in which she strongly opposed the Food and Drug Administration's plan to sell the "morning-after pill" as an over-the-counter drug. Hasselbeck stated, "I believe that life begins at the moment of conception." She said the over-the-counter distribution of the pill should be banned even in cases of rape and incest, because "life still has value." Hasselbeck argued that advocates of the drug use the "rape or incest" exception as a "bait-and-switch" distraction from the goal of making it universally accessible. She argued that if the "rape or incest" exception were all advocates cared about, they would not support its over-the-counter status. On air, moderator Barbara Walters advised Hasselbeck to calm down after she became emotional about the topic. When the live show went to a commercial break, Hasselbeck ripped up her cue cards and stormed off the set. In an expletive-laden off-air conversation picked up on a live mic, Hasselbeck explained to co-host Joy Behar that she did not appreciate being reprimanded on live TV by Walters for being passionate about the topic. She threatened to quit, but producer Bill Geddie convinced her to come back to the set. As the show came back from the break, Walters and Elisabeth appeared together on a couch, awkwardly making up for the situation. Hasselbeck hugged Walters, sat on her lap, and ended up backing off from her threat to quit.

On May 23, 2007, Hasselbeck was involved in a heated on-air argument with co-host Rosie O'Donnell concerning the war in Iraq, which she supported and O'Donnell opposed. When O'Donnell asked, "655,000 Iraqi civilians dead. Who are the terrorists?" O'Donnell was criticized by conservative commentators (including Fox News anchor Bill O'Reilly) for her question and she (O'Donnell) complained about Hasselbeck's unwillingness to defend O'Donnell's statements in the controversy that followed. Hasselbeck responded "defend your own insinuations," adding that she should not have to defend anyone else's words for them, especially when that person has a forum in which to present a defense.

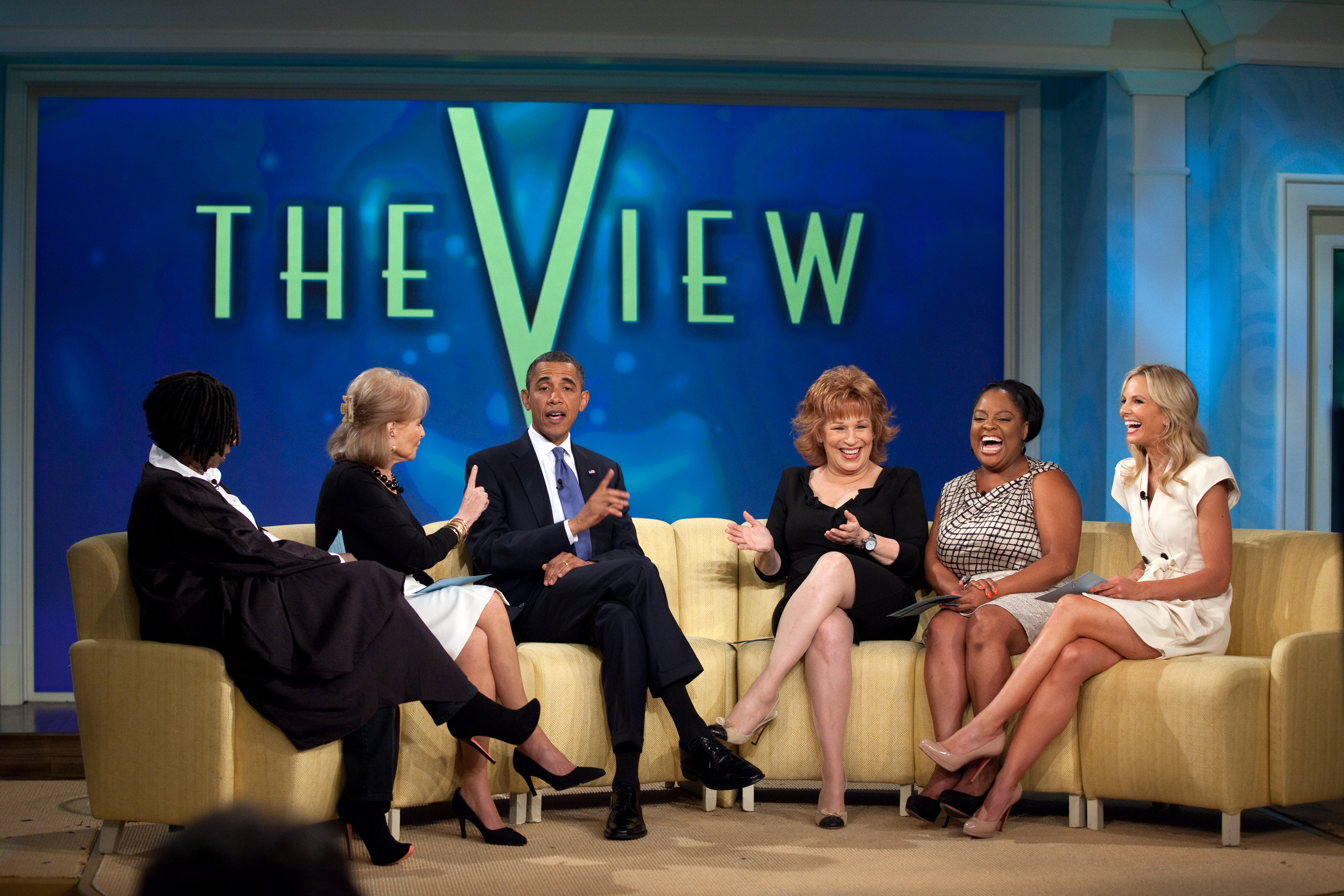
The View's panel (L–R: Whoopi Goldberg, Barbara Walters, Joy Behar, Sherri Shepherd, and Hasselbeck) interview United States President Barack Obama on July 29, 2010.

In August 2009, Hasselbeck, along with her co-hosts Goldberg, Joy Behar, Sherri Shepherd, and Barbara Walters, won the Daytime Emmy Award for Outstanding Talk Show Host. It follows over a decade of nominations for The View with no win. None of the co-hosts of the show was in Los Angeles to collect the award. For the first time, the show had not been nominated for both Outstanding Talk Show and Outstanding Talk Show Host.

On March 8, 2013, there were widespread media reports that Hasselbeck was going to be fired from the show, effective at the end of the season, allegedly because of market research polling that showed viewers thought her views were too conservative. However, on the March 11, 2013, episode of the show, Walters said that the rumors were "particularly false" and that there are "no plans for Elisabeth to leave this show".

On July 9, 2013, ABC confirmed that Hasselbeck would be leaving The View to join Fox & Friends. Her last day on The View was on July 10, 2013.

Since departing, Hasselbeck returned on May 15, 2014, along with other former co-hosts to celebrate Barbara Walters' retirement. She returned to the show as a guest on March 26, 2019, where she confirmed for the first time that she had been fired in 2013. On March 11, 2020, Hasselbeck served as a guest co-host. She also returned in August 2022 as a guest-co-host, as part of the show's 25th anniversary season, in which former hosts made return appearances.

=== 2013–15: Fox & Friends ===
On September 16, 2013, Hasselbeck joined the Fox News morning show, Fox & Friends as a co-host, replacing Gretchen Carlson. By that November, the show's ratings had grown by 9 percent, and increased 10 percent in viewership among people ages 25–54. In November 2015, Hasselbeck announced that she would retire and leave Fox & Friends at the end of the year in order to spend more time with her family, saying she wanted to "give them the best of me, not the rest of me". Her final day with Fox News was on December 22, 2015.

== Personal life ==
On July 6, 2002, Hasselbeck married her college boyfriend, professional football quarterback Tim Hasselbeck. They have a daughter, Grace Elisabeth (born in 2005), and two sons, Taylor Thomas (born in 2007), and Isaiah Timothy (born in 2009).

Hasselbeck is a Christian and no longer identifies as Catholic. In August 2014 she condemned the persecution of Christians in Iraq, as well as the removal of Bibles from hotel rooms in the United States.

Hasselbeck is a Republican and was a speaker at the Republican National Conventions in both 2004 and 2008. On October 26, 2008, Hasselbeck appeared at Republican rallies in Florida, introducing vice presidential candidate Sarah Palin.

Hasselbeck is a supporter of breast cancer awareness initiatives in the form of an Internet-only public service announcement on breast cancer diagnosis.

=== Celiac disease ===
Hasselbeck has celiac disease. She has written a book on the subject, The G-Free Diet: A Gluten-Free Survival Guide, which has appeared on several best-seller lists. On June 23, 2009, a lawsuit was filed in a federal court in Massachusetts alleging that her book was plagiarized from a self-published book by Susan Hasset. Hasselbeck released a statement calling the allegations baseless. The lawsuit was dismissed in November 2009 when the plaintiff's lawyer declined to pursue it, saying to the press that he believed some degree of plagiarism occurred, but it was not sufficient to justify monetary damages. In 2011, Hasselbeck introduced NoGii, her line of gluten-free nutritional products for children and adults.

== Filmography ==
| Year | Title | Role | Notes |
|---|---|---|---|
| 2001 | Survivor: The Australian Outback | Contestant | Eliminated; 4th place |
| 2002-03 | The Look for Less | Host | Season 1 |
| 2003-13 | The View | Co-Host | Daytime Emmy Award for Outstanding Talk Show Host |
| 2013-15 | Fox & Friends | Co-Host | |

== Published works ==
- The G-Free Diet: A Gluten-Free Survival Guide (2008) ISBN 9781599951898
- Deliciously G-Free: Food So Flavorful They'll Never Believe It's Gluten-Free (2012) ISBN 9780345529381
- Point of View: A Fresh Look at Work, Faith, and Freedom (2019, WaterBrook; ISBN 978-0525652762)

== See also ==
- List of people diagnosed with celiac disease

Media offices
| Preceded by Lisa Ling | The View co-host 2003–2013 | Succeeded by Jenny McCarthy |
