= Andrew P. Ordon =

American surgeon, TV host (born 1950)

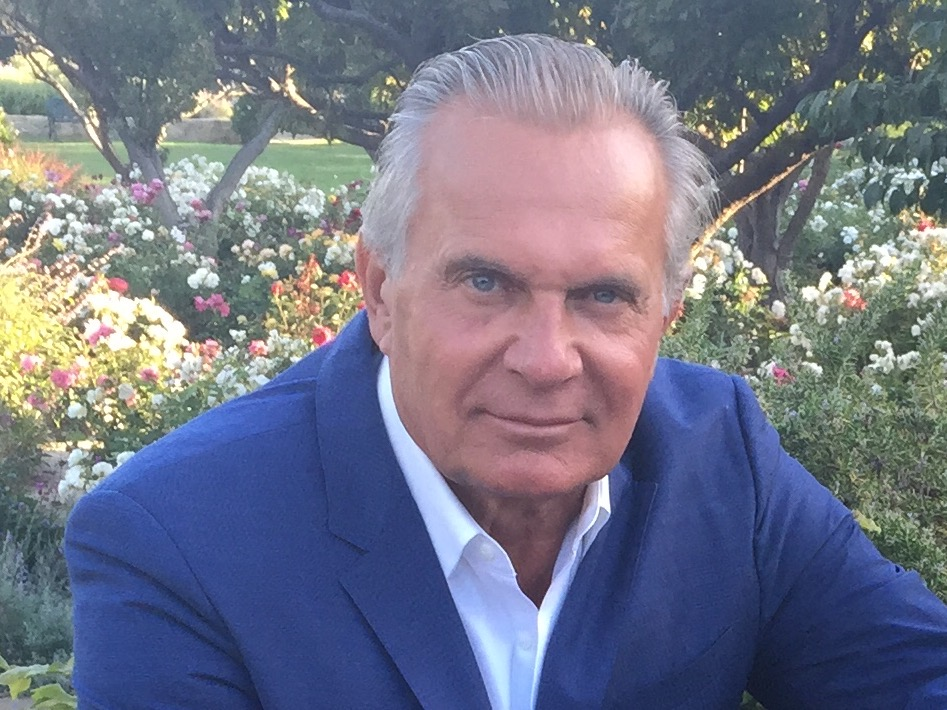
- Born: December 9, 1950 (age 75); Chicago, Illinois, United States
- Education: University of California, Irvine; USC Keck School of Medicine
- Occupations: Plastic surgeon, talk show host
- Spouse: Robyn L. Meyerhoff (m. 1985)
- Children: 2
- Website: ordonchopra.com

Andrew Paul Ordon, M.D., F.A.C.S., ABPS, ASPS, sometimes billed as Dr. Drew Ordon, (born December 9, 1950) is an American plastic surgeon and an Emmy-nominated co-host of the award-winning talk show The Doctors.

== Biography ==
=== Education ===
Ordon was born in Chicago and raised in Long Beach, California. He attended Woodrow Wilson High School in Long Beach California where he was class vice president and played on Varsity football and track.

He graduated with a bachelor's degree from the University of California, Irvine in 1972 and received his medical degree from the University of Southern California School of Medicine (now the Keck School of Medicine of USC) in 1979. After a surgical internship at the Los Angeles County+USC Medical Center, Ordon completed residencies at LAC+USC Medical Center as well as White Memorial Medical Center in Los Angeles and Lenox Hill Hospital in New York City. Ordon completed his fellowship in Aesthetic Surgery at the Beverly Hills Medical Center.

== Career ==
Ordon is the founder of the plastic surgery institute, Beverly Hills and Rancho Mirage, California and Dubai.

Ordon is a diplomate of the American Board of Plastic Surgery, the American Board of Otolaryngology, the American Board of Cosmetic Surgery and the National Board of Medical Examiners. Ordon is affiliated with Cedars-Sinai Medical Center in Los Angeles and Eisenhower Medical Center in Rancho Mirage, California. He currently practices in Beverly Hills and Rancho Mirage, California.

Ordon formerly served as an assistant clinical professor of plastic surgery at the David Geffen School of Medicine at UCLA in Los Angeles. Currently, he is serving as an Associate Professor of Surgery and Co-Director of the Aesthetic Surgery Fellowship at the Keck School of Medicine of USC. He previously held faculty positions at the University of Connecticut Health Center and the New York Medical College.

He is also the founding Partner of LASER AWAY INC, an aesthetic medical spa chain. He is also the President of Los Angeles Society of Plastic Surgeons, and their Board of Directors.

He has been spokesman of beauty products such as Crepe Erase Skincare, Wonder Bra, Fill and Freeze Skincare and Brazilian Butt by Beach Body.

Ordon has appeared in media outlets, including magazines such as Harper’s Bazaar Arabia and NewBeauty, where he shares his insights on the latest trends in cosmetic surgery. In his interviews, Ordon has often discussed how beauty ideals are shaped by both personal perception and societal influences, including the role of social media and celebrities like Kylie Jenner in shaping beauty trends. He has also emphasized the significance of self-care, including early use of Botox and regular sunscreen application, to maintain a youthful appearance over time.

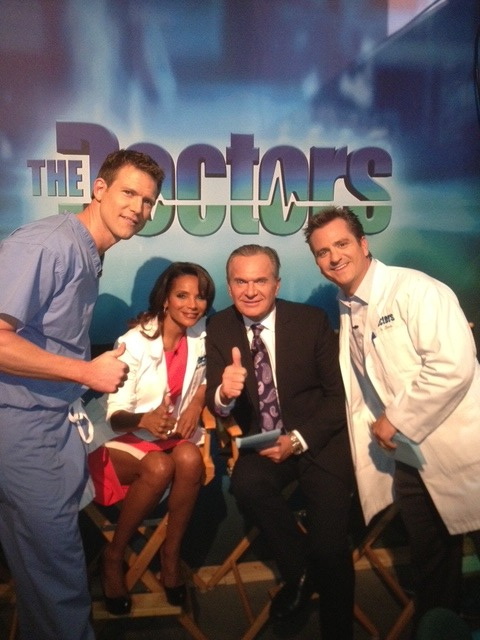
Ordon at The Doctors backstage Paramount Studios.

=== Television ===
Ordon's television appearances as a medical and plastic surgery expert date back to the 1980s. In 2007 he became a regular guest of Dr. Phil McGraw on the Dr. Phil talk show. In 2008 Ordon was selected by McGraw as a host for The Doctors, a talk show produced by McGraw. On The Doctors Ordon discusses plastic surgery as well as skin care, anti-aging techniques and other well-being topics.

The program is syndicated in over 140 countries, has taped about 2000 episodes, and reaches an average 1.15 million daily viewers in the US. The show has been nominated for a Daytime Emmy Award six times, winning for Outstanding Talk Show/Informative in 2010. Ordon, together with his co-hosts, received Outstanding Talk Show Host nominations in 2011 and 2012.

Other recent television appearances made by Ordon include the Daytime Emmy Awards, the Rachael Ray Show, The Early Show, The Wendy Williams Show, Studio One and on the Fox News Channel, and a guest appearance on the Adult Swim faux talk show, The Eric Andre Show.

=== Philanthrophy ===
Ordon is a founding member of the Surgical Friends Foundation, a non-profit organization that provides free surgical procedures to burn victims, abuse victims, people born with birth defects and others who cannot otherwise afford needed reconstructive surgery in the US and countries including Jordan and Haiti. Ordon has also worked with Smile Train, providing cleft lip and palate repairs.

== Selected publications ==
- Ordon, Andrew (2012). Better in 7 : the ultimate seven-day guide to a better you!. Los Angeles, CA: Bird Street Books. ISBN 978-0985462703.

== Personal life ==
He is married to former Wilhelmina model, now a designer and developer lives in Sonoma County and New York City.

Ordon has two children. His son, Matt, is a practicing neurosurgeon and spine surgeon in Boston, MA, and his daughter, Sharon, is a forensic psychiatrist practicing in Marin County, CA.

In 2011, a Golden Palm Star on the Palm Springs, California, Walk of Stars was dedicated to him.
