= Anderson Live =

American syndicated talk show (2011–2013)

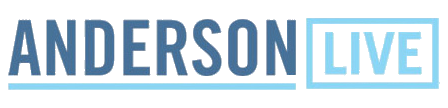
- Also known as: Anderson (2011–12)
- Genre: Talk show
- Presented by: Anderson Cooper
- Country of origin: United States
- Original language: English
- No. of seasons: 2
- No. of episodes: 320

Production
- Executive producer: Anderson Cooper
- Running time: 42 minutes
- Production companies: StrongChild Productions; Telepictures Productions

Original release
- Network: Syndication
- Release: September 12, 2011 – May 20, 2013

Anderson Live, known in its first season as Anderson, is an American syndicated talk show that was hosted by CNN anchorman Anderson Cooper, who also served as executive producer in his first foray into daytime talk television. It debuted on September 12, 2011, and was distributed by Warner Bros. Television in the United States and Canada. The series' final new episode aired on May 20, 2013, with reruns continuing until September 2013.

== History ==
=== 2010–12: Anderson ===
In September 2010, it was announced that Cooper had signed a deal with Warner Bros. and Telepictures to host a nationally syndicated talk show. As part of negotiations over the talk show deal, Cooper signed a new multi-year contract with CNN to continue as the host of Anderson Cooper 360°. According to Cooper, the program would be a lot different from AC360°, saying that it's "not a news program," and he added that "We think this will be the only show on the air that covers a broad spectrum of topics." However, in December 2011 the program was declared a "news program" by the Federal Communications Commission at the insistence of the show's producers to exclude it from equal time provisions ahead of the 2012 presidential election cycle. The show was taped at Jazz at Lincoln Center's The Appel Room, inside Manhattan's Time Warner Center, the complex where Cooper also hosts AC 360°.

=== 2012: Anderson Live ===
After the first season, it was announced that the show would be relocated to the CBS Broadcast Center for season two, moving into Studio 42 where The Nate Berkus Show was taped prior to its cancellation. On July 31, 2012, it was also announced that an "overhaul" of the show would start in the second season, with the series being renamed Anderson Live and a switch to a format featuring a live studio audience, interactive social media and adding guest co-hosts, a formula that worked well in the May 2012 ratings sweeps.

=== Cancellation ===
On October 29, 2012, it was announced that Anderson Live would not return for a third season; it aired new episodes until May 2013.

== See also ==
- Anderson Cooper 360°
