= Wendy Walsh =

Canadian author, lecturer, radio host and television commentator

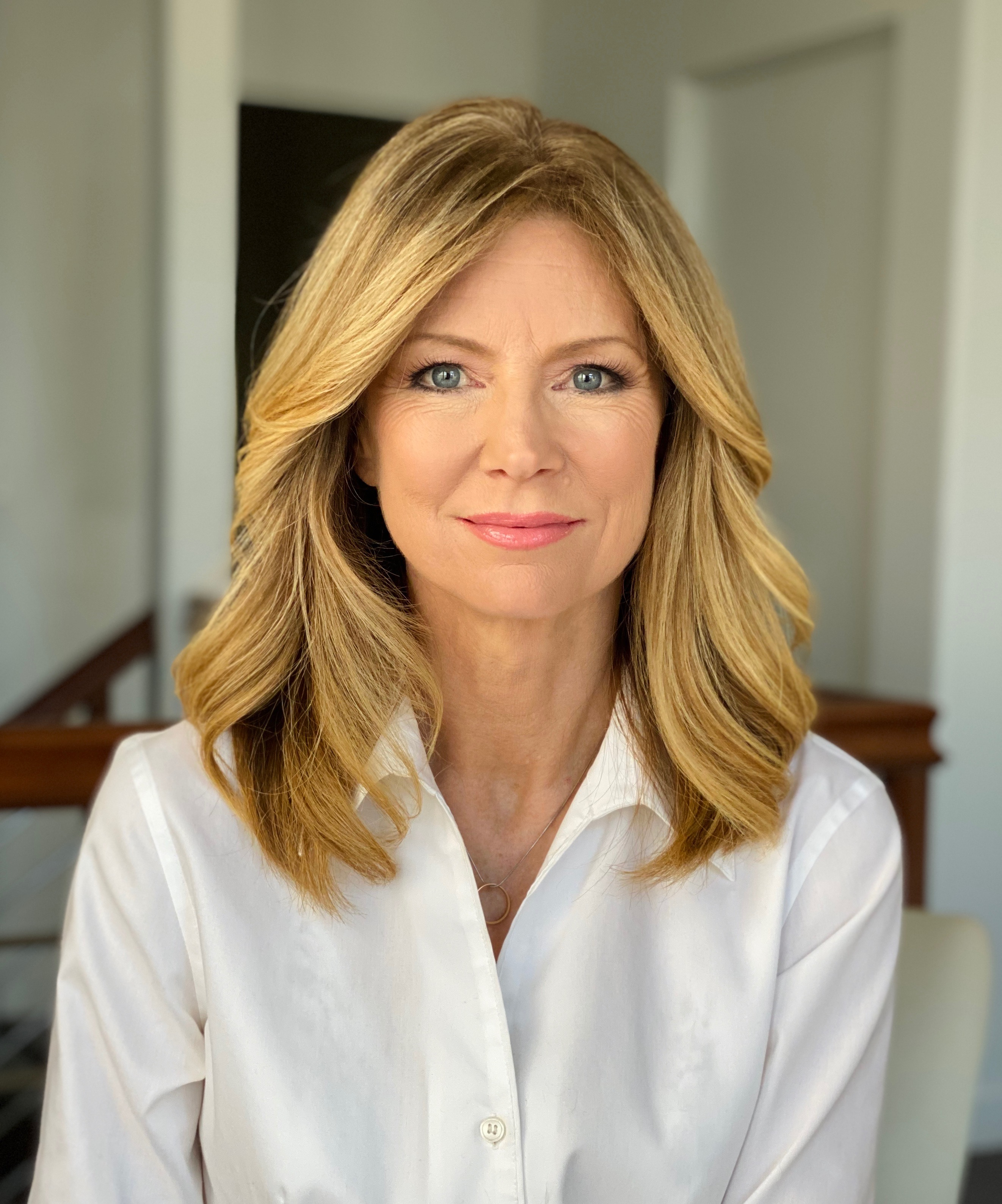
- Born: Wendy Lee Walsh; April 30, 1962 (age 64); Halifax, Nova Scotia, Canada
- Other name: Wendy L. Walsh
- Education: Toronto Metropolitan University, (BA Journalism, 1987), California Graduate Institute (MA Psychology, 2002), (Ph.D Clinical Psychology, 2006)
- Occupations: Journalist, lecturer, author, actress, television commentator, social media influencer.
- Spouse: Julio Caro
- Children: 2
- Website: Dr. Wendy Walsh

Wendy Lee Walsh (born April 30, 1962) is a Canadian author, lecturer, radio host and television commentator.

Walsh's family is from Prince Edward Island; however, she grew up in various places throughout Canada as a result of her father's service in the Royal Canadian Navy. Walsh moved to Los Angeles shortly after graduating from Ryerson University (now Toronto Metropolitan University) in Toronto, Ontario. She holds dual Canadian and American citizenship. Walsh holds an MA and PsyD in clinical psychology from California Graduate Institute (now part of the Chicago School of Professional Psychology).

== Career ==
Walsh is a lecturer for the Psychology program at California State University, Channel Islands, where she teaches Developmental Psychology and Psychology of Health Counseling.

Walsh earned her PhD in clinical psychology from the California Graduate Institute in 2006. The California Graduate Institute (CGI) was founded in 1968 as an independent graduate school specializing in psychology, marital and family therapy, and psychoanalysis. CGI and The Chicago School of Professional Psychology formally announced in fall 2008 that they were uniting.

=== Television and radio ===
Walsh began her television career in the early 1990s in Los Angeles as a news reporter for the city's UPN affiliate. Walsh also served as a west coast correspondent for NBC's Weekend Today show.

In 1995 and 1996, Walsh was a correspondent and occasional anchor on the entertainment television news program, Extra, appearing on over 200 episodes. She also co-hosted How'd They Do That? on The Learning Channel (now TLC).

Walsh appeared on several reality television shows and pilots in the 1990s and 2000s on various cable networks.

In 2011, Walsh appeared on The Doctors as a co-host and panelist for the fourth season, in which the show was nominated for an Emmy Awards.

In 2012, she was a featured commentator providing a psychological analysis into the fictional character Chris Peterson on the DVD box set edition from the TV show Get a Life.

Since 2015, Walsh has hosted The Dr. Wendy Walsh Show on AM radio station KFI in Los Angeles.

== Controversy ==
In 2013, Wendy Walsh was a guest on The O'Reilly Factor. She claimed that after she declined an invitation to his hotel suite, he reportedly turned her down as a contributor for his program. This contributed to allegations of sexual misconduct against Bill O'Reilly.

Walsh is part of the #MeToo movement and has been the subject of substantial press coverage. In 2017, she was named as one of the "Silence Breakers" for Time's Person of the Year.

== Books and publications ==
Walsh is the author of The 30-Day Love Detox: Cleanse Yourself of Bad Boys, Cheaters, and Men Who Won't Commit -- And Find A Real Relationship, which was published in 2013.

She is also the author of two books on relationships published by Three Rivers Press of New York City. Her first book, published in 2001, is The Boyfriend Test: How to Evaluate His Potential Before You Lose Your Heart. This was followed in 2003 by The Girlfriend Test: A Quiz for Women Who Want to Be a Better Date and a Better Mate.

Walsh is a regular contributor to Momlogic.com, where she has written over 200 posts on contemporary parenting issues. Walsh also contributes a regular column to Pregnancy magazine.

== Filmography ==
Year	Title	Role	Notes
1992	Animal Instincts	Interviewer	
1994	The Mask	Herself	
1995	Live Shot		Television series 1 episode
1995	Heat	News anchorwoman	
1996	The Cable Guy	Reporter outside courtroom	
1996	Fly Away Home	TV anchor	
1997	Leave It to Beaver	Woman TV reporter	
1997	Baywatch	Sarah DeWindt	Episode: "Missing"
2004	The Day After Tomorrow	Weather Channel newscaster #1	
2007	Crossing Jordan	News reporter	Television series 1 episode
2008	Superhero Movie	Live reporter	
2011	The Doctors	Co-host	Television series; Season 4
