= Travis Stork =

American physician

Travis Lane Stork
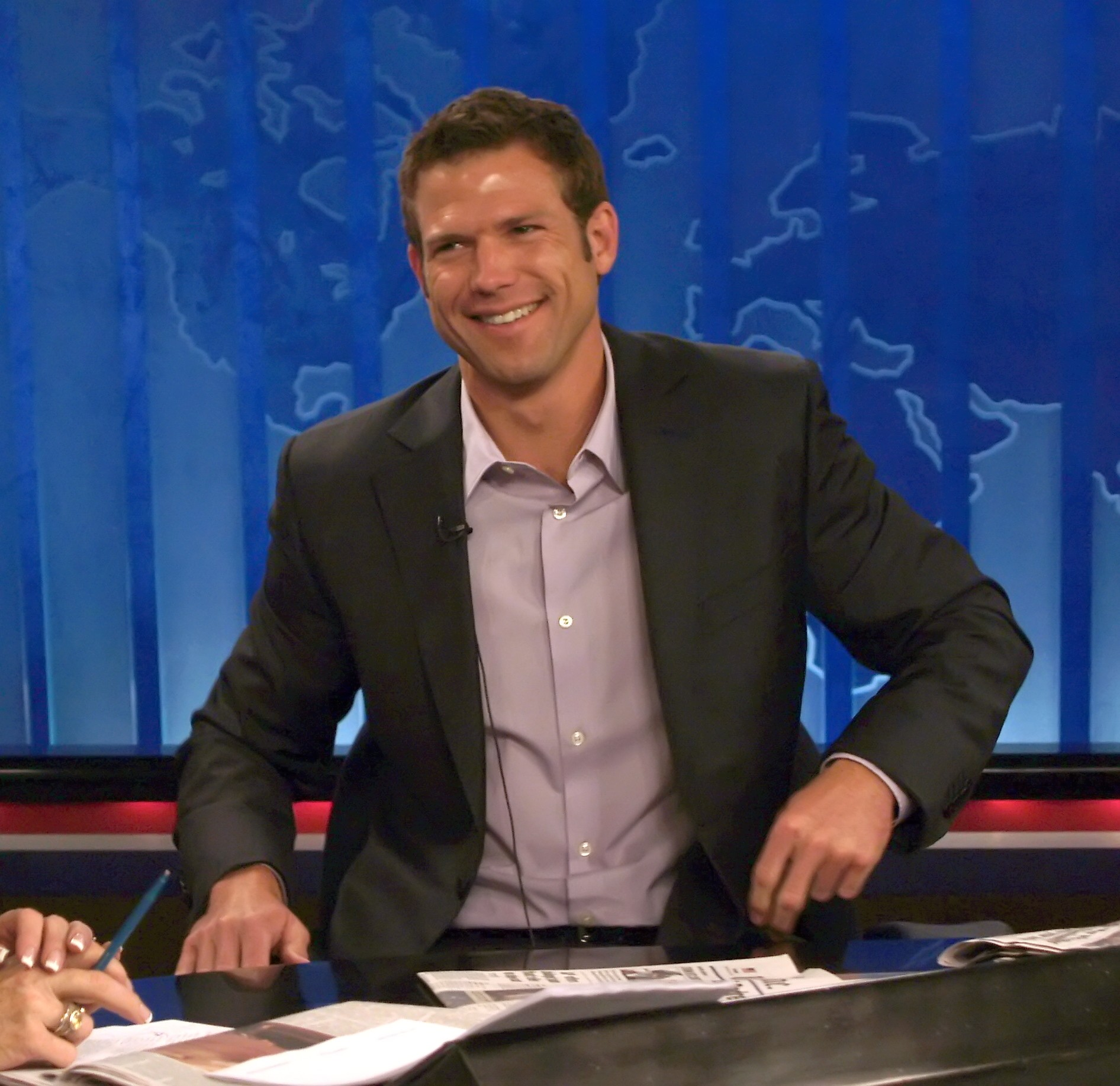
- Stork in San Diego in 2008
- Born: March 9, 1972 (age 54); St. Louis, Missouri, U.S.
- Education: Duke University (B.S.); University of Virginia (M.D.)
- Occupations: Television personality, emergency physician, author
- Height: 6 ft 3 in (1.91 m)
- Spouses: Charlotte Brown (m. 2012; div. 2015) Parris Bell (m. 2019)
- Children: 2

Travis Lane Stork (born March 9, 1972) is an American television personality, emergency physician, and author best known for appearing on The Bachelor, and as the host of the syndicated daytime talk show The Doctors from 2008 to 2020.

== Career ==
Stork graduated magna cum laude as a member of Phi Beta Kappa Society from Duke University, and earned his medical degree with honors from the University of Virginia, where he was a member of Alpha Omega Alpha. He thereafter began an emergency medicine residency at Vanderbilt University Medical Center in Nashville, Tennessee.

During his residency, Stork appeared on Season 8 of The Bachelor. During the season finale of the show, Stork chose schoolteacher Sarah Stone, who, coincidentally, lived only a few blocks away from his Nashville residence. However, only one week after the show's pre-taped finale aired, the couple announced their relationship was already over. He completed his residency, then practiced medicine in the emergency departments at Vanderbilt and a hospital in Colorado.

In October 2013, Stork joined telehealth company MDLIVE as chairman of its Medical Advisory Board. As of March 2015, he was no longer affiliated with the company.

Stork has published several books for the general public about health, which includes The Lean Belly Prescription and The Doctor's Diet, and both had made the New York Times Best Seller list in the "Advice, How-to & Miscellaneous" category.

=== The Doctors ===
Stork was a host on The Doctors, a Los Angeles–based daytime medical/talk show, beginning with its debut in September 2008 and continuing until September 2020 when the show switched to a single-host format (the series would end in August 2022). On the show, Stork led a panel of three other physicians from different fields (pediatrics, plastic surgery and obstetrics/gynecology) who discussed health issues and answered audience questions. The idea came from a series of segments that were featured on Dr. Phil, to which Stork was also a frequent contributor.

The show won the Daytime Emmy Award for Outstanding Talk Show Informative in 2010.

A 2014 study in the British Medical Journal determined that "evidence supported 63%, contradicted 14%, and was not found for 24%" of recommendations made by the panel of doctors, and that "the public should be skeptical about recommendations made on medical talk shows."

== Personal life ==
Stork grew up in Missouri and attended Parkway West High School in Ballwin, Missouri. His parents were Midwestern farmers and he is the first doctor in his family. He was married to pediatrician Charlotte Brown from 2012 to 2015. He later married Parris Bell on August 3, 2019. On June 17, 2020 their first child, a son, was born.

Preceded by Charlie O'Connell	The Bachelor; Season 8	Succeeded by Prince Lorenzo Borghese
