= The Doctors (talk show) =

American syndicated talk show (2008–2022)

- Created by: Phil McGraw
- Starring: Travis Lane Stork; Andrew P. Ordon; Nita Landry; Jim Sears; Lisa Masterson; Sonia Batra; Judy Ho; Rachael Ross; Jennifer Berman; Jennifer Ashton; Ian K. Smith; Azadeh Shirazi
- Theme music composer: Moon Martin
- Opening theme: Adaptation of "Bad Case of Loving You (Doctor, Doctor)"
- Country of origin: United States
- Original language: English
- No. of seasons: 14
- No. of episodes: 1,900+

Production
- Executive producers: Jay McGraw; Carla Pennington; Patricia Ciano; Phil McGraw; Andrew Scher
- Producers: Veronica Torres; Lisa Williams; Michelle Wendt; Joyce Coleman-Sampson; Jay McGraw; Carla Pennington; Dr. Phil McGraw; Andrew Scher; Jeff Hudson; George Davilas; Rich de Michele; Kathy Gulinello; Sarah Rogers; Shannon Hunt; Veronica Torres; Lisa Williams; Joni Busby; Nicole Petreshock; Michelle Wendt; Lauree Dash; Paul Lutz; Jennifer Sherry; Stephanie Berk; Josie Viviano; Jeannine Denholm; Daniel Primer; Stacy Tobin; John Pattyson; Michael Weaver; Andrea Masimitsu
- Camera setup: Multiple
- Running time: 42 minutes
- Production companies: Stage 29 Productions; CBS Television Distribution (2008–2021) (seasons 1-13); CBS Media Ventures (2021–2022) (seasons 13-14)

Original release
- Network: Syndication
- Release: September 8, 2008 – August 8, 2022

Related
- Dr. Phil

The Doctors was a daily American syndicated talk show featuring medical advice, which originally aired from September 8, 2008, to August 8, 2022. The hour-long daytime program was produced by Phil McGraw and his son Jay McGraw and is distributed domestically and globally by CBS Media Ventures. The series is a spin-off of Dr. Phil and is the first talk show to be a third generation talk show spin-off, as Dr. Phil itself spun off The Oprah Winfrey Show.

== Details ==
The concept, which originated on Dr. Phil, mostly focuses on health and medical issues, as a team of medical professionals (and sometimes celebrity guests/speakers) discuss a range of various health-related topics and answer questions from viewers who are too embarrassed to ask their doctors.

The series was hosted by emergency room physician and former The Bachelor participant Travis Stork who has appeared frequently on Dr. Phil, with pediatrician Jim Sears, obstetrician/gynecologist Lisa Masterson, and plastic surgeon Andrew Ordon rounding out the discussion panel.

On May 6, 2011, it was announced that Jillian Michaels had been added to the cast of The Doctors doing mainly segments outside the studio, along with serving as a "special correspondent" on Dr. Phil. Wendy Walsh, a psychotherapist and relationship expert seen usually in pundit panels on CNN and HLN, was announced as a fifth regular panelist to the show on September 1, 2011, to start as of September 12, 2011. In 2013, OB-GYN Jennifer Ashton joined the show as a recurring co-host, a role she filled until 2016.

During the holiday break at the end of 2011, Michaels left the show to return to The Biggest Loser, with Walsh also departing the series and returning it to the original four-doctor format for the 2012 season. Lisa Masterson did not return for the sixth season. Urologist Jennifer Berman and family medicine physician and sexologist Rachael Ross, who has joined comparisons to sex therapist Dr. Ruth Westheimer, joined the series.

Beginning in 2017, Sako Karakozian, a dentist practicing in Studio City, Los Angeles, has made appearances on the show offering dental advice. OB-GYN Nita Landry joined the show in 2017 as a recurring co-host.

On August 12, 2020, it was announced that the series would undergo several major changes for season 13, including production moving to Stamford, Connecticut, and a revamped format with a new singular host Ian K. Smith, and a theme of "[taking] your power back" amid uncertain times. Smith was later replaced by Ordon.

In the spring of 2022, the show was canceled after 14 seasons.

Two years after the show's cancellation in the fall of 2024 The Doctors debuted its own free live TV channel on Plex featuring past episodes from all 14 seasons and on demand streaming on The Roku Channel.

== Reception ==
=== Ratings ===
The show had not ranked in the top 20 syndicated programs at all during the beginning of its first season, coming in behind the syndicated version of the game show Deal or No Deal among new syndicated programs, garnering a 1.3 rating at the time of its launch. In 2009, it had a 1.5 rating by the end of October, up to 1.9 by December, and 2.3 by January, surpassing Deal or No Deal; the show remained the top new talk show of the season.

In Buffalo, New York, the show was credited in 2008 with increasing the lead-in for WKBW-TV's 5:00 newscasts, to the point that the station was competitive with other stations in the market.

=== Quality of advice ===
A 2014 study in the British Medical Journal examined 40 randomly-selected episodes of The Doctors and studied the veracity of 80 randomly-selected statements or recommendations made in each episode. The study determined that "evidence supported 63%, contradicted 14%, and was not found for 24%" of recommendations made by the panel of doctors, and advised that "the public should be skeptical about recommendations made on medical talk shows". However, the limitations of that study included "the inherent complexity of the shows, including the subjective nature of the recommendations such as distinguishing between what was said and what was implied".

== Non-American versions ==
In the Canadian province of Quebec, a French language version called Les Docteurs aired on Radio-Canada (simultaneously with The Doctors, which airs on a different channel at that time) from 2011 to 2013, with doctors Alain Vadeboncoeur, Chantal Guimont, Gaëlle Vekemans and Jacques Toueg. The show, whose format was identical to the previous seasons of the English version, features French-Canadian doctors in a similar-looking set with the same color scheme and French wording, though it did not license the theme song and goes without sound effects.

In Argentina and Mexico, a Latin American version called Los Doctores is airs on Televisa and Telefe. In Malaysia, a Malay version of The Doctors called MY Doctors airs on Astro Ria. In Vietnam, the program is called Các Bác sĩ nói gì? (What do the Doctors say?). In Portugal, the show airs in English with Portuguese subtitles on SIC.
