= Rachael Ray (talk show) =

American syndicated talk show (2006–2023)

- Genre: Talk show
- Presented by: Rachael Ray
- Country of origin: United States
- Original language: English
- No. of seasons: 17
- No. of episodes: 2,941

Production
- Executive producers: Janet Annino; Rachael Ray
- Production locations: Chelsea Studios, New York City
- Camera setup: Multi-camera
- Running time: 42 minutes
- Production companies: Harpo Productions (2006–10); Harpo Studios (2010–23); Scripps Networks (2006–18); Discovery Productions (2018–22); Warner Bros. Discovery (2022–23); Watch Entertainment

Original release
- Network: Syndication
- Release: September 18, 2006 – July 28, 2023

Rachael Ray (also known as The Rachael Ray Show and Rachael) is an American television talk show hosted by Rachael Ray that aired in syndication from September 18, 2006 to July 28, 2023. It was taped at Chelsea Television Studios in New York City and her home.

== Format ==
The concept behind this program showcases Ray's culinary skills. She brings various celebrities on screen to discuss their accomplishments in the entertainment, sports, and media industries. Ray asks for tips and strategies for staying healthy and safe from various health and lifestyle experts, she includes make-over segments, and features musical performances, all of which are features along the same lines of The Oprah Winfrey Show. She does, however, keep cooking in the forefront by including at least one cooking segment at the end of each episode, and sometimes inviting her celebrity guests to join her in the kitchen. According to Ray, "People know me for my love of food, but I have so much more I want to share." The set has the audience seated on a large turntable that rotates so that the audience can always see the "action" on the circular stage that surrounds them. At the end of each show, with the exception of a few more guests after Ray's cooking segments, Ray's tagline is, "We'll see you when we see you."

On March 9, 2007, Entertainment Tonight revealed that the show's theme music was written and recorded by Ray's husband, John Cusimano. The original theme song to the show was performed by R&B, Soul and Jazz group The Neville Brothers. Their song had the same rhythm and melody as their classic hit "Yellow Moon", but with different lyrics. Aaron Neville sang the song. Starting with the fifth season, the original theme was retired. With the start of the seventh season, the show relocated to Chelsea Studios in the Chelsea section of New York, the same facility where The Wendy Williams Show and Sherri tape in a second studio.

== Ratings ==
Rachael Ray with John McCain in the kitchen on her show.

During its first season, the show averaged about 2.6 million views daily, making it one of the highest viewed daytime shows. Not long after it debuted, it was revealed that Rachael Ray was renewed through 2010, adding two years to the already two years it had received. In June 2009, Rachael Ray was renewed for two more years, till 2012, making 6 seasons. Rachael Ray was the only one of the four syndicated daytime talk shows that premiered for the 2006–07 season to be renewed. By the show's third season in 2008, ratings had dropped to a 1.8. However, ratings leveled off in 2010 with 1.5 and roughly 2 million viewers for the fifth season. At the start of its sixth season in 2011, the show's ratings rose to 1.7.

== Awards ==
Year	Award	Category	Honorees	Result
2007	Daytime Emmy Award	Outstanding Talk Show	Rachael Ray	Nominated
2007	Daytime Emmy Award	Outstanding Talk Show Host	Rachael Ray	Nominated
2008	Daytime Emmy Award	Outstanding Talk Show Entertainment	Rachael Ray	Won
2009	Daytime Emmy Award	Outstanding Talk Show Entertainment	Rachael Ray	Won
2009	Daytime Emmy Award	Outstanding Entertainment Talk Show Host	Rachael Ray	Nominated
2010	Daytime Emmy Award	Outstanding Entertainment Talk Show Host	Rachael Ray	Nominated
2010	Daytime Emmy Award	Outstanding Talk Show Entertainment	Rachael Ray	Nominated
2010	Daytime Emmy Award	Outstanding Directing In A Lifestyle/Culinary Program	Gene Bernard	Nominated
2011	Daytime Emmy Award	Outstanding Talk Show Entertainment	Rachael Ray	Nominated
2011	Daytime Emmy Award	Outstanding Entertainment Talk Show Host	Rachael Ray	Nominated
2012	Daytime Emmy Award	Outstanding Entertainment Talk Show Host	Rachael Ray	Nominated
2013	Daytime Emmy Award	Outstanding Entertainment Talk Show Host	Rachael Ray	Nominated
2014	Daytime Emmy Award	Outstanding Talk Show Entertainment	Rachael Ray	Nominated
2014	Daytime Emmy Award	Outstanding Entertainment Talk Show Host	Rachael Ray	Nominated
2014	Daytime Emmy Award	Directing In A Talk Show/Morning Program	Rachael Ray	Nominated
2014	Daytime Emmy Award	Achievement In Live And Direct To Tape Sound Mixing	Rachael Ray	Nominated
2014	Daytime Emmy Award	Achievement In Hairstyling	Rachael Ray	Nominated
2015	Creative Arts Emmy Award	Best Lighting Direction	Rachael Ray	Nominated
2016	Creative Arts Emmy Award	Best Lighting Direction	Rachael Ray	Nominated
2016	Creative Arts Emmy Award	Best Multiple Camera Editing	Rachael Ray	Won
2017	Daytime Emmy Award	Best Musical Performance In A Daytime Program	Pentatonix on Rachael Ray	Nominated
2019	Daytime Emmy Award	Outstanding Talk Show Informative	Rachael Ray	Won
2019	Daytime Emmy Award	Outstanding Informative Talk Show Host	Rachael Ray	Nominated
