= America's Next Top Model season 3 =

America's Next Top Model
- Season 3
- Judges: Tyra Banks; Janice Dickinson; Nigel Barker; Nolé Marin
- No. of contestants: 14
- Winner: Eva Pigford
- No. of episodes: 13

Release
- Original network: UPN
- Original release: September 22 – December 15, 2004

Additional information
- Filming dates: May 10 – July 14, 2004

Season chronology
- ← Previous; Season 2 Next → Season 4

The third cycle of America's Next Top Model debuted on September 22, 2004, and was hosted by model Tyra Banks. It was the first cycle to gain partnership with cosmetics magnate CoverGirl and ran weekly commercials during the show named Beauty Tip of the Week with Jay Manuel and Elsa Benítez as well as the CoverGirl of the Week contest. The cast was increased to 14 contestants, and the season's catchphrase was, "Beauty In Progress."

The prizes for this cycle were:

- A modeling contract with Ford Models.
- A fashion spread and cover in Elle Magazine.
- A US$100,000 contract with CoverGirl cosmetics.

The following prizes had been removed:

- A modeling contract with IMG Models.
- A fashion spread and cover in Jane Magazine.
- A cosmetics campaign with Sephora.

The international destinations during this cycle were Montego Bay, Jamaica (for one episode), and Tokyo, Japan, the show's first visit to Asia.

The winner was 19-year-old Eva Pigford from Los Angeles, California, then YaYa DaCosta been the runner-up.

== Contestants ==
(Ages stated are at the time of filming)

Contestant	Age	Height	Hometown	Outcome	Place
Magdalena Rivas	24	5 ft 9 in (1.75 m)	Worcester, Massachusetts	Episode 2	14
Leah Darrow	24	5 ft 9 in (1.75 m)	Norman, Oklahoma	Episode 2	13
Julie Titus	20	5 ft 9 in (1.75 m)	Kent, Washington	Episode 3	12
Kristi Grommet	20	5 ft 10 in (1.78 m)	St. Louis, Missouri	Episode 4	11
Jennipher Frost	22	5 ft 10 in (1.78 m)	Pocatello, Idaho	Episode 5	10
Kelle Jacob	19	5 ft 11 in (1.80 m)	Seagate, New York	Episode 6	9
Cassie Grisham	19	5 ft 10 in (1.78 m)	Norman, Oklahoma	Episode 7	8
Toccara Jones	23	5 ft 9 in (1.75 m)	Dayton, Ohio	Episode 8	7
Nicole Borud	21	5 ft 8 in (1.73 m)	Minot, North Dakota	Episode 9	6
Norelle Van Herk	20	5 ft 10.5 in (1.79 m)	Newport Beach, California	Episode 11	5
Ann Markley	21	5 ft 11 in (1.80 m)	Erie, Pennsylvania	Episode 12	4
Amanda Swafford	25	5 ft 8 in (1.73 m)	Hendersonville, North Carolina	Episode 13	3
Yaya DaCosta	21	5 ft 8 in (1.73 m)	Harlem, New York	Episode 13	2
Eva Pigford	19	5 ft 7 in (1.70 m)	Westmont, California	Episode 13	1

== Episodes ==
No. overall	No. in season	Title	Original release date	US viewers (millions)
21	1	"The Girl with the Secret"	September 22, 2004	3.62
The series began with thirty-four contestants' interviews with Tyra Banks, J. Alexander, and Jay Manuel. The first episode also introduces both Tiffany Richardson and Mary Nnenna Nwokoma, who both reauditioned the next Cycle and concludes with the selection of the top fourteen contestants.
22	2	"The Girl Who Is Codependent"	September 29, 2004	4.36
The top fourteen contestants were flown to Montego Bay for their first photo shoot, in which they modeled bikinis on a coral reef. Magdalena became the first contestant eliminated from the competition the day after the photo shoot, and the judging session saw Yaya, Kristi, and Toccara gave the best photos while Leah become the second contestant eliminated.: Featured photographer: Nick Cardallicio; Special guests: J. Alexander, Michelle Mock, Douglas Barcellos, Mathu Anderson, and Danilo; CoverGirl of the Week: Yaya DaCosta
23	3	"The Girl Everyone Thinks Is a Backstabber"	October 6, 2004	5.06
The top twelve contestants received makeovers. The week's challenge was in makeup and was won by Norelle. For the week's photoshoot, the contestants shot a campaign for Nivea. The judging session saw Amanda, Nicole, Yaya, Eva, and Toccara give the best photos while Julie becomes the third contestant eliminated from the competition.: Featured photographer: Troy Ward; Special guests: Kiara Kabukuru, Anthony Palermo, Leonard Zagami, Debra Jaliman M.D., Dr. Zarabi, and Danilo; CoverGirl of the Week: Yaya DaCosta
24	4	"The Girl Who Sets a Trap"	October 13, 2004	4.80
For the week's challenge, the top eleven contestants walked in a fashion show for Heatherette, with Eva being chosen as the challenge winner. The photoshoot was a campaign for Lee Jeans, in which the contestants shot together in one group. The judging session saw Ann, Nicole, Norelle, and Toccara gave the best photos while Kristi becomes the fourth contestant eliminated from the competition.: Featured photographer: Hyungwan Roo; Special guests: J. Alexander, Yoanna House, Danilo, Richie Rich, and Heatherette; CoverGirl of the Week: Yaya DaCosta
25	5	"The Girl Who Cries When She Looks in the Mirror"	October 20, 2004	5.07
For the week's challenge, the ten remaining contestants posed as mannequins in a La Perla store window. The challenge winner was Kelle. The photoshoot was a campaign for Dooney & Bourke purses. The judging session saw Amanda, Yaya, and Nicole gave the best photos while Jennipher becomes the fifth contestants eliminated from the competition.: Featured photographer: Matthew Jordan Smith; Special guests: Simon Doonan, Savvas, and Lanny Ward; CoverGirl of the Week: Toccara Jones
26	6	"The Girl Who Mutilated the Precious Brownies"	October 27, 2004	5.05
For the week's challenge, the nine remaining contestants climbed fourteen flights of stairs, doing a photo shoot at the top. The challenge winner was Yaya. At the house, Ann and Eva get annoyed at Cassie for leaving her brownies and leftover ingredients on the kitchen counter and Ann decides to write 'Clean Your Sh*t" in her brownies as a practical joke. Cassie gets upset at this and after some investigating, concludes that Ann was the one who wrote in the brownies. Excitement builds up in the house for the imminent confrontation and Yaya decides to wear a t-shirt with the word 'Respeito' on it, a Portuguese word meaning respect, which Yaya feels is lacking in the house. The contestants go out for dinner and Cassie and Yaya confront Ann about the incident. Ann and Eva defend themselves by arguing that it was a simply a joke and that Cassie should clean up their dishes and Ann eventually bringing up Cassie's alleged bulimia, angering Cassie further. The photoshoot was a campaign for YJ Stinger energy drinks, which required the girls to jump on a trampoline. The judging session saw Nicole, Amanda, and Eva gave the best photos while Kelle becomes the sixth contestant eliminated from the competition.: Featured photographer: Sascha Pflaeging and Che Graham; Special guests: Joy Bauer, Captain Leif Wade, and Kate Dillon Levin; CoverGirl of the Week: Toccara Jones
27	7	"The Girl Who Forgot Her Shoes"	November 3, 2004	5.67
For the week's challenge, the eight remaining contestants attended go-sees. The challenge winner was Yaya. For the photoshoot, the models portrayed alter egos. The stylist failed to provide adequate clothing options for Toccara, whom she taunted and mistreated as a plus size contestant. This encounter negatively affected Toccara's performance in the challenge. The judging session saw Eva, Ann, and Norelle gave the best photos while Cassie becomes the seventh contestant eliminated from the competition.: Featured photographer: Davide; Special guests: Nicole Miller, Cynthia Rowley, Diane von Fürstenberg, Nanette Lepore, J. Alexander, and Marc Bouwer; CoverGirl of the Week: Toccara Jones
28	8	"The Girl Who Is Panic-Stricken"	November 10, 2004	5.60
For the week's challenge, the seven remaining contestants gave interviews on a red carpet. The challenge winner was Yaya. For the photoshoot, the contestants had beauty shots taken wearing Verragio diamonds and posing with a live tarantula. The judging session saw Yaya and Eva gave the best photos while Toccara becomes the eighth contestant eliminated from the competition.: Featured photographer: Bill Diodato; Special guests: Paul Wilmot, Hampton Carney, Sarah Pyper, and Rebecca Weinberg; CoverGirl of the Week: Toccara Jones
29	9	"The Girl Meets Taye Diggs"	November 17, 2004	5.11
The six remaining contestants had an acting challenge with Taye Diggs. The challenge winner was Yaya. The girls were then told by Tyra that they were to be flown to Tokyo, and as the challenge winner, Yaya could fly first class, and chose Amanda to fly first class with her. The contestants arrived in Japan and found out they were staying in a capsule hotel. The next day, they shot a Campbell's soup commercial. Not only were they required to speak Japanese, but they were told that their director, Zente Yoshie, didn’t speak any English. Ann excelled, with the Zente Yoshie‘s translator commenting that her Japanese was “perfect”, whereas Nicole and Eva struggled to speak Japanese. Backstage, Eva told Ann that she hopes Norelle “eats it” during her commercial, which angered Ann, as Norelle was Ann’s friend. During the judging session, the girls were set a test in which they had to read a commercial and eat umeboshi, where Yaya was criticized for spitting out the umeboshi. At judging, the judges forgot to call Nicole forward for her evaluation, prompting the judges to question if she was memorable enough. Ann won the best commercial of the week, while Nicole becomes the ninth contestant eliminated from the competition.: Featured commercial director: Zente Yoshie; Special guests: Taye Diggs, Sande Shurin, and Toko Niwa; CoverGirl of the Week: Eva Pigford
30	10	"The Girl Who Goes Ballistic"	November 24, 2004	4.54
This episode was an overview of the past nine episodes of the cycle which featured previously unseen footage.: CoverGirl of the Week: Eva Pigford
31	11	"The Girl the Lionesses are Hunting"	December 1, 2004	4.90
For the week's challenge, the five remaining contestants learned and then were tested on their knowledge about the Tea Ceremony. The challenge winner was Yaya. The photoshoot was a campaign for T-Mobile; the contestants posed in kimono. The judging session saw Eva and Amanda gave the best photos, while Ann breaks the record by surviving the bottom two for the fourth time over Norelle who becomes the tenth contestant eliminated from the competition in her only ever bottom two appearance.: Featured photographer: Amiko; Special guests: Toko Niwa, Kuineo Koike, Yoko Takahashi, and Kyoko Higa; CoverGirl of the Week: Eva Pigford
32	12	"The Girl Who Didn't Hug Goodbye"	December 8, 2004	5.20
For the week's challenge, the four remaining contestants attended go-sees. The challenge winner was Eva. For the photoshoot, the contestants modeled an anime-inspired look on a motorcycle. At the judging session, the girls were required to incorporate Japanese Street Fashion: Lolita fashion into their personal style. Yaya was criticized for arriving late and told to leave the pressroom. Amanda gave the best photo, while Eva survives her first ever bottom two appearance over Ann who becomes the eleventh contestant eliminated from the competition after breaking yet another record of having five collective bottom two appearances during the same cycle.: Featured photographer: Takashi Miesaki; Special guests: J. Alexander, Toyohiko Mikimoto, Sawa Vaughters, and Carolyn London; CoverGirl of the Week: Eva Pigford
33	13	"The Girl Who Wins it All"	December 15, 2004	6.47
The top three contestants, Amanda Swafford, Eva Pigford, and Yaya DaCosta shot an ad campaign for CoverGirl. Amanda was the twelfth contestant eliminated from the competition at the penultimate judging session.: Featured photographer: Shu Scenzu; Eva and Yaya partook in a Noriko Fukushima fashion show. The final judging session saw Eva crowned America's Next Top Model.: Special guests: J. Alexander and Noriko Fukushima; CoverGirl of the Week: Eva Pigford

== Summaries ==
=== Call-out order ===
Order	Episodes												
Order	1 (Note: In episode 1, the group of 34 semi-finalists was reduced to 14. This call-out order does not reflect their performances that week.)	2 (Note: In episode 2, Magdalena was eliminated after the photo shoot.)	3	4	5	6	7	8	9	11	12	13	
1	Ann	Yaya	Amanda	Cassie	Amanda	Eva	Eva	Nicole	Ann	Amanda	Amanda	Yaya	Eva
2	Leah	Kristi	Nicole	Ann	Yaya	Amanda	Ann	Eva	Eva	Yaya	Yaya	Eva	Yaya
3	Kelle	Julie	Eva	Nicole	Norelle	Nicole	Yaya	Amanda	Norelle	Eva	Eva	Amanda	
4	Cassie	Jennipher	Yaya	Toccara	Eva	Yaya	Norelle	Yaya	Amanda	Ann	Ann		
5	Yaya	Kelle	Toccara	Eva	Nicole	Toccara	Amanda	Norelle	Yaya	Norelle			
6	Kristi	Cassie	Jennipher	Amanda	Toccara	Norelle	Nicole	Ann	Nicole				
7	Julie	Toccara	Cassie	Norelle	Ann	Cassie	Toccara	Toccara					
8	Magdalena	Nicole	Norelle	Yaya	Cassie	Ann	Cassie						
9	Nicole	Eva	Ann	Kelle	Kelle	Kelle							
10	Amanda	Norelle	Kristi	Jennipher	Jennipher	Jennipher	Jennipher	Jennipher	Jennipher	Jennipher	Jennipher	Jennipher	Jennipher
11	Norelle	Amanda	Kelle	Kristi									
12	Toccara	Ann	Julie										
13	Jennipher	Leah											
14	Eva	Magdalena											

The contestant was eliminated
The contestant was eliminated outside of the judging panel
The contestant won the competition

=== Average call-out order ===
Casting call-out order and final two are not included.

Rank by average	Place	Model	Call-out total	Number of call-outs	Call-out average
1	1	Eva	35	11	3.18
2	2	Yaya	36	11	3.27
3	3	Amanda	38	11	3.45
4	6	Nicole	34	8	4.25
5	4	Ann	55	10	5.50
6	5	Norelle	51	9	5.67
7	7	Toccara	41	7	5.86
8	8	Cassie	37	6	6.17
9–10	10	Jennipher	30	4	7.50
9–10	12	Julie	15	2	7.50
11	11	Kristi	23	3	7.67
12	9	Kelle	43	5	8.60
13	13	Leah	13	1	13.00
14	14	Magdalena	14	1	14.00

=== Bottom two ===
Episode	Contestants			Eliminated
2	Ann	&	Leah	Magdalena
2	Ann	&	Leah	Leah
3	Julie	&	Kelle	Julie
4	Jennipher	&	Kristi	Kristi
5	Jennipher	&	Kelle	Jennipher
6	Ann	&	Kelle	Kelle
7	Cassie	&	Toccara	Cassie
8	Ann	&	Toccara	Toccara
9	Nicole	&	Yaya	Nicole
11	Ann	&	Norelle	Norelle
12	Ann	&	Eva	Ann
13	Amanda	&	Eva	Amanda
13	Eva	&	Yaya	Yaya

The contestant was eliminated after her first time in the bottom two
The contestant was eliminated after her second time in the bottom two
The contestant was eliminated after her third time in the bottom two
The contestant was eliminated after her fifth time in the bottom two
The contestant was eliminated outside of the judging panel
The contestant was eliminated in the final judging and placed as the runner-up

=== Photo shoot guide ===
- Episode 2 photo shoot: Swimsuits on the beaches of Jamaica
- Episode 3 photo shoot: Nivea beauty shots
- Episode 4 photo shoot: Lee Jeans topless group shot
- Episode 5 photo shoot: Dooney & Bourke purses on roller skates
- Episode 6 photo shoot: YJ Stinger energy drink on a trampoline
- Episode 7 photo shoot: Alter-egos with Ford Mustang
- Episode 8 photo shoot: Verragio diamonds beauty shot with a tarantula
- Episode 9 commercial: Japanese Campbell's Soup commercial
- Episode 11 photo shoot: Geishas in kimonos for T-Mobile phone
- Episode 12 photo shoot: Harajuku-inspired motorcyclists
- Episode 13 photo shoot: CoverGirl Wet Slicks Crystals print ad

=== Other cast members ===
- Jay Manuel – Photo Director
- J. Alexander – Runway Coach
- Mathu Anderson – Make-Up Artist
- Danilo – Hairstylist

=== Makeovers ===
- Julie - Trimmed and layered
- Kristi - Long chic bangs
- Jennipher - Cut to shoulder length and dyed honey blonde with matching eyebrows
- Kelle - Long wavy black extensions
- Cassie - Long curly blonde weave
- Toccara - Shoulder length wavy brown extensions
- Nicole - Lucille Ball inspired cut and dyed red with matching eyebrows
- Norelle - Shaggy bob cut and braces removed
- Ann - Cut shorter with platinum blonde highlights
- Amanda - Long ice blonde weave; later, weave removed
- Yaya - Braids removed and acne treatment
- Eva - Cut shorter and dyed golden blonde

== Post-Top Model careers ==
- Magdalena Rivas does not appear to have modeled since the show ended.
- Leah Darrow modeled some in New York but quit to become a Catholic author and speaker.
- Julie Titus does not appear to have modeled since the show ended.
- Kristi Grommet does not appear to have modeled since the show ended.
- Jennipher Frost worked as a marketing manager for a restaurant in Las Vegas and married former football player Brian Urlacher in 2016.
- Kelle Jacobs had a spread in Source Magazine and worked in a corporate role at Estee Lauder.
- Cassie Grisham received a degree in international communications from the University of Oklahoma and worked for DePuy.
- Toccara Jones was signed by Wilhelmina Models and has modeled for brands including Ashley Stewart, Avon, Torrid, New York and Company, and Target. She has appeared in Essence, Vibe Magazine, and Smooth Magazine, and had a spread in Vogue Italia. She has appeared on 106 & Park, Celebrity Fit Club, Celebrity Paranormal Project, and The Tyra Banks Show. Jones also runs a lingerie company.
- Nicole Borud moved to San Clemente, California to pursue acting.
- Norelle Van Herk was signed by Nous Model Management and Dream Models in Hong Kong.
- Ann Markley, who now goes by Annalaina Marks professionally, was signed by Wilhelmina Models in Chicago and has done some modeling since the show for brands including Lord and Taylor, Old Navy, and Jay Manuel beauty.
- Amanda Swafford has had some modeling work since the show, including appearing in a campaign for Levi's Jeans.
- YaYa DaCosta did some modeling work after the show, appearing in ads for companies such as Lincoln Townhouse, RadioShack, Sephora, Oil of Olay, Dr. Scholl's, and Garnier Fructis. She is best known as an actress, having appeared in television shows such as All My Children, Ugly Betty, and Chicago Med. DaCosta has appeared in a number of films, such as I Will Always Love You, Take the Lead, The Kids are Alright, Big Words, Honeydripper, Lee Daniels' The Butler, In Time, and Tron: Legacy.
- Eva Pigford, who now goes by Eva Marcille professionally, won a contract with CoverGirl, representation by Ford Models, and a spread in Elle. She has since appeared on the covers of Brides Noir, Women's Health and Fitness, Essence, IONA, and KING Magazine. She has also appeared in campaigns for Samsung, Apple Bottom Jeans, DKNY, and Red by Marc Ecko. Marcille also pursued an acting career, appearing in The Young and the Restless, House of Payne, and Let's Stay Together. She hosted the reality show My Model Looks Better Than Your Model. Marcille was on three seasons of Real Housewives of Atlanta from 2017 to 2020.
