= Naima Mora =

American fashion model

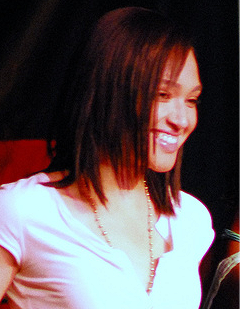
- Mora in 2011
- Born: March 1, 1984 (age 42); Detroit, Michigan, U.S.
- Modeling information
- Height: 5 ft 9.5 in (177 cm)
- Hair color: Brown
- Eye color: Brown
- Agency: State Management Agency

Naima Mora (born March 1, 1984) is an American fashion model and the winner of Cycle 4 of America's Next Top Model.

== Biography ==
=== Early life ===
Mora was born in Detroit, Michigan, the daughter of jazz vocalist and entrepreneur Theresa Mora and jazz percussionist Francisco Mora Catlett. Her paternal grandparents were Mexican muralist Francisco Mora and sculptor, painter, and printmaker Elizabeth Catlett. She is the inspiration for her grandmother's 2001 black marble bust entitled Naima. Catlett described it as:

That black marble head, Naima: we have twin granddaughters who came to stay with us one summer, they were studying Spanish. I kept looking at one of them, who has a very dynamic personality. I thought I would like to do a head of her. And then it was the shape of her hair with a knot at the back. It was a whole different shape. She posed for me a little bit, to get the general shape of it. She has a little bump in her nose that I wanted to put in.

Her father is half Mexican and half African-American; her mother is Irish and African-American. She was named after the John Coltrane song "Naima". Mora has five sisters, including her identical twin, Nia, who is a photographer. Her older sister, Ife Sanchez Mora (born 1977), is a singer/ songwriter and was signed to Tricky's Massive Attack label Durban Poison/ DreamWorks S.K.G in the trip-hop group, The Autumn People and is now a solo rock singer Ife Sanchez Mora and part of duet Ife & Danny and was the wife of chef Aaron Sanchez.

Mora grew up near West McNichols and Schaefer on Detroit's northwest side and attended Bates Academy for middle school. She graduated from Cass Technical High School in Detroit in 2002. A serious ballet student, Mora attended Detroit's Ballet Renaissance and was enrolled in American Ballet Theatre's Detroit summer program.

Mora practices Nichiren Buddhism and is an active member of the Soka Gakkai International. In 2013, she gave a TEDx Talk describing her upbringing and the influence of Buddhism on her career.

== America's Next Top Model ==
=== Winning America's Next Top Model Cycle 4 ===
Mora was the fifth contestant (after Rebecca Epley, Christina Murphy, Keenyah Hill and Brita Petersons) chosen for the top fourteen to compete on the UPN reality television show America's Next Top Model Cycle 4. Over her stay, she was voted Covergirl of the Week all ten times in a row, won four challenges which she shared with Tiffany Richardson, Kahlen Rondot, Lluvy Gomez, Christina Murphy, Michelle Deighton, Tatiana Dante, Keenyah Hill and Brittany Brower, and received two first call-outs both in Cape Town, South Africa. Mora had only one appearance in the bottom two where she survived over eventual Cycle 17: All Stars contestant, Brittany Brower. In the final judging, the judges selected Mora over the runner-up Kahlen Rondot.

=== America's Next Top Model Cycle 5 ===
After eventual Cycle 17: All Stars contestant, Bre Scullark, was eliminated, Mora appeared in the season finale of Cycle 5 alongside Cycle 3 Winner, Eva Pigford to participate in the final runway show with the finalists, Nik Pace and Nicole Linkletter.

=== America's Next Top Model Cycle 6 ===
Mora appeared as a guest in a Cycle 6 episode where the top twelve contestants completed their second challenge after watching the Gen Art Fashion Show. Nnenna Agba won this challenge and chose her fellow contestants Jade Cole and Gina Choe to participate in the prize.

== Career ==
On September 3, 2012, she released the iBook Naima Mora's Model Behavior, published by Possibility Publishing & Entertainment. She has been seen on television as a guest on The Tyra Banks Show, on the second-season premiere of Veronica Mars, and in a CoverGirl commercial with Yoanna House.

Mora and Cycle 3's Ann Markley were Trophy Girls at the 2005 Primetime Emmy Awards. Mora also served as a judge at the Miss Teen USA Pageant in 2005.

Mora has done print modeling for CoverGirl, ELLE Magazine, Fuego Magazine, Us Weekly Magazine, Radar, In Touch, Star, Teen People, Split Clothing, and elsewhere. Mora's runway shows include Christopher Deane Spring 2006 Collection, Gharani Strok Fall 2005, Carlos Miele Fashion Show, Walmart and ELLEgirl Presents Dare To Be You Spring 2006, Fashion Comedy Style 2005 (Charity Event), and New York Fashion Week 2007. She has modeled with her sisters twice: with her sister, Ife, for iTunes and with her twin, Nia, for Cycle 2's Camille McDonald's lingerie line, Lingerwear.

In 2006, she completed filming a role in the independent film Sarbanes-Oxley and made an appearance in a music video for TV on the Radio's "Wolf Like Me." The following year, she was on the cover of U&U magazine and Uzuri magazine and was photographed by Romer Pedrome and Derek Blanks. In 2008, she had a cover and editorial in Vicious magazine, and she signed with 301 Model Management in Miami and Basic Model Management in New York City. She got a showcard for Fashion Week SS09 and walked in the Project Runway Finale for designer Joe Farris. As of 2021, Mora continued modeling, and was signed with EMG Models.

Mora was the vocalist for the unsigned band Chewing Pics, and later with the band Galaxy of Tar.

With director Marishka S. Phillips, Mora wrote a play, The Amazing Adventures of a Woman in Need, about three characters who are each a part of Mora's own inner dialogue. In August 2021, MPTP Productions announced an Off-Broadway performance of the play, with Mora performing as the narrator, scheduled for October 2021.

== See also ==
- List of Afro-Latinos

Preceded by Eva Pigford	America's Next Top Model winner Cycle 4 (2005)	Succeeded by Nicole Linkletter
