= True Beauty season 1 =

True Beauty
- Season 1
- Judges: Vanessa Minnillo; Nolé Marin; Cheryl Tiegs
- No. of episodes: 8

Release
- Original network: ABC
- Original release: January 5 – February 23, 2009

Season chronology
- Next → Season 2

True Beauty (season 1) is the first season of the ABC reality television series True Beauty. The contestants are competing to see who is the most beautiful. However, they think they are only being tested on outer beauty. The show is hosted by three judges: Nolé Marin, Cheryl Tiegs, and Vanessa Minnillo who judge the contestants on their inner beauty. The contestants are competing for $100,000 and to be "featured in People magazine's 100 most beautiful people issue." The series, produced by Tyra Banks and Ashton Kutcher, premiered on ABC on January 5, 2009.

== Contestants ==
Name	Occupation	Hometown	Eliminated
Julia Anderson	Pageant Queen (Miss Grapevine)	Dallas, TX	Winner
Joel Rush	Software Salesman	Tampa, FL	Runner-up
Billy Jeffrey	Vitamin Store Owner & Chippendales Dancer	Lewiston, ID	Episode 8
Laura Leigh Siani	Swimsuit Model	Staten Island, NY	Episode 7
Ray Seitz	Artist	San Diego, CA	Episode 6
Chelsea Bush	Model/Singer	Brentwood, TN	Episode 5
C.J. Miller	Coffee Barista	Los Angeles, CA	Episode 4
Monique Santiago	College Graduate (Club Dancer)	New York, NY	Episode 3
Ashley Michaelson	Designer's Assistant	Rochester, NY	Episode 2
Hadiyyah-lah Sa'id	Receptionist	Minneapolis, MN	Episode 1

== Episode progress ==
Contestants	Episodes							
Contestants	1	2	3	4	5	6	7	8
Julia	SAFE	SAFE	WIN	SAFE	SAFE	SAFE	SAFE	WINNER
Joel	WIN	SAFE	WIN	WIN	RISK	WIN	RISK	RUNNER-UP
Billy	WIN	WIN	WIN	RISK	WIN	SAFE	WIN	OUT
Laura	SAFE	SAFE	WIN	SAFE	SAFE	RISK	OUT	
Ray	SAFE	SAFE	SAFE	SAFE	SAFE	OUT		
Chelsea	RISK	SAFE	SAFE	SAFE	OUT			
C.J.	SAFE	RISK	RISK	OUT				
Monique	SAFE	SAFE	OUT					
Ashley	SAFE	OUT						
Hadiyyah-lah	OUT							

The contestant won the challenge and was safe from elimination.
The contestant did not win the challenge, but was safe from elimination.
The contestant was at risk of elimination.
The contestant was eliminated.

== Hidden Camera Challenges ==
Contestants	Challenges							
Contestants	1	2	3	4	5	6	7	8
Julia	PASS	PASS	PASS	PASS	PASS	PASS	PASS	PASS
Joel	PASS	PASS	FAIL	FAIL	FAIL	FAIL	FAIL	FAIL
Billy	PASS	PASS	FAIL	FAIL	PASS	FAIL	PASS	PASS
Laura	FAIL	PASS	FAIL	PASS	PASS	FAIL	FAIL	
Ray	FAIL	FAIL	FAIL	PASS	PASS	FAIL		
Chelsea	PASS	FAIL	FAIL	PASS	FAIL			
C.J.	PASS	PASS	PASS	FAIL				
Monique	PASS	FAIL	FAIL					
Ashley	PASS	FAIL						
Hadiyyah-lah	FAIL							

== Episodes ==
=== The Science of Beauty ===
First aired January 5, 2009

The contestants are taken to a doctor/beauty expert for what they are told is a series of measurements to assess their "beauty score". What the contestants don't know is that they are being observed on a hidden camera to see if they will look at the personal files of the other contestants. After the measurements are taken, each contestant is given his/her beauty score, which is calculated by the beauty expert. They were told that anything over an 85 is beautiful, and anything over 95 is star quality. The scores are: Joel and Billy 95; Ashley, C.J. and Laura 94; Ray 92; Julia and Monique 91; Chelsea and Hadiyyah-lah at risk for elimination.

The bottom two are put into a final hidden camera challenge where they encounter an actor trying to enter a building with his hands full with cups of coffee. In the end, Hadiyyah-lah is eliminated for her behavior on hidden camera, including looking through C.J.'s personal file and not holding the door for the actor holding the cups of coffee.

- Winners: Joel and Billy
- Bottom Two: Chelsea and Hadiyyah-lah
- Eliminated: Hadiyyah-lah

=== Million Dollar Look ===
First aired January 12, 2009

The contestants are split into three teams and sent to Melrose Avenue to assemble three complete outfits using only their beauty and $100 per team. The teams are Billy, Laura, and Julia; Ashley, C.J., and Chelsea; Joel, Ray, and Monique. Ashley and C.J. deceive unsuspecting pedestrians with the claim that they are collecting donations for charity. Chelsea states that she is uncomfortable with lying and refuses to participate. C.J. eventually felt guilty for deceiving and stops, but Ashley continues. In a hidden camera challenge, the contestants are tested to see if they will donate any of the $100 to a woman at a charity collection table. All of the contestants donate money with the exception of Chelsea, Ashley, Monique, and Ray.

At a fashion show, contestants model their assembled outfits for the judges who assign "price tags" to each outfit. The price of each outfit is determined by overall style as well as each contestant's behavior during the previous shopping trip. Billy is the winner and is given the $1,000,000 price tag and a $5000 shopping spree. Joel is given the $750,000 tag; Julia $500,000; Laura $100,000; Monique $10,000; Ray $1,000; Chelsea $75. Ashley and C.J. come in last place and are given $10 price tags.

On their way to the "hall of beauty", C.J. and Ashley are given a final test to see if they will help a bicycle messenger who falls off his bike in front of each of them. C.J. helps, while Ashley doesn't. In the end, Ashley is eliminated for her behavior on hidden camera, including lying in the shopping challenge, not giving money to charity, and not helping the bicycle messenger.

- Winner: Billy
- Bottom Two: Ashley and C.J.
- Eliminated: Ashley

=== Beauty in Motion ===
First aired January 19, 2009

The contestants are divided into two teams for an "action photo shoot" challenge. The teams are sent to the gym for wardrobe fitting and to practice one of four different sports in preparation for a photo shoot the following day. Each team selects a team captain (Joel and C.J.), who it is later revealed will be automatically up for elimination if the team loses. The red team consists of Joel (karate), Laura (tennis), Billy (basketball), and Julia (volleyball). The blue team consists of C.J. (tennis), Monique (karate), Chelsea (volleyball), and Ray (basketball). The wardrobe assistant is actually an actress who acts as though she is having a bad day. The contestants are tested to see if they will comfort her when she is upset. Julia and C.J. are the only ones who pass the test.

After the photo shoot, the judges critique each team's photos, and pronounce the red team the winners of the challenge. As the captain of the blue team, C.J. is automatically in the bottom two, and is joined by Monique, who is told that she had the worst photo.

On their way to the "hall of beauty", C.J. and Monique are given their final test to see if they will pick up a discarded water bottle, thrown on the sidewalk in front of them. C.J. picks up the bottle and throws it in the trash, while Monique simply walks by. In the end, Monique is eliminated for saying insulting things about Chelsea, failing to comfort the wardrobe assistant, not donating money in the charity challenge, and not picking up the discarded water bottle.

- Winner: Laura, Julia, Joel, Billy
- Bottom Two: Monique, C.J.
- Eliminated: Monique

=== Timeless Beauty ===
First aired January 26, 2009

The contestants are taken to a photo studio for a "Timeless Beauty" photo challenge. Each contestant is matched with a senior citizen, and they are asked to create a photo, style, and original slogan which illustrates the teams concept of timeless beauty. What the contestants don't know is that they are being judged on their respect for elders. In the wardrobe room, there is only one make-up chair. While most of the contestants offer this seat to their senior partner, C.J., Billy, and Joel do not. In the photo shoot, Billy doesn't appear to respect his partner's opinion, and is more concerned with how he himself looks on camera.

Back at the house, Vanessa has each of the contestants impersonate another contestant. The winner, as judged by the group, would be allowed to look at the photos. Joel wins this competition, and tells Billy that he looks "cheesy" and C.J. that the photographer selected C.J.'s least favorite pose. C.J. is upset by the news. Later, all of the contestants are allowed to see their photos, and the judges select Joel as the winner, with Billy and C.J. in the bottom two.

On their way to the "hall of beauty", Billy and C.J. are given their final test to see if they will help a young girl who is crying because she has lost her mother. Both Billy and C.J. help, staying with her until the girl's mother returns. In the end, C.J. is eliminated for his deceptive behavior in the charity challenge (episode 2), verbal outbursts at the house, and disagreement with the judges over the selection of his "best pose" in the "timeless beauty" photo shoot.

- Winner: Joel
- Bottom Two: Billy, C.J.
- Eliminated: C.J.

=== Natural Beauty ===
First aired February 2, 2009

For their first challenge, the contestants are split into teams of two and asked to select one personal item which they "cannot live without". After selecting their items, the teams are told they will be shooting a 30 second video clip for a new "organic lifestyle" company promoting "natural beauty", and the only item they will be allowed to bring along is the personal item they just selected. At the challenge, the teams (Julia & Laura, Chelsea & Ray, and Billy & Joel) hike five miles to a beach where they camp for the night. The next morning, the contestants are awakened at 5 am, and are given video cameras with which to film one another. What the contestants don't know is that they are being judged on their teamwork. While most of the contestants pass the challenge, Chelsea appears uninterested in helping Ray, and Joel is argumentative, disobeying a lifeguard's instructions.

Back at the house Vanessa reveals the results of the challenge. Billy is praised for his performance and wins the challenge. Chelsea and Joel are both criticized, placing in the bottom two.

On their way to the "hall of beauty", Chelsea and Joel are given their final test. A gardener "accidentally" sprays them in the process of watering some plants. Joel maintains his composure, while Chelsea curses. In the end, Chelsea is eliminated for her attitude towards the other contestants, lack of sympathy during the "action photo shoot" in episode 3, and cursing at the gardener.

- Winner: Billy
- Bottom Two: Chelsea, Joel
- Eliminated: Chelsea

=== Get Fit ===
First aired February 9, 2009

The contestants are taken to sports field for a physical fitness challenge. Each contestant must complete six different fitness tests: body composition, push-ups, pull-ups, sit-ups, flexibility, and an obstacle course. What the contestants don't know is that they are being judged on their demonstration of courtesy towards others and sportsmanship, rather than their physical performance. A group of teenage moderators and a gym teacher decides which contestant possesses the most inner and outer beauty. In the body composition test, the scale is falsely calibrated to read approximately 10 pounds (4.5 kg) heavier than the actual measured weight. After completing all six tests, the contestants and moderators have a lunch break. The moderators purposely group themselves unevenly between two tables, with one "lonely kid" sitting at a table by himself. Julia, who talks to the lonely kid, is the only one to pass this test. In contrast, Ray inappropriately jokes with the larger group that lonely kid "is going to grow up to be a sniper." After lunch, Vanessa tells the contestants that their physical performance in the challenge does not matter, and that the teenagers will be voting on who they feel is the most beautiful. After some deliberation, it is revealed that Joel has won the competition, Julia and Billy are safe, while Laura and Ray are up for elimination.

On their way to the "hall of beauty", Laura and Ray are given their final test. A homeless man pushing a shopping cart full of aluminum cans falls, spilling the cans on the ground. Both Laura and Ray stop to help the man, passing the test. In the end, Ray is eliminated for looking through the other contestants' files in episode one, not consoling the wardrobe assistant in episode three, making rude comments about Billy in episode five, and saying that the "lonely" kid is "going to grow up to be a sniper."

- Winner: Joel
- Bottom Two: Ray, Laura
- Eliminated: Ray

=== Red Carpet Mamas ===
First aired February 16, 2009

The contestants are taken to a beauty salon in preparation for a "high society function" with a "red carpet" entrance later that evening. The contestants are surprised to find out that their dates for the evening are their parents. Laura, Joel, and Julia are paired with their mothers, and Billy is paired with his father. An actor, posing as a stylist, has a private consultation with each contestant. The contestants are tested to see if they will "sell out" their fellow castmates. Both Billy and Julia pass, while both Laura and Joel make disparaging remarks about Billy, failing the test. Each parent is taken to a room with racks of clothes and asked to select a suit or dress for the son or daughter. Laura is not happy with her mother's selection, but does not publicly express her true opinion.

Later that evening, on the red carpet, the contestants are judged on their ability to "work the room", socializing with the other people at the function. What the contestants don't know is that Ashton Kutcher's mother (Diane) is there as a secret judge. At the end of the evening, Diane feels that Joel did the best, while Billy and Julia seemed to be "selling themselves", and Laura had a hard time making conversation as she was "too into herself". After some deliberation, the contestants are told that Billy has won the challenge, Julia is safe, and Joel and Laura are in the bottom two.

At the hall of beauty, Joel and Laura each plead their case. Ultimately, Laura is eliminated for being too self-absorbed, making disparaging remarks about the other contestants, looking through other contestants files in episode one, not sympathizing with the wardrobe assistant in episode three, not fully participating in the fitness challenge in episode six, and making disparaging comments about Billy in the private consultation.

- Winner: Billy
- Bottom Two: Joel, Laura
- Eliminated: Laura

=== Finale ===
First aired February 23, 2009

The contestants are taken to a studio for the People magazine challenge, which includes a one-on-one interview with Jess Cagle (an executive editor) and a photo shoot with Matthew Rolston. What the contestants don't know is that Jess is judging their grace under pressure, humility, and modesty. Both Julia and Billy pass the test, while Joel fails after making immodest comments. In her interview, Julia reveals that she had to give up her beauty pageant title after receiving a ticket for "public intoxication"; an event which she cites as her biggest regret. For the photo shoot, the contestants are dressed in only a towel and covered in oil. Julia is initially nervous about appearing semi-nude in a photograph, but overcomes her apprehension. After reviewing the photos, the contestants are told that they all performed equally well, and hence, all three will have to go to the "hall of beauty".

In the kitchen, at the house, the contestants are given a note asking them to go downstairs. Upon descending the stairs, they find an open door to a room they had not been allowed to access before. This room is the "observation room", where the judges would monitor the hidden cameras placed throughout the house. Vanessa appears on the screen and informs the contestants that they have been judged on both their inner and outer beauty. The contestants are shown a montage of clips of their worst behavior. Joel is most deeply troubled by this development, as he feels his "passion" has been misconstrued.

At the "hall of beauty", each contestant is asked to state why he or she feels that he or she should be declared the winner of the competition. First, Billy is informed that he has placed third, then Julia is declared the winner of the $100,000 prize and a photo in the Most Beautiful People issue of People magazine. Furthermore, Julia is told that she is the only one to pass all eight of the hidden camera challenges: honesty, charity, compassion, consideration, teamwork, decency, loyalty, and modesty.

- Winner: Julia
- Runner-Up: Joel
- Eliminated: Billy

== International airdates ==
Country / Region	Network	Premiere
Australia	Channel Seven	July 16, 2009
Greece	Fox Life	February 28, 2011
Netherlands	RTL 5	September 2009
New Zealand	TV2	October 15, 2010
Hong Kong	ATV World	February 5, 2010
Southeast Asia, Taiwan, Hong Kong & India	STAR World	January 7, 2011
Philippines	ETC	April 11, 2011
