= True Beauty season 2 =

True Beauty
- Season 2
- Judges: Vanessa Minnillo; Carson Kressley; Beth Stern

Release
- Original network: ABC
- Original release: May 31 – July 19, 2010

Season chronology
- ← Previous; Season 1

True Beauty (season 2) is the second season of the reality television series True Beauty. In a format similar to the first season, the contestants are competing to see who is the most beautiful. However, they think they are only being tested on outer beauty when in fact the judges are also evaluating their inner beauty through a series of hidden-camera challenges. Filming of the second season of True Beauty was add on facebook completed in Las Vegas in October 2009 and featured judges Beth Ostrosky Stern and Carson Kressley, among others. As a ruse to keep contestants ignorant of the show's true premise, ABC producers told participants they would be competing in a new modeling reality show known as Face of Vegas. In addition, contestants did not interact with Vanessa Minnillo, the only judge retained from the previous season, until after being eliminated. In each episode, all contestants were subjected to a main hidden-camera challenge. A second, "final straw" challenge was put only to the bottom two contestants in most cases. The second season premiered May 31, 2010 on ABC...

== Contestants ==
Name	Age	Occupation	Hometown	Eliminated
Taylor Bills	24	Former Arizona League Pro Baseball Player	Irvine, CA	Winner
Erika Othen	25	Model/Singer/Songwriter/Radio Host	Long Island, NY	Runner-up
Craig Franczyk	29	Retail Manager	Winnipeg, Canada	Episode 8
Amy Schmoldt	22	Model/Bartender	East Brunswick, NJ	Episode 7
Michelle Mozek	21	Dallas Mavericks Dancer	Bedford, TX	Episode 6
Liz Parada	31	Model/Actress	Hollywood, FL	Episode 5
David Palmer	24	DJ/Astrologer/Radio Host	Huntington Beach, CA	Episode 4
Regina Villano	22	Actress/Model/Miss Teen NJ	Tabernacle, NJ	Episode 3
Michael Allen	25	Server/Actor/Model	Miami, FL	Episode 2
JD Scott	26	Real Estate Agent	Los Angeles, CA	Episode 1

=== Episode progress ===
Contestants	Episodes							
Contestants	1	2	3	4	5	6	7	8
Taylor	SAFE	SAFE	RISK	SAFE	WIN	WIN	SAFE	WINNER
Erika	SAFE	HIGH	HIGH	WIN	SAFE	SAFE	WIN	RUNNER-UP
Craig	HIGH	SAFE	WIN	RISK	HIGH	HIGH	RISK	OUT
Amy	SAFE	WIN	SAFE	SAFE	SAFE	RISK	OUT	
Michelle	SAFE	SAFE	SAFE	HIGH	RISK	OUT		
Liz	WIN	SAFE	RISK	SAFE	OUT			
David	RISK	SAFE	SAFE	OUT				
Regina	SAFE	RISK	DQ					
Michael	SAFE	OUT						
JD	OUT							

The contestant won the competition.
The contestant won the challenge and was safe from elimination.
The contestant came second in the weekly challenge.
The contestant did not win the challenge, but was safe from elimination.
The contestant was at risk of elimination.
The contestant was eliminated.
The contestant was disqualified.

=== Hidden Camera Challenges ===
Contestants	Challenges									
Contestants	1	2	3		4	5	6		7	
Taylor	PASS	PASS	PASS	FAIL	PASS	PASS	FAIL	PASS	PASS	PASS
Erika	PASS	PASS	FAIL	PASS	PASS	PASS	PASS	PASS	PASS	PASS
Craig	FAIL	FAIL	PASS	PASS	FAIL	PASS	PASS	PASS	FAIL	FAIL
Amy	PASS	PASS	FAIL	PASS	PASS	PASS	FAIL	PASS	FAIL	PASS
Michelle	PASS	FAIL	FAIL	PASS	PASS	PASS	FAIL	FAIL		
Liz	FAIL	FAIL	FAIL	PASS	FAIL	FAIL				
David	PASS	PASS	PASS	PASS	FAIL					
Regina	PASS	PASS	FAIL	FAIL						
Michael	FAIL	PASS								
JD	FAIL									

== Episodes ==
=== 1 – The Stealing Challenge ===
First aired May 31, 2010

The contestants, working with a fake stylist hired by the producers, have a $200 budget and 20 minutes to create a signature Vegas look; the stylist gives each player a chance to steal an item that exceeded their budget in order to get an edge in the competition. Liz, Michael, Craig, and JD are caught on hidden camera violating the rules by accepting the item offered by the stylist. The contestants put on their outfits and are placed in glass boxes on the street of Las Vegas. People passing by are given one token to give to the contestant of their choice. Amy dresses as a bride, Craig a cowboy, David as Elvis, Erika as Marilyn Monroe, JD as a drag queen, Liz as a glitzy go-go dancer, Michael as a pimp, Michelle as a pin-up girl, Regina as Lady Luck, and Taylor as a rocker. Liz gains the most tokens with her provocative and revealing (but stolen) outfit and wins the challenge. David and JD receive the lowest number of tokens and must face elimination.

The contestants had already encountered the final straw challenge earlier. On their way into the store where they created their signature look, they were blocked by a woman who had become tangled in her dog's leash. JD untangled her, while David made his way around her without helping, saying he was too busy. In subsequent episodes, it was shown that Amy, Craig, and Michelle also passed her by without helping. The bottom two face the judges for the first elimination. Unaware of the hidden camera footage, JD argues that his willingness to dress in drag shows how badly he wants to win while David argues that his Elvis outfit fit better with the Las Vegas theme. David, who had not stolen an item, is pronounced safe. JD is eliminated and is shown the footage of him accepting the extra item out of budget.

- Winner: Liz
- Bottom Two: David and JD
- Eliminated: JD

=== 2 – The Secret ===
First aired June 7, 2010

The contestants are taught a magic trick which they must demonstrate for magicians Penn and Teller. The contestants are specifically instructed by Penn and Teller to keep the magic trick details a secret. Later, each contestant meets with a reporter from People magazine (a real People reporter who is aware of the setup), who tries to get them to tell how the trick is performed. Craig, Liz, and Michelle all fail the test, revealing the secret behind trick to the reporter. Penn and Teller decide that Amy performed the trick the best, and as a reward, she is featured in the magicians' live Las Vegas show. Michael and Regina perform the worst, and must face elimination.

On the way to the elimination, Michael and Regina face the final straw challenge. Each contestant observes an intoxicated man (actually an actor) attempting to drive away from the hotel. Regina stops the man from driving, while Michael does nothing to intervene. In the end, it is Michael who is eliminated. Before he leaves, he is shown footage of him breaking the rules in the first episode, making disparaging remarks about Liz, and not intervening to prevent the intoxicated man from driving.

- Winner: Amy
- Bottom Two: Michael and Regina
- Eliminated: Michael

=== 3 – Grace Under Fire ===
First aired June 14, 2010

The contestants performed "man-on-the-street" interviews with passers-by, asking them questions about Las Vegas. The contestants were given the interview questions in an envelope and instructed not to look at them before starting the interview; the questions included some difficult words. Each contestant was then sent on a long elevator ride alone, during which Amy, Erika, Liz, Michelle, and Regina all peeked in their envelopes. The judges noted that all of the women cheated while none of the men did.

The performance of the contestants was judged by a focus group of ordinary people who were not informed of the real nature of the competition. The contestants observed this focus group through a two-way mirror and were subjected to a second hidden-camera challenge, in which they were evaluated on their reaction to the focus group's criticism. Taylor and Regina both swore angrily in response to what they heard, and were deemed to have failed. Craig received the highest scores from the focus group, while Taylor and Liz received the lowest scores.

Liz and Taylor plead their cases to the judges; however, they were informed that they would both be saved because another contestant violated the rules of the competition, and they were sent back to the loft. However, the judges made it very clear in their deliberations that Liz would have been eliminated if the other contestant had not violated the rules. Regina was then brought in and informed that she was being disqualified because she had used a cell phone to contact people outside the production.

- Winner: Craig
- Bottom Two: Liz and Taylor (both saved)
- Disqualified: Regina

=== 4 – Finding the Ring ===
First aired June 21, 2010

The contestants learned that neither Liz nor Taylor had been eliminated. Later, they participated in a challenge in which they had to create a print ad for the Planet Hollywood buffet, using only food to cover their otherwise naked bodies. The food items were assigned randomly as follows: Liz, baked desserts; Craig, crabs; Taylor, sushi; Michelle, vegetables; David, fruit; Erica, ice cream; and Amy, Italian food. While each contestant waited to meet with a food stylist, he or she met the stylist's assistant Emily (actually an actress), who pretended to have lost her engagement ring. Amy, Erika, Taylor, and Michelle helped Emily look for the ring in the trash, thus passing the challenge; while Craig, Liz, and David did not help. The buffet ads were judged by Beth and Carson, who chose Erika as the winner and David and Craig as the bottom two.

The final straw challenge was a pair of actors posing as husband and wife tourists who asked the contestants to photograph them on their last night in Vegas. David agreed to help them while Craig declined. Beth and Carson also discussed David and Craig's previous behavior, and it was shown that Craig had failed to help the woman tangled with her dog during The Stealing Challenge, as had David. The judges decided that David's overall attitude was too cutthroat and he was eliminated.

- Winner: Erika
- Bottom Two: David and Craig
- Eliminated: David

=== 5 – Change My Score! ===
First aired June 28, 2010

The contestants were given one night to study a Las Vegas tourist information book in preparation for giving a guided tour of the city the next day; the basis for the next elimination would be ratings given by the tourists. After each contestant finished the tour, one tourist leaving the bus (actually an actress) made it clear that she was dissatisfied with the tour as she handed over her comment card. The tour company manager, also an actor, then offered to change the scores on the card. Only Liz failed this hidden camera challenge. She and Michelle were the bottom two, while Taylor was the winner.

The final straw was an overweight and sweaty man, another actor (in fact, the "janitor" from the ending sequence), who would mistake the contestant for a celebrity. Michelle was gracious towards the man while Liz was aloof. The judges noted that both Liz and Michelle had failed a lot of hidden camera challenges and had behaved inconsiderately towards their fellow contestants. It was also shown that Michelle didn't help the woman with a dog during The Stealing Challenge. Liz was eliminated, and she walked out of the judging chamber immediately after being shown the hidden camera footage of herself, without finishing the discussion with the judges.

- Winner: Taylor
- Bottom Two: Liz and Michelle
- Eliminated: Liz

=== 6 – Bride in Trouble ===
First aired July 5, 2010

The contestants were brought to the Little White Wedding Chapel and dressed as bridesmaids and groomsmen, at which point real couples getting married would choose two of the contestants to serve as their attendants. The first contestant to be chosen by three couples would be the winner, while the two contestants chosen by the fewest couples would be the bottom two. While the contestants were individually using the changing room, they encountered a bride and her mother, both hired actresses. The "momzilla" berated her daughter for being overweight and not fitting in any of the dresses, leaving her visibly upset. Craig and Erika offered the bride words of encouragement, while Amy, Michelle, and Taylor ignored her. In the challenge, Taylor was the first contestant to be selected by three couples, followed by Craig. After Erika was also picked for a third wedding, Amy and Michelle became the bottom two with one and two weddings, respectively.

The final straw occurred during the main challenge. A florist, actually an actress, brought each contestant a floral arrangement to use during the challenge and then offered to tell her friend, one of the brides participating in the challenge, to vote for the contestant. Amy tells the florist that she would rather meet all of the couples and let them choose, passing the final straw. Michelle accepts the florist's offer, and was deemed to have failed. Footage was not shown of the other three contestants, but the judges stated during deliberation that Michelle was the only contestant who did not pass. Michelle was eliminated.

- Winner: Taylor
- Bottom Two: Amy and Michelle
- Eliminated: Michelle

=== 7 – Stop Smoking! ===
First aired July 12, 2010

The contestants were taken directly from leisure time by the pool to be trained as blackjack dealers, after which they would be judged by a pit boss on their appearance, dealing skills, and customer satisfaction. On their individual elevator rides to where they would be trained, each contestant faced a hidden-camera challenge in which a pregnant woman (actually a non-pregnant actress) smoked and drank alcohol while chatting with a girlfriend. Taylor and Erika challenged the woman on her actions, passing the challenge. Craig and Amy said nothing and failed. Then, while being trained by one of two blackjack dealers, a pit boss berated the trainer for various shortcomings; this was a second hidden-camera challenge, and both trainers and the pit boss were all actors. Only Craig failed this challenge, by not speaking up on behalf of the trainer. During the blackjack challenge, the contestants were judged by an actual Planet Hollywood pit boss who chose Erika as the winner and put Craig and Amy in the bottom two.

On the way to the final judging, the contestants encountered the final straw. An actress posed as a mother with a baby and knocked over a piece of luggage while her arms were full. Craig picked it up for her while Amy did not. The judges noted that Craig and Amy both had mixed records on the hidden-camera challenges, but that Amy was lacking in confidence and had spoken about Liz behind her back. Amy was eliminated.

- Winner: Erika
- Bottom Two: Amy and Craig
- Eliminated: Amy

=== 8 – The Final Test ===
First aired July 19, 2010

The contestants were brought to a hangar where they were told that they would have an opportunity to enjoy the Vegas nightlife, but that they'd also be showing a good time to Steve-O and his spiritual advisor, Guy Friendly. At 6 am, after spending a wild night out with the pair, the contestants were informed that they would have to participate in their next challenge, filming a commercial for Las Vegas without having the opportunity to sleep. The judges wanted to see how the contestants would react to this situation; Erika was the only one to complain, but this was not officially a hidden-camera challenge. Later, Beth and Carson informed the contestants that all three of them had won the challenge; none of them would be eliminated prior to the final judging to determine the overall winner.

After the challenge, Beth and Carson gave the contestants a key to the judges' "spy room". There, Vanessa Minnillo appeared on a video screen and informed the contestants of the real nature of the competition. They were then shown footage of their bad behavior. At the final judging, the contestants came face-to-face with all three judges for the first time. The contestants plead their cases after the judges asked them about specific aspects of their behavior. Erika was asked if aspects of her behavior are fake; in her plea, she focused on having grown as a person through this experience and seeing the potential for greatness in herself. The judges asked Craig if he had failed to love others the same way he loves himself; he admitted that he had "missed the point" in this respect, and he returned the vest he stole in the first episode. Taylor was called out on the temper he had exhibited; he spoke about wanting to be a role model. After deliberating, the judges announced that Craig was the last contestant to be eliminated. A giant slot machine then revealed that Taylor was the "True Beauty" placing Erika as runner-up.

- Winner: Taylor
- Runner-Up: Erika
- Eliminated: Craig
