= Joel Rush =

American actor, model (b. 1981)

- Born: August 26, 1981 (age 43); Logansport, Indiana, U.S.
- Occupation: Actor
- Years active: 2009–present

Joel Rush (born August 26, 1981) is an American actor and model, best known for his role as Edward "Eddie" Willis in the Oprah Winfrey Network prime time soap opera, If Loving You Is Wrong.

== Life and career ==
Rush was born in Logansport, Indiana. In 2009, he was the runner-up of the first season of ABC competition reality show True Beauty. He later began appearing on television, include a recurring role on the NBC daytime soap opera Days of Our Lives, and guest starring roles in Make It or Break It, Big Time Rush, Betty White's Off Their Rockers, and Femme Fatales. Rush also appeared in a number of gay romantic comedy films, including Eating Out: Drama Camp (2011), Eating Out: The Open Weekend (2011), and Love or Whatever (2012).

In 2014, Rush was cast as Edward 'Eddie' Willis in the Oprah Winfrey Network prime time soap opera, If Loving You Is Wrong. He later has appeared in films Bachelors (2015), Naked (2017), Honey: Rise Up and Dance (2018), This Is Our Christmas (2018), A Madea Family Funeral (2019) and The Trap (2019). On television, he had a recurring role on Netflix series Lucifer as Zadkiel in 2021, and on HBO comedy The Righteous Gemstones in 2022.

== Filmography ==
=== Film ===
Year	Title	Role	Notes
2011	Eating Out: Drama Camp	Andy	
2011	Eating Out: The Open Weekend	Andy	
2012	Love or Whatever	Pete	
2013	Four of Hearts	Kevin	
2013	Out West	Buck Wildstone	
2015	Bachelors	Jesse	
2017	Naked	Groom	
2018	Honey: Rise Up and Dance	Luke	
2018	Runnin' from My Roots	Cameron Somers	
2018	This Is Our Christmas	Mike Davenport	
2019	A Madea Family Funeral	Officer	
2019	The Trap	Powers	
2021	Beverly Hills Christmas 2 Director's Cut	Mike Davenport	
2021	The Shallow	Simpson	

=== Television ===
Year	Title	Role	Notes
2009–2011	Days of Our Lives	Assistant Manager / Chez Rouge Patron	7 episodes
2010	Make It or Break It	Carlos	Episode: "Are We Family?"
2010	Party Down	Sato	Episode: "Party Down Company Picnic"
2010	Big Time Rush	Hunky Manager	Episode: "Big Time Christmas"
2012	The Ropes	Ralph	2 episodes
2012	Betty White's Off Their Rockers	Hunky Police Officer	2 episodes
2012	Femme Fatales	Pecs	Episode: "16 Minutes of Fame"
2013	Marked	Ryan	Television film
2013	My Synthesized Life	Sam	Episode: "Turn the Music Off"
2013	Ironside	Brian	Episode: "Sleeping Dogs"
2013	Christmas in the City	Hunky Santa #1	Television film
2014–2017	If Loving You Is Wrong	Edward 'Eddie' Willis	61 episodes
2018	MacGyver	Darryl	Episode: "Riley + Airplane"
2021	Genius	First Famous Producer	Episode: "Aretha: Young, Gifted and Black"
2021	Lucifer	Zadkiel	3 episodes
2022	The Righteous Gemstones	Sky	6 episodes
