= America's Next Top Model season 4 =

America's Next Top Model
- Season 4
- Judges: Tyra Banks; Janice Dickinson; Nigel Barker; Nolé Marin
- No. of contestants: 14
- Winner: Naima Mora
- No. of episodes: 13

Release
- Original network: UPN
- Original release: March 2 – May 18, 2005

Additional information
- Filming dates: August 30 – October 20, 2004

Season chronology
- ← Previous; Season 3 Next → Season 5

The fourth season of America's Next Top Model aired in spring 2005, with the shooting location being moved from New York City to Los Angeles. The catchphrase of the season was "Dive In."

These were the last appearances of Janice Dickinson and Nolé Marin as judges and the Beauty Tip of the Week was replaced by the My Life as a CoverGirl segment. The house that the contestants stayed in the first half of the competition was later used in The CW TV series (successor to UPN with the WB) The Pussycat Dolls Present: Girlicious and the Oxygen TV series Pretty Wicked.

The international destination for the cycle was Cape Town, South Africa, the show's first visit to Africa and only visit to Southern Africa.

The winner was 20-year-old Naima Mora from Detroit, Michigan, then Kahlen Rondot had been the runner-up.

The prizes for this cycle were a modeling contract with Ford Models, a fashion spread and cover in Elle magazine, and a US$100,000 contract with CoverGirl cosmetics.

== Contestants ==
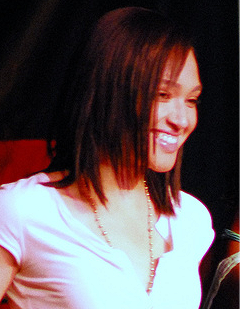
Naima Mora

(Ages stated are at start of contest)

Contestant	Age	Height	Hometown	Finish	Place
Brita Petersons	25	5 ft 9 in (1.75 m)	La Cañada, California	Episode 2	14
Sarah Dankelman	22	5 ft 9 in (1.75 m)	Hamilton, Maryland	Episode 3	13
Brandy Rusher	20	5 ft 8 in (1.73 m)	Houston, Texas	Episode 4	12
Noelle Staggers	20	5 ft 7.5 in (1.71 m)	Reno, Nevada	Episode 5	11
Lluvy Gomez	21	5 ft 11 in (1.80 m)	Modesto, California	Episode 6	10
Rebecca Epley	22	5 ft 10 in (1.78 m)	Stillwater, Minnesota	Episode 7	9-8
Tiffany Richardson	21	5 ft 11 in (1.80 m)	Miami Gardens, Florida	Episode 7	9-8
Tatiana Dante	18	5 ft 10 in (1.78 m)	Maui, Hawaii	Episode 8	7
Michelle Deighton	19	5 ft 10 in (1.78 m)	Terre Haute, Indiana	Episode 9	6
Christina Murphy	24	5 ft 10 in (1.78 m)	Tallahassee, Florida	Episode 10	5
Brittany Brower	22	6 ft 0 in (1.83 m)	Tallahassee, Florida	Episode 11	4
Keenyah Hill	19	5 ft 11.5 in (1.82 m)	Compton, California	Episode 13	3
Kahlen Rondot	21	5 ft 8 in (1.73 m)	Broken Arrow, Oklahoma	Episode 13	2
Naima Mora	20	5 ft 9.5 in (1.77 m)	Detroit, Michigan	Episode 13	1

== Episodes ==
No. overall	No. in season	Title	Original release date	US viewers (millions)
34	1	"The Girl Who is a Lady Kat... Reow!"	March 2, 2005	5.08
This cycle's casting included both Tiffany Richardson and Mary Nnenna Nwokoma, both from the previous Cycle reauditioning. At panel, Tiffany revealed she has taken anger management classes, Kahlen impressed everyone despite never having watched the show before, Brittany was compared to Janice Dickinson, Lluvy revealed she was once part of a gang, and Naima recounted her dysfunctional childhood. In between auditions, the girls took part in a truth or dare, enjoyed a night at a club or a bowling alley (depending on their age) and celebrated two of the contestants' birthdays, where Lady Kat made a few enemies among the contestants. After the first cut, the contestants were told they were going to do their shoot in a photo machine. Eventually, fourteen contestants (including Tiffany) were called and Mary was once again left out, despite showing more personality and confidence, and told Tyra that she broke her heart.
35	2	"The Girls Who Hate Their Makeovers"	March 9, 2005	5.12
The fourteen contestants arrived at Paramount Pictures studios in Los Angeles with a New York movie set. They began with Jay Manuel, the show's director of photography, where they met the judges, Nigel Barker, Janice Dickinson, and Nolé Marin. The judges were dressed as the "fashion police" and introduced the contestants to their first photoshoot, Aliens in Manhattan. Many contestants impressed the judges, but Brandy complained about having to wait, which irked photographer Nigel. After the shoot, the contestants were driven to the luxurious house that would be their residence for the rest of the cycle. The next day, the contestants scaled their weights and measures. Later, they headed to a salon for makeovers followed by a topless photoshoot. Keenyah complained throughout the process despite loving the end result. Brandy didn't like her eyebrows bleached orange, for that her boyfriend might be disappointed with her new look. Michelle struggled with her makeover which required her to dye her hair blonde, causing her a lot of pain because of the amount of bleach they put in her hair. At the first judging, despite taking great photos, both Keenyah’s and Brandy's bad attitudes from the makeovers were frowned upon. Brandy ended up in the bottom two with Brita. In the end, Brita was eliminated because the judges thought that Brandy still had room for improvement, while Brita was unable to mask her age or weight in photos.: Featured photographer: Nigel Barker; Special guests: J. Alexander and Redell Scafé
36	3	"The Girl Who Suddenly Collapsed"	March 16, 2005	5.24
The contestants met runway coach, Miss J. Alexander, at Los Angeles Memorial Coliseum, where they were taught how to walk in a straight line, up and down gradients while carrying items. While most contestants adapted well, Sarah struggled and walked awkwardly throughout the entire duration. The next day, they were brought to Kmart for their reward challenge. They each had to pick an item to use while walking down the supermarket aisle, and the evaluation was elimination style. Rebecca won the challenge and was rewarded with designer shoes by Stuart Weitzman, along with five friends. She picked Kahlen, Sarah, Noelle, Lluvy, and Naima to share her prize. The girls who didn't win the challenge had to serve the other girls while at the Stuart Weitzman store which caused a rift between the contestants. This week's photoshoot was for 1-800-Flowers, where the girls posed with a man in the background while controlling ten dogs. Rebecca, Michelle, Keenyah, Lluvy, Tiffany, and Tatiana all excelled, while Brittany, Kahlen, and Sarah had a hard time fitting the character. While Rebecca's photo was being evaluated, she experienced a relapse of her childhood balance disorder and fainted. She was sent to the hospital and everyone decided to continue on with judging and elimination. Keenyah was criticized for her poor appearance but made up for her previous week's attitude with a stellar photo and received the first call out. Tatiana, Tiffany, Lluvy and Michelle were all praised for beautiful photos, while Kahlen, Brittany, and Sarah were criticized for their mediocre photos. Brittany was criticized for being sexy to the point where it was pornographic in her photos, but Sarah was eliminated for her low self-esteem.: Featured photographer: Danielle Levitt; Special guests: J. Alexander, Stuart Weitzman, Danilo, Mathu Anderson, and Sandi Bass; CoverGirl of the Week: Naima Mora
37	4	"The Girl With the Worst Photo in History"	March 23, 2005	4.74
The contestants were given a ballet lesson. After that, they went to dinner, where Tiffany drank too much and vomited. The next day, they talked with Beverly Johnson. Later, they were taken to a tennis court, where they were told that they were shooting various tennis shots for a big client. Unknown to them, this was actually a test to gauge their response to being under pressure. The "client" was actually an actor who was told to give the contestants a hard time. Almost all the girls got frustrated, and Brandy later took out her irritation on Tatiana. After the shoot, Jay Manuel finally revealed that the photoshoot was a test, and Naima has crowned the winner for being the only one who stayed calm under pressure. She picked Kahlen and Tiffany to accompany her on her reward, which was dinner with tennis star Serena Williams. Naima was also given an autographed tennis racquet. In this week's photoshoot, the twelve remaining contestants became the twelve signs of the zodiac and were featured in a Warneco calendar. Brittany redeemed herself by producing a stellar Sagittarius picture. Michelle, Keenyah, Kahlen, and Christina were praised for their pictures. Conversely, Lluvy's Pisces photo was deemed by Tyra as "the worst photo in the history of America's Next Top Model," which landed her in the bottom two along with Brandy, who was eliminated because of her continued bad attitude, despite taking strong photos.: Featured photographer: Tracy Bayne; Special guests: Serena Williams, Stefan Wenta, Mike Li, Mathu Anderson, and Beverly Johnson; CoverGirl of the Week: Naima Mora
38	5	"The Girl Who is Contagious"	March 30, 2005	5.56
The theme for the week was makeup application, and Jay Manuel met the girls at an art studio and introduced the task. They each had a limited amount of time to rush over to the various CoverGirl stations to apply makeup resembling "haute couture." Naima was the only one to fully grasp the concept and won the challenge. She chose Christina and Lluvy to share in her prize of Lauren Scherr custom-made handbags. Noelle called her mother, describing Michelle's facial blemishes that would not go away. These were suggested to be a "deadly and contagious flesh-eating bacteria that would cause certain death," which caused a wave of fear among the contestants who had previously shared makeup with Michelle. The pandemonium continued all the way to the photoshoot, where the contestants had to pose as different ethnicities while holding a child for a Got Milk? ad, and Jay quickly sent Michelle for medical attention. Michelle's blemish problem was revealed to be impetigo, a common bacterial skin infection usually caused by the same strain of bacteria that causes strep throat (Streptococcus pyogenes), and she began a course of topical antibiotic treatments. Because of the possible skin-to-skin contact with children, Michelle ended up posing with a doll, which caused some jealousy among the other contestants who had to pose with heavy, unwieldy children. However, Mr. Jay did recognize the fact that it was still hard for Michelle to pose, even with a doll, because the doll could not interact like a real human child. At judging, Rebecca was called first and Noelle and Lluvy landed in the bottom two. The judges felt that Noelle didn't dress like a model in person (despite okay shots) and Lluvy just couldn't deliver a good picture, but Lluvy was saved.: Featured photographers: Delaney and Gitte; Special guests: Lauren Scherr, Paul Thompson, Mathu Anderson, Danilo, Dr. Ronald Moy, and Jim De Yonker; CoverGirl of the Week: Naima Mora
39	6	"The Girl With the Deliciously Tacky Dance"	April 6, 2005	4.34
Tyra taught the contestants about the business side of modeling and introduced her parents. Tyra talked about the ins and outs of the industry and warned the girls against signing a contract without reading or understanding it. After this session, the contestants were invited to a CoverGirl Cosmetics industry party, where they were given time to converse with guests and possibly gain contacts. Unknown to them, the party was a secret challenge to see who could leave the best impression. Keenyah won the challenge and chose Brittany to accompany her for a stay at a hotel and spa. For the week's photoshoot, the contestants had to pose at an old gas station while being blasted with cold rain and strong winds. Many contestants succumbed to the surroundings. To add tension, another contestant was added to the background of each contestant. During judging, while the judges were wowed by Kahlen's strong, fierce photo, they were fed up that Lluvy and Rebecca were both not making any progress. Lluvy was eliminated in her third consecutive appearance in the bottom two, due to her inability to translate her unique beauty into film.: Featured photographer: Mathu Anderson; Special guests: Kiara Kabukuru, Eva Chen, Anaïs Lombard, Rachel Hayes, Paul Yocum, Danilo, Don Banks, and Carolyn London; CoverGirl of the Week: Naima Mora
40	7	"The Girl Who Pushes Tyra Over the Edge"	April 13, 2005	5.49
The girls were given scripts to read and memorize before having to act in a scene with male model Boris Kodjoe. While many contestants flubbed their lines due to anxiety, Naima once again won the challenge. She picked Michelle and Tatiana to share in her prize, which was $10,000 worth of diamonds. For the week's photo shoot, the contestants modeled for Wonderbra while depicting a pillow fight scene in bed with a male model Rib Hillis. Most of the contestants struggled with the awkward situation, most notably Rebecca, who was in constant worry about her fiancé's reaction. For this week's pre-evaluation test, the contestants read a passage filled with fashion-related jargon, testing their improvisational skills as well as fashion knowledge. Tiffany did not even attempt the challenge and gave up. Tyra showed her disappointment in Tiffany, prompting another weak try from Tiffany before she gave up again. This negative response landed Tiffany in the bottom two with Rebecca, whose high-fashion appeal pleased the panel, but who'd clearly struggled with the photoshoot. The judges felt that the contestants had all lost their passion and drive and needed a wake-up call. In the end, both Rebecca and Tiffany were eliminated when Tyra pulled out a blank photo, to the shock of all of the girls. Tiffany and Rebecca went over to the rest of the contestants to hug and say goodbye. Rebecca was very emotional, crying while hugging the contestants, but Tiffany smiled and lightly joked, saying to them, "Why are you guys looking all sad for?" In the midst of all this, Tyra seemed to be becoming more and more irritated. Tyra called Rebecca and Tiffany back before dismissing them from panel. While she commended Rebecca on her emotion, she criticized Tiffany for her joking attitude. When Tiffany started to explain in a combative manner, Tyra lost her cool and exploded at Tiffany, yelling at her to stop feeling sorry for herself and take responsibility for her own actions. This elimination such making the first time in the history of Top Model to have a simultaneous double elimination rather than a single elimination.: Featured photographer: Kwaku Alston; Special guests: Rib Hillis, Andrea Nachreiner, Larry Moss, and Boris Kodjoe; CoverGirl of the Week: Naima Mora
41	8	"The Girl Who Gets Bad News"	April 20, 2005	4.28
Tyra visited the contestants to air out her grievances at last week's shocking elimination. The contestants were taught how to conduct interviews. They were then put to the test as they interviewed rapper Eve. Christina was chosen as the winner because of her preparedness and clarity of speech, and won an exclusive interview on Entertainment Tonight. Tatiana also did well but, obviously, she did not win the challenge. Right before they left for the challenge, Kahlen received a message a friend of hers from high school had died. Shaken by this sudden news, Kahlen was further disturbed when it turned out that the next photo shoot would be at a cemetery, where the contestants portrayed the seven deadly sins while posing in a casket at the bottom of an eight-foot-deep grave. Jay Manuel learned of this and allowed Kahlen to opt-out of the shoot, though it would affect her placement in the competition. After some consideration, Kahlen decided to go ahead and was able to channel her depression into her "sin"—wrath. For the judging challenge this week, the panel posed as journalists asking the contestants questions in a mock press conference for the America's Next Top Model clothing line. The judges found most of the contestants let the judges get the better of them. At judging, the judges were stunned-to-death of Kahlen's incredible photo and Tyra told it was clearly one of the best photos ever in the history of the show. Michelle and Tatiana produced bland shots, however, which landed them in the bottom two both for the first time. The judges felt that Michelle had more potential and a desire to win and sent Tatiana home.: Featured photographer: Johann Wolff; Special guests: Eve and Jann Carl; CoverGirl of the Week: Naima Mora
42	9	"The Girls the Lionesses are Hunting"	April 27, 2005	4.91
The contestants were driven to an empty parking lot, where their challenge for the week required them to show their "wild side" and posed as animals. Tyra announced that the contestants that they would be flying to Cape Town, Western Cape, South Africa. In the challenge, Brittany's great facial expressions and enthusiasm won her the challenge. Upon landing in South Africa, the contestants met with Tyra, who explained the importance of South Africa in the modeling world. They were treated to traditional Zulu dancing and a scenic safari ride. At the end of en safari, Brittany was told that, as the winner of the challenge, she could pick two friends to stay with her in luxury accommodation at the safari park. She chose Christina and Keenyah, leaving the other three to rough it out and sleep in a tent in the wilderness. Ironically, as Kahlen, Naima, and Michelle bonded in their tents, Brittany, Christina, and Keenyah had to deal with a bug infestation problem at their hotel. For the photoshoot, the contestants had to pose as animals in the South African safari with a crocodile for Lubriderm. Kahlen was a springbok, Naima was a cheetah, Michelle was a zebra, Christina was an ostrich, Keenyah was an elephant and Brittany was a giraffe. Mr. Jay told Christina that this was her best shoot to date and told Kahlen that once again that she excelled. After the photoshoot, the contestants arrived at Cape Town and they arrived at a seaside hotel. At panel, the judges were once again amazed by Kahlen and her portrayal of the springbok, the national animal of South Africa. They also were amazed by Christina's photo but said once again that she lacks personality in person. Keenyah's weight issue and Michelle's inability to handle pressure landed them in the bottom two. Despite having a strong photograph, Michelle was eliminated.: Featured photographer: Gerda Gennis; Special guests: J. Alexander, Pierre Kameel, Shelton, and Mathu Anderson; CoverGirl of the Week: Naima Mora
43	10	"The Girl Who Flops in the Mud"	May 4, 2005	4.94
For their challenge, the contestants went on go-sees and met several designers in Cape Town. Several made comments about Keenyah's weight problem, but in the end, she won the challenge and picked Brittany to accompany her to designer Craig Port's house. Naima was the only one who missed the 4:30 p.m. deadline by 45 minutes. She got criticized for it because she felt it was important to go on every go-see. This episode revealed the first crack in Brittany and Keenyah's seemingly solid friendship. Brittany unwittingly stole the show from Keenyah at Craig Port's party, getting drunk off many glasses of wine and ending the evening mimicking the doggy style sex position with Craig Port while the other guests looked on and laughed. Keenyah regretted bringing Brittany along. For this week's photoshoot, the contestants were taken deep into the South African jungle, and they stopped at a picturesque waterfall for their shoot. They had to make their own outfits from their surroundings, including leaves and mud. Brittany flopped around in mud to make her outfit. At judging, the contestants were told to critique each other's photos, and state who they felt had the most and least amount of potential, with Kahlen receiving most praise and Christina the least. Kahlen and Naima amazed the judges with their acute fashion-based analysis, while Brittany's comments lacked insight, landing her in the bottom two with Christina who found herself in the bottom two for the first time ever. Although Tyra referred to Christina as "the contestant with a heart of an angel," the judges found her personality "icy cold." That, and her inability to mask this in front of the panel got her eliminated.: Featured photographer: Anton Robert; Special guests: Craig Port, Jackie Burger, Jim De Yonker, Mathu Anderson, Paola Devito, Charlene Witte, Jo Carlin, Christiaan Gabriel Du Toit, and Gavin Rajah; CoverGirl of the Week: Naima Mora
44	11	"The Girl Who is Special"	May 11, 2005	5.54
The reward challenge this week required the contestants to learn the traditional South African dance and performed it in front of a live audience. Keenyah told the South African dancers that she felt like she was "home," and that she had much more of a connection with South Africa since she is the only black contestant, which Naima took offense to as she was half-black. Naima got her fourth challenge win of the season and won thirty extra frames for the photoshoot. She was allowed to pick friends to share with her the reward of extra frames, and Kahlen was strategically left out due to Naima perceiving her as the biggest threat. The contestants were brought to Robben Island and see Nelson Mandela's cell afterward. Keenyah, who felt a connection with her roots in Africa, and hearing of Mandela's ordeal for democracy, cried, even though she didn’t know whether Nelson Mandela was alive or not. This irked the contestants, most notably Brittany, who was irritated that Keenyah whined to her how great Mandela was but did not even know whether he was alive or dead. At the prison, the guide passed a key to Naima to open the cell, which upset Keenyah because she thought that it was her birth right. The bad air was cleared momentarily as the top four soaked in the history of the location. After this, the contestants were brought to Mandela's residence, where they listened to Mandela's advice and philosophy. Later, Brittany attacked Keenyah as “selfish” for getting upset because she didn’t get to open Mandela’s cell and accused Keenyah of only wanting to open the cell because she was black. Keenyah defended herself, saying that it was an “emotional moment” for her and Brittany “did not know how (she) felt at that moment”. Back at the hotel, Keenyah denied that she was upset that she didn’t get to open the cell because of her race, but the fight reduced Kahlen to tears. For the photoshoot, the contestants posed while dancing with male models. Naima and Brittany excelled, but Keenyah got disturbed when her male model touched her and grunted in her ear, and confronted him after the shoot. Kahlen, who up until now was producing stellar photos, had her worst photoshoot ever, and admitted that she still wasn't comfortable "being sexy." On the drive back, Keenyah complained about the incident with the male model. The girls, already irritated by her actions throughout the day, ignored her. When she touched on the subject about the cell, Brittany finally let loose and gave Keenyah a severe verbal lashing. This confrontation took its toll on Brittany, who landed in the bottom two with Naima for her dwindling personality, for her stifled personality, despite both having great pictures. In the end, the judges felt that Brittany's defeated demeanor was too obvious to ignore and she was eliminated in her third bottom two appearance.: Featured photographer: Johan Wilke; Special guests: J. Alexander, Alfred Hinkel, Modise Phekouyane, Jackie Manyepelo, Mandela Mokoena, and Bebe; CoverGirl of the Week: Naima Mora
45	12	"What the Girls Did That You've Never Seen Before"	May 17, 2005	2.70
This was the recap episode of the cycle, which aired one day before the finale. Never before seen footage included Christina and Naima being "passionate" along with Kahlen's, Christina's, and Brittany's moms coming to visit and some indoor roughhousing.
46	13	"The Girl Who Walks on Water"	May 18, 2005	6.07
The top three contestants met Jay Manuel and shot a commercial and print ad for CoverGirl. The theme of the commercial was a runway show gone wrong. Kahlen produced what was deemed to be a stunning CoverGirl shot, but her performance in the commercial was moderate. Naima’s Covergirl photo and the commercial were praised by the judges whereas Keenyah, on the other hand, only had a decent commercial and photo. Keenyah was the twelfth girl eliminated in her second bottom two appearance.: Featured photographer: Helmut Rautenbach; Featured commercial director: Russel Underhill; Special guests: J. Alexander, Mathu Anderson, and Gretha Scholtz; For their final runway walk, the final two met Ms. J at a runway partially submerged underwater and were given a course about how to stomp on water. At night, the show began as Kahlen and Naima emerged from behind a waterfall and strutted down the runway together with a bevy of other models. At panel, the judges were torn between the high fashion appeal of Kahlen and Naima's commercial appeal. While they felt Kahlen's pictures had been consistently stronger, Naima was solid in her final runway assessment and did own it. Tyra compared Kahlen to a girl who "did good all semester, but failed to live up to the hype" and Naima to a girl who "did fair during the semester, and killed the final exams." The finalists were called back into panel where it was then announced that Naima was the fourth winner of America's Next Top Model.: Special guests: Gavin Rajah and Robyn Lidsky; CoverGirl of the Week: Naima Mora

== Return to the Runway ==
The Return to the Runway special aired on September 20, 2005, preceding the premiere of the fifth cycle. In this "Where are they now?" episode, we learned:

Appearing (in order)

- Naima shot a premiere episode in season 2 of Veronica Mars.
- Brittany is represented by NEXT Model Management.
- Brita has signed with Ford Models and has her own billboard.
- Keenyah has been seen in various ads and appeared on an episode of The Bold and the Beautiful.
- Tiffany has been featured on the cover of an International Hair magazine and does community service as a teen counselor.
- Lluvy is getting married and shot a bridal magazine cover.
- Michelle is working on her body and has signed with Wilhelmina in New York.
- Noelle is taking care of her son back home and plans to model.
- Christina has walked runways for San Francisco fashion week.
- Rebecca signed with VNY Model Management and has appeared in various magazines, including Cosmopolitan.
- Brandy is continuing to meet with various agencies.
- Kahlen is doing test shoots to expand her portfolio and began working in different fashion capitals in the world like Tokyo, Shanghai, Paris, and many more.
- Tatiana has moved to New York.
- Sarah has modeled in Paris and Tokyo. (No Appearance)

It also focused on the ANTM tour featuring:

Shannon Stewart, Mercedes Scelba-Shorte, Shandi Sullivan, Catie Anderson, Ann Markley, Norelle Van Herk, Eva Marcille, Amanda Swafford, Toccara Jones, Kahlen Rondot, Brittany Brower, Tiffany Richardson, Keenyah Hill, and Naima Mora.

- Special guests: Naima Mora

== Summaries ==
=== Call-out order ===
Order	Episodes												
Order	1 (Note: In episode 1, the group of 35 semi-finalists was reduced to 14. This call-out order does not reflect their performances that week.)	2	3	4	5	6	7 (Note: In episode 7, Rebecca and Tiffany were called together as the bottom two and both were eliminated.)	8	9	10	11	13	
1	Rebecca	Tiffany	Keenyah	Brittany	Rebecca	Kahlen	Brittany	Kahlen	Kahlen	Naima	Keenyah	Naima	Naima
2	Christina	Naima	Tatiana	Keenyah	Christina	Brittany	Keenyah	Christina	Christina	Keenyah	Kahlen	Kahlen	Kahlen
3	Keenyah	Rebecca	Rebecca	Michelle	Tatiana	Naima	Naima	Naima	Naima	Kahlen	Naima	Keenyah	
4	Brita	Kahlen	Tiffany	Kahlen	Tiffany	Christina	Michelle	Keenyah	Brittany	Brittany	Brittany		
5	Naima	Christina	Lluvy	Christina	Brittany	Michelle	Kahlen	Brittany	Keenyah	Christina			
6	Noelle	Michelle	Naima	Rebecca	Keenyah	Tatiana	Christina	Michelle	Michelle				
7	Michelle	Noelle	Christina	Tatiana	Kahlen	Tiffany	Tatiana	Tatiana					
8	Sarah	Sarah	Brandy	Naima	Naima	Keenyah	Rebecca; Tiffany						
9	Brandy	Tatiana	Noelle	Tiffany	Michelle	Rebecca	Rebecca; Tiffany						
10	Brittany	Brittany	Michelle	Noelle	Lluvy	Lluvy							
11	Kahlen	Lluvy	Kahlen	Lluvy	Noelle								
12	Tatiana	Keenyah	Brittany	Brandy									
13	Lluvy	Brandy	Sarah										
14	Tiffany	Brita											

The contestant was eliminated
The contestant won the competition

=== Average call-out order ===
Casting call-out order and final two are not included

Rank by average	Place	Model	Call-out total	Number of call-outs	Call-out average
1	2	Kahlen	40	11	3.64
2	1	Naima	41	11	3.73
3	3	Keenyah	46	11	4.18
4	5	Christina	38	9	4.22
5	4	Brittany	48	10	4.80
6	8-9	Rebecca	30	6	5.00
7	8-9	Tiffany	33	6	5.50
8	7	Tatiana	41	7	5.86
9	6	Michelle	49	8	6.13
10	11	Noelle	37	4	9.25
11	10	Lluvy	47	5	9.40
12	13	Sarah	21	2	10.50
13	12	Brandy	33	3	11.00
14	14	Brita	14	1	14.00

=== Bottom two ===
Episode	Contestants	Eliminated
2	Brandy & Brita	Brita
3	Brittany & Sarah	Sarah
4	Brandy & Lluvy	Brandy
5	Lluvy & Noelle	Noelle
6	Lluvy & Rebecca	Lluvy
7	Rebecca & Tiffany	Rebecca
7	Rebecca & Tiffany	Tiffany
8	Michelle & Tatiana	Tatiana
9	Keenyah & Michelle	Michelle
10	Brittany & Christina	Christina
11	Brittany & Naima	Brittany
13	Kahlen & Keenyah	Keenyah
13	Kahlen & Naima	Kahlen

The contestant was eliminated after her first time in the bottom two
The contestant was eliminated after her second time in the bottom two
The contestant was eliminated after her third time in the bottom two
The contestant was eliminated in the final judging and placed as the runner-up

=== Photo shoot guide ===
- Episode 2 Photo Shoot: Aliens over Manhattan
- Episode 3 Photo Shoot: 1-800-Flowers dog-walkers
- Episode 4 Photo Shoot: Warneco calendar Zodiac Signs
- Episode 5 Photo Shoot: Got Milk? campaign with different ethnicities
- Episode 6 Photo Shoot: Gas attendants fighting the elements
- Episode 7 Photo Shoot: Wonderbra pillow fight with a male model
- Episode 8 Photo Shoot: 7 deadly sins
- Episode 9 Photo Shoot: Animals for Lubriderm with a crocodile
- Episode 10 Photo Shoot: Kloofing to get to shoot actual shoot was creating their own look using natural elements
- Episode 11 Photo Shoot: Dancing with African Natives for Caress Body Wash
- Episode 13 Photo Shoot & Commercial: CoverGirl Outlast Foundation ad

=== Other cast members ===
- Jay Manuel – Photo Director
- J. Alexander – Runway Coach
- Mathu Anderson – Make-Up Artist
- Danilo – Hairstylist

=== Makeovers ===
- Brita - The Princess Bride inspired tight waves
- Sarah - Peter Pan inspired cut and dyed dark brown
- Brandy - Cut short and dyed light red with bleached eyebrows
- Noelle - Blown-out and straightened
- Lluvy - Trimmed and dyed red a la Shelley Duvall
- Rebecca - Long curly brown weave with blonde highlights
- Tiffany - Long straight middle part black weave
- Tatiana - Dyed chocolate brown a la Paulina Porizkova
- Michelle - Cut shorter and dyed ice blonde
- Christina - Dyed dark brown
- Brittany - Trimmed with heavy bangs
- Keenyah - Vidal Sassoon inspired asymmetrical blunt chin-length bob; later, long wavy black weave
- Kahlen - Carmen Kass inspired long blonde weave with bangs
- Naima - Dyed honey blonde

== Criticism ==
The show was criticized for its handling of sexual assault allegations from Keenyah, who was sexually harassed by a male model on a photo shoot. The show has been criticized for not doing anything when the model stroked her inner thigh, moaned in her ear, took photos of her and harassed her repeatedly for her phone number.
