= The Look for Less =

- Presented by: Elisabeth Hasselbeck; Yoanna House
- Country of origin: United States

Original release
- Network: Style Network

The Look for Less is a television show airing on the Style Network. Previously hosted by Survivor: The Australian Outback contestant Elisabeth Hasselbeck, the current host is America's Next Top Model winner Yoanna House. House was one of twelve contestants on America's Next Top Model, Cycle Two. In most episodes, a person must shop with a fashion stylist to recreate a runway outfit with a set budget (ex: $150) in under an hour.
