= Eva Marcille =

American actress, TV host and fashion model (born 1984)

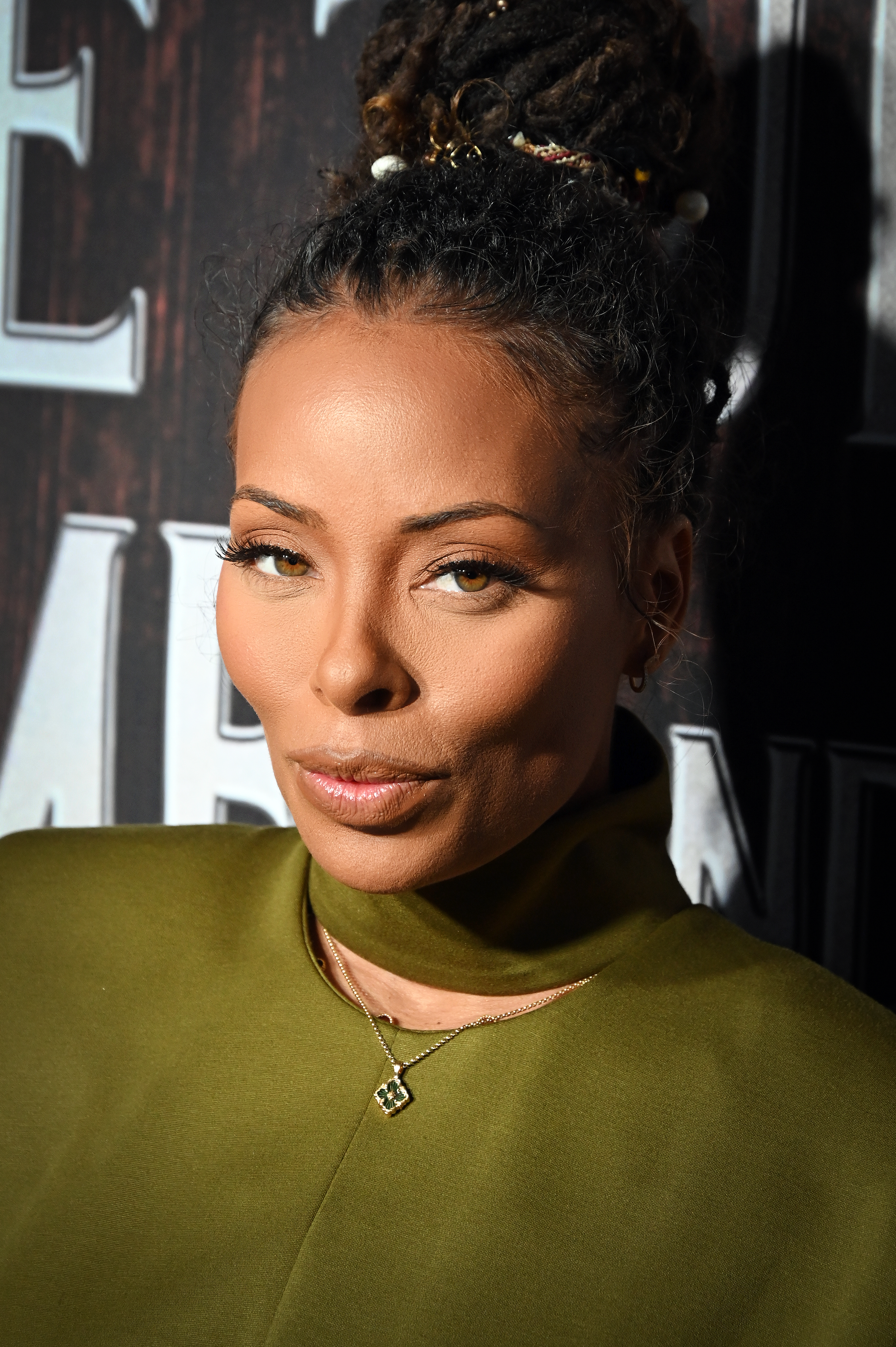
- Marcille in 2026
- Born: Eva Marcille Pigford; October 30, 1984 (age 42); Los Angeles, California, U.S.
- Other name: Eva Sterling
- Occupations: Model; actress; television personality
- Years active: 2004–present
- Spouse: Michael Sterling (m. 2018; div. 2023)
- Children: 3
- Modeling information
- Height: 5 ft 7 in (1.70 m)
- Hair color: Black
- Eye color: Hazel/Green
- Agency: L.A. Models; Ford Models, Uber-Warning Models

Eva Marcille Pigford (formerly Sterling; born October 30, 1984) is an American actress, fashion model and television personality. She rose to prominence after she won the third cycle of America's Next Top Model. Afterwards, she starred as Tracie Evans in Tyler Perry's House of Payne (2007–2012), and Tyra Hamilton on the CBS daytime soap opera The Young and the Restless (2008–2009).

Marcille later returned to reality television as a cast member on the Bravo television series The Real Housewives of Atlanta (2018–2021). She currently plays the lead role of Marilyn "Madam" DeVille in the BET+ television series All the Queen's Men (2021–present).

== Early life ==
Marcille was born in Los Angeles, California as Eva Marcille Pigford. Her middle name, Marcille, is an amalgam of her grandmothers' names "Marjorie" and "Lucille". Her parents are both African American. She attended Raymond Avenue Elementary School, Marina Del Rey Middle School, and Washington Preparatory High School (2002). She attended Clark Atlanta University in Atlanta, Georgia; however, she left the school shortly after winning the third season of America's Next Top Model at the age of 19.

== Career ==
=== Modeling ===
In 2004, Pigford became the final contestant selected for the top fourteen to compete on the UPN reality television show America's Next Top Model Cycle 3 Over her stay, Pigford received two first call-outs and won two challenges. She had two consecutive bottom two appearances where she survived both over Ann Markley and Amanda Swafford. In the end, Pigford was crowned the winner of the cycle three, beating out runner-up Yaya DaCosta, and becoming the first Black contestant to win the series. She was granted a CoverGirl cosmetics contract, a spread in Elle Magazine, and a modeling contract with Ford Models.

After eventual Cycle 17: All Stars contestant, Bre Scullark, was eliminated, Pigford appeared in the season finale of Cycle 5 alongside Cycle 4 Winner, Naima Mora to participate in the final runway show with the final two, Nik Pace and Nicole Linkletter.

Pigford appeared in a Top Models in Action segment during an episode of Cycle 12.

In February 2005, Marcille walked in New York Fashion Week for South African designer Marc Bouwer's Fall 2005 collection. In October, she walked in Los Angeles Fashion Week in the Spring 2006 collections for NAQADA and Deborah Lindquist. In March 2007, she once again walked in the Fall 2007 Los Angeles Fashion Week show, wearing Monarchy Collection.

Marcille has appeared on the covers of Women's Health and Fitness (May 2005), King (June 2005), Essence (July 2005, "The Evolution of Eva"), IONA (November 2005), Brides Noir (September 2006, "The Garden of Eva"), Black Girls Rule! (Spring 2007), Gabriel's The Magazine (May/June 2007), The Green Golf Beyond the Link (2008), Obvious (2010), Urban Lux (March/April 2011), Kontrol (Fall/Winter 2011), Sheen (January 2016, "Living Life Fearlessly), Rolling Out (January 2017), Upscale (April 2018), and The B Collective Magazine (2018).

In addition to having fashion and editorial spreads in In Touch Weekly (January 2005, "What's in, what's out"; April 2007, "In their closets"), We The Urban (May 2005) Hype Hair (June 2005; December 2016; August 2017, "Eva Marcille"), Elle (July 2005), Elle Girl (2005 editorial collaboration with DKNY Jeans), Jewel (October 2006), Essence (2007, "Eye Openers"; August 2009, "We Dare You To"), Vibe Vixen (June 2011), and Today's Black Woman (May 2014, "All About Eva"), she's modeled in advertisements and campaigns for CoverGirl, DKNY Jeans, Samsung, red by Marc Ecko, UNleashed, Apple Bottoms, Lerner, and Avon.

On November 15, 2006, Marcille left her managers Benny Medina and Tyra Banks, and officially dropped changed her name from 'Eva Pigford' to Eva Marcille (swapping her surname for her middle name). She has stated she did this in order to not use her modeling fame to get into acting but earn her acting roles.

Marcille is now signed to L.A. Models. She has been featured on America's Next Top Model: Exposed on the CW. She has also been featured as one of CoverGirl's Top Models in Action.

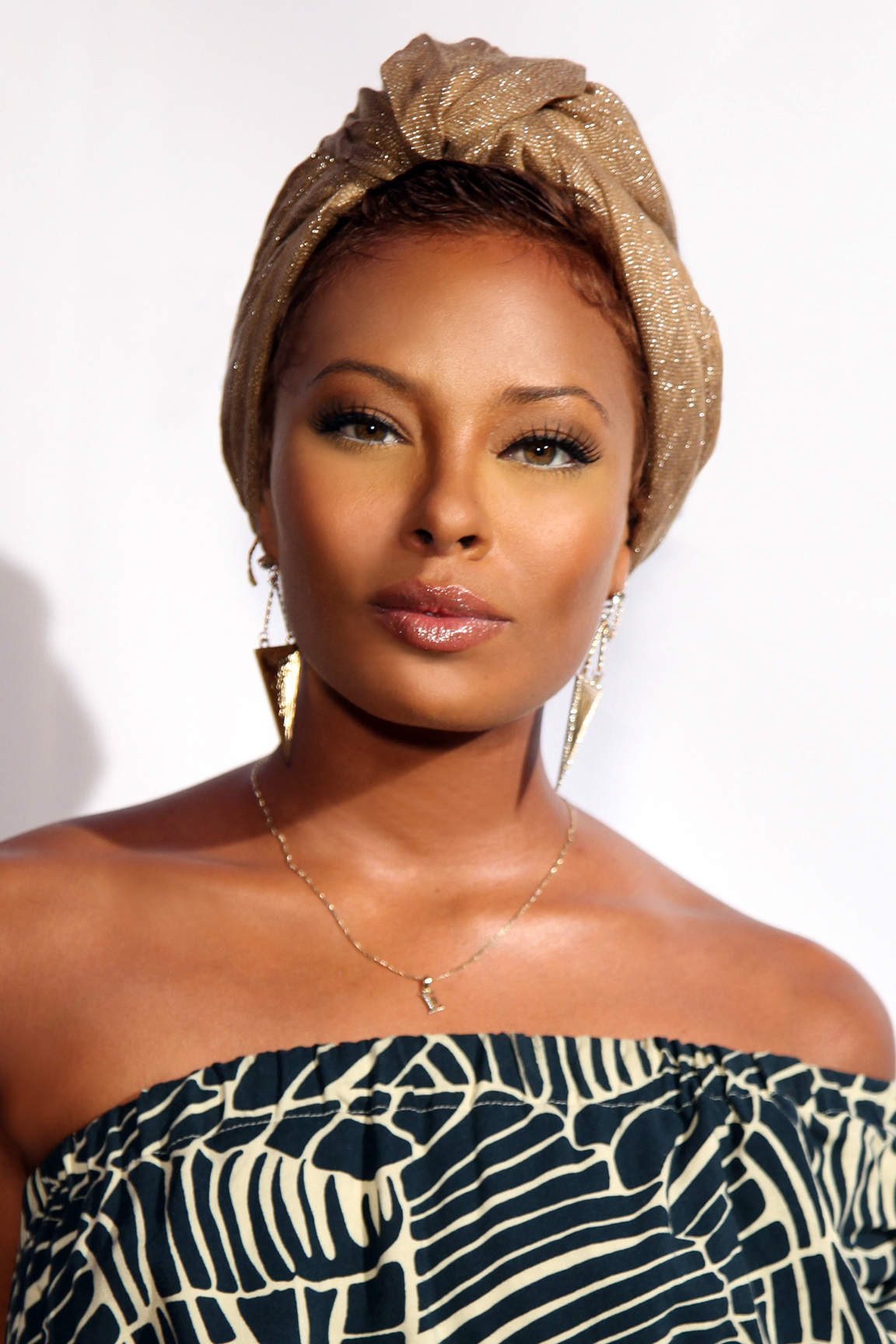
Marcille in 2012

In February 2012, Marcille walked for the Sachika Fall 2012 runway.

=== Television work ===
In 2005, Marcille guest starred in the "Cardiac Episode" and "Through the Looking Glass" episodes of the UPN legal drama series, Kevin Hill, as Sandra Clark. In August, she took part in the fifth episode of the debut season of MTV's sketch comedy, Nick Cannon Presents Wild 'N Out along with T.I.

From 2006 to 2007, she hosted the BET J reality show My Model Looks Better Than Your Model. In May 2006, she appeared in the Fox Television Studios produced, The Wedding Album, portraying the role of Gretchen, the sassy roommate of Tara Summers' character, Milla. In September, she acted as Vanessa in her first major film Crossover, where she acted alongside Anthony Mackie and Wayne Brady.

In 2007, she guest starred in two of The CW's series, her first being the comedy drama, The Game, where she played a dramatized version of herself in the "Out of Bounds" episode, and the second being the superhero series Smallville, where she played Tyler Crenshaw, a villainous beauty queen, in the episode, "Fierce". The same year, she would haves roles in the Chris Rock-led romantic comedy I Think I Love My Wife, as Hope, and the "Everybody Hates Minimum Wage" episode of Everybody Hates Chris as Ms. Crabtree.

In 2008, she joined the cast of The Young and the Restless as a young mother named Tyra Hamilton. After a few months, her character, who was planned to be temporary was made permanent, appearing in 72 episodes overall. In 2009, Marcille was nominated for two NAACP Image Awards for Outstanding Actress in a Daytime Drama Series for her Y&R role. In June 2009, she participated in the BET prank show Played by Fame, where contestants have nightmarish dates with celebrities.

Furthermore, she has appeared in several music videos, including "Baby" by Angie Stone (featuring Betty Wright), 50 Cent's "I Get Money" and Jamie Foxx's "DJ Play a Love Song".

In 2011, she hosted the second season of the Oxygen reality competition series, Hair Battle Spectacular. In August 2013, Marcille appeared in the video clip "J'accélère (I accelerate)" by French rapper Rohff. On August 5, 2015, Marcille began appearing in the TV One series Born Again Virgin as the role of Tara.

In February 2016, she was in a reality series titled About the Business. In August 2017, Marcille competed in the first season of VH1's Scared Famous, which premiered on October 23, 2017. In November, she began appearing on the Bravo reality show, The Real Housewives of Atlanta, in a recurring capacity as a friend of NeNe Leakes. The following year, she was promoted to being a full-time cast member for the eleventh season. She remained a main cast member until her departure in 2020.

In June 2021, BET+ began streaming the Tyler Perry directed drama series, All The Queen's Men, starring Marcille as Marilyn "Madam" DeVille.

== Personal life ==
In July 2006, Marcille began dating actor Lance Gross. The couple became engaged on December 24, 2008, but later broke up in March 2010. She dated rapper Flo Rida from 2010 to 2012.

In early February 2014, Marcille gave birth to her first daughter with singer Kevin McCall. She and McCall split in spring 2014, with Marcille stating she has custody of their daughter. In August 2019, she revealed that her daughter's last name had been legally changed from McCall to Sterling (surname of her then-husband, Michael Sterling).

In December 2017, Marcille became engaged to Atlanta-based attorney Michael Sterling. The two married on October 7, 2018. Together, they have two sons, born in April 2018 and September 2019. In 2019, she also founded cEVAd, a CBD oil company. The company launched during the birth of her son Maverick. In March 2023, Eva filed for divorce from Sterling. On August 3, 2023, their divorce was finalized. They began reconnecting publicly in July 2025 and have since confirmed their reconciliation with posts about being "Forever Sterlings."

== Filmography ==
=== Film ===
Year	Title	Role	Notes
2005	The Walk	Sydney Lee	Video; as Eva Pigford
2006	Premium	Farrah	as Eva Pigford
2006	Crossover	Vanessa	as Eva Pigford
2006	The Wedding Album	Gretchen	Fox Network Pilot
2007	I Think I Love My Wife	Hope	as Eva Pigford
2009	Super Capers	News Reporter	
2011	The Boys and Girls Guide to Getting Down	Jasmine	as Eva Pigford
2012	If You Really Love Me	Fraan	GMC TV Original Movie
2012	Note to Self	Karen Wells	as Eva Pigford
2013	24 Hour Love	Leah	
2014	For the Love of Lockwood	Marla Peters	TV One Original Movie
2015	For the Love of Lockwood Too	Marla Peters	TV One Original Movie
2015	Sister Code	Sheila	
2017	The Cheaters Club	Olive	
2017	Miss Me This Christmas	Trish McDonald	
2021	Adventures in Christmasing	Taylor	VH1 Original Movie
2022	Hello	Alicia Gregory	BET Original Movie
2022	A New Diva's Christmas Carol	Zero	VH1 Original Movie
2022	A Christmas Fumble	Nicole Barnes	Streaming Movie
2024	Buried Alive & Survived	Alicia	Lifetime Original Movie
2025	Noah's Arc: The Movie	Marley	Streaming Movie
2026	Pushed off a Plane and Survived	Jaynie	Lifetime Original Movie

=== Television ===
Year	Title	Role	Notes
2004	America's Next Top Model	Herself/Contestant	Cycle 3 Winner
2005	Best Week Ever	Herself	Episode: "Michael Jackson trial, the OC and More"
2005	Wild 'n Out	Herself	2 episodes
2005	Kevin Hill	Sandra Clark	2 episodes; as Eva Pigford
2007	The Hills	Herself	Episode: "When You Least Expect It"
2007	The Game	Eva Marcille	Episode: "Out of Bounds"
2007	Smallville	Tyler Crenshaw	Episode: "Fierce"
2007	Everybody Hates Chris	Ms. Crabtree	Episode: "Everybody Hates Minimum Wage"
2007–2012	Tyler Perry's House of Payne	Tracie Evans	Recurring cast: Seasons 1–2, 5–7 & 10
2008–2009	The Young and the Restless	Tyra Hamilton	Regular role
2009	The Assistants	Alicia James	Episode: "The Break Up"
2011	Let's Stay Together	Raynelle	Episode: "Your Arm's Too Short to Box with Grandparents"; as Eva Pigford
2012	Girlfriend Confidential: LA	Herself	Main cast
2013–2015	Real Husbands of Hollywood	Eva Marcille	4 episodes
2015–2016	Born Again Virgin	Tara	Main cast
2017	Scared Famous	Herself/Contestant	Main cast
2018–2021	The Real Housewives of Atlanta	Herself	Recurring cast: Season 10; Main cast: Seasons 11–12; Guest: Season 13
2021–present	All the Queen's Men	Marilyn 'Madam' DeVille	Lead role
2022–2024	The Real Housewives Ultimate Girls Trip	Herself	Main cast: Seasons 2 & 5
2025	Special Forces: World's Toughest Test	Herself	Contestant: Season 4 (2 episodes)

=== Music Videos ===
Year	Song	Artist
2006	"DJ Play a Love Song"	Jamie Foxx
2012	"Best of Me"	Tyrese
2013	"Live It Up"	Jennifer Lopez
2013	"J'accélère"	Rohff

Preceded by Yoanna House	America's Next Top Model winner Cycle 3 (2004)	Succeeded by Naima Mora
