= Yoanna House =

American model

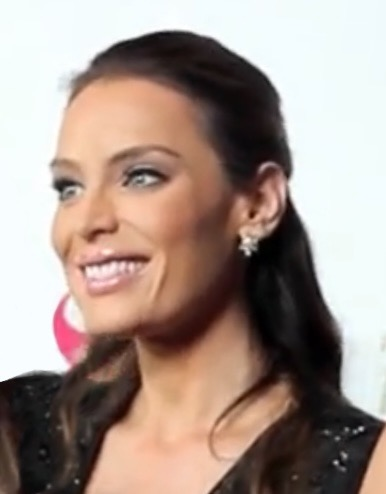
- House in 2015
- Born: April 9, 1980 (age 46); Jacksonville, Florida, U.S.
- Children: 1 son
- Modeling information
- Height: 5 ft 11 in (1.80 m)
- Hair color: Brown
- Eye color: Sea Green
- Agency: IMG Models; 1st Opinion Model Management, Wilhelmina Models

Yoanna House (born April 9, 1980) is an American fashion model and television host, best known as the winner of Cycle 2 of America's Next Top Model.

== Biography ==
House was born and raised in Jacksonville, Florida. House's father, a medical doctor, is from Canada and her mother is from Mexico. From early childhood, House showed great interest in fashion, which she claims was spurred by her grandmother, saying:

I was always in her closet. We would watch TV, read magazines, go to the mall. She taught me about couture and how important it was. A lot of my appreciation came from her.

After graduating from Bishop Kenny High School in 1998, House attended the University of North Florida, majoring in international relations and Asian studies. House speaks fluent Japanese as well as Spanish (which she spoke from a young age). Around this time, House also began to pursue a career in fashion modeling, but claimed she found her options limited because she was overweight. She says she eventually lost 45 pounds after changing her diet and adopting an exercise plan.

She lives in Jacksonville with her son.

== Career ==
House was the winner of Cycle 2 of America's Next Top Model. After Top Model, she signed with IMG Models. House made her debut as a runway model at the Mercedes-Benz Fashion Week in 2004, walking for fashion designers Petro Zillia, Custo Barcelona, Sue Wong, and John Sakalis. She took part in a promotional runway show for America's Next Top Model Obsessed which premiered on Oxygen. Her most visible modeling assignments immediately after her win include a commercial for the Declare Yourself voting campaign, a cover story for Psychology Today magazine., spread in Hannah Anderson, Jane, Look for Less Ads, Metro Style, Careline, Jacksonville magazine (cover and spread), and Sue Wong (2005 line). She became host of The Look for Less in 2005, replacing Elisabeth Hasselbeck.

The following year, she was named "the face" of The CW network and appeared in commercials and web advertisements for the fledgling network. In overseas projects, she signed with Danish modeling agency 1st Opinion Model Management and won a contract with Careline, an Israeli cosmetics company. She appeared in a commercial for make-up brand Sheer Cover, Leeza Gibbons's make-up line, along with Cycle 4 winner of America's Next Top Model Naima Mora.

In the summer of 2008, House hosted The N's reality series Queen Bees, which attempts to reform mean girls. She filmed a PSA for Declare Yourself, parodying a lipstick commercial.

Preceded by Adrianne Curry	America's Next Top Model winner Cycle 2 (2004)	Succeeded by Eva Pigford
