= Taylor Bills =

American basketball player

Taylor Bills (born Stephen Taylor Bills, 2 January 1985) is an American ex-baseball player and reality star. He played for the Arizona League Mariners and is also known for winning ABC's reality show True Beauty.

== Early life ==
Bills grew up Mormon in Irvine, California. He is the eldest of six children.

== Baseball career ==
Bills was mainly a pitcher for the Arizona League, Mariners. He played during 2007 at age 22. He was released after being promoted to Triple A.

== True Beauty ==
Bills competed on ABC's reality show True Beauty created by Tyra Banks, a show that secretly tests how truly beautiful a group of 10 people are inside. Bills was criticized for his temper but was praised for his kindness to others, and excelling in the challenge. He passed all hidden beauty tests but two. He won two challenges and was in the bottom two once. Bills ultimately made it to the final three with Erika Othen, and Craig Franczyk. The judges felt that Bills was truly beautiful and would go out of his way to help others and still managed to excel in the challenges choosing him as the season 2 winner of True Beauty. He won $100,000. His picture and a small article were in People Magazine's 100 Most Beautiful People Edition. True Beauty (season 2)
