= Mercedes Scelba-Shorte =

American actress

- Born: Mercedes Yvette Scelba-Shorte; August 24, 1981 (age 45); New Jersey, U.S.
- Modeling information
- Height: 5 ft 9 in (1.75 m)
- Hair color: Brown
- Eye color: Brown
- Agency: Nous Model Management; Elite Model Management; Click Models; Chick Models; Brand Model & Talent

Mercedes Yvette Scelba-Shorte, also known as Mercedes Yvette (born August 24, 1981, in New Jersey), is an American fashion model and actress. She was a contestant on Cycle 2 of America's Next Top Model. During the show, Scelba-Shorte revealed that she has lupus, an autoimmune disease.

== Before Top Model ==
Scelba-Shorte was studying at California State University, Northridge before auditioning for America's Next Top Model. She was eventually chosen as one of the 12 contestants on Cycle 2 of America's Next Top Model, which aired in 2004. In 2000, she also appeared in the MTV reality show Fear.

== Modeling and acting career ==
On Cycle 2 of America's Next Top Model, Scelba-Shorte received two 'first call outs' and won one challenge, eventually runner-up. While on the show, one of her concerns was about telling her competitors that she had lupus.

After appearing on America's Next Top Model, Scelba-Shorte became a spokesperson for the Lupus Foundation of America. She signed with Nous Model Management and has also landed small roles in a number of TV shows including One on One, All of Us, and The Bold and the Beautiful. She also changed her name to Mercedes Yvette.

She has appeared on the cover of Wedding Dresses magazine in 2005, Lupus Now magazine (Fall 2004 and Fall 2007), and Arthritis Today. She has also graced the pages of Teen Vogue. Her commercial credits include Chili's, MedermaTarget, Hewlett-Packard, Sears, AT&T, Payless Shoes, Bell South, and Chevy. Other modeling credits include Anchor Blue, Kohl's, Old Navy, Wal-Mart, Halston, Mervyn's, Target, and Macy's. Her runway credits include: DSquared2 Milan Fashion Show Spring 2004, Rock & Republic, Studios John Sakalis Fall 2004 and Ellegirl presents Dare To Be You: Wal-Mart Meets America's Next Top Models 2005. Scelba-Shorte was also in a commercial for Chili's restaurant in 2007 and was featured in the Kay's catalog for Holiday 2007. She can be found modeling Mandy Moore's Mblem line and landed her first beauty campaign for Leeza Gibbons' Sheer Cover Mineral Makeup. Scelba-Shorte was featured in the VisitCalifornia.com "Misconceptions" 2010 commercial alongside Jason Mraz, Kim Kardashian, Betty White, and the Jonas Brothers.

Scelba-Shorte left Nous Model Management in Los Angeles in 2008. She then signed to Elite Model Management, L.A, and now is signed to Industry Model Group under the name of Mercedes Yvette.
