= Dooney & Bourke =

American fashion company

Dooney & Bourke, Inc.
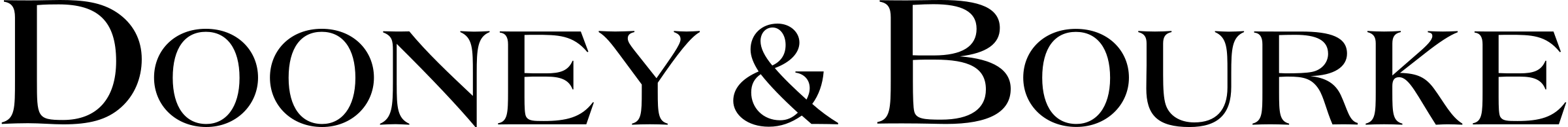

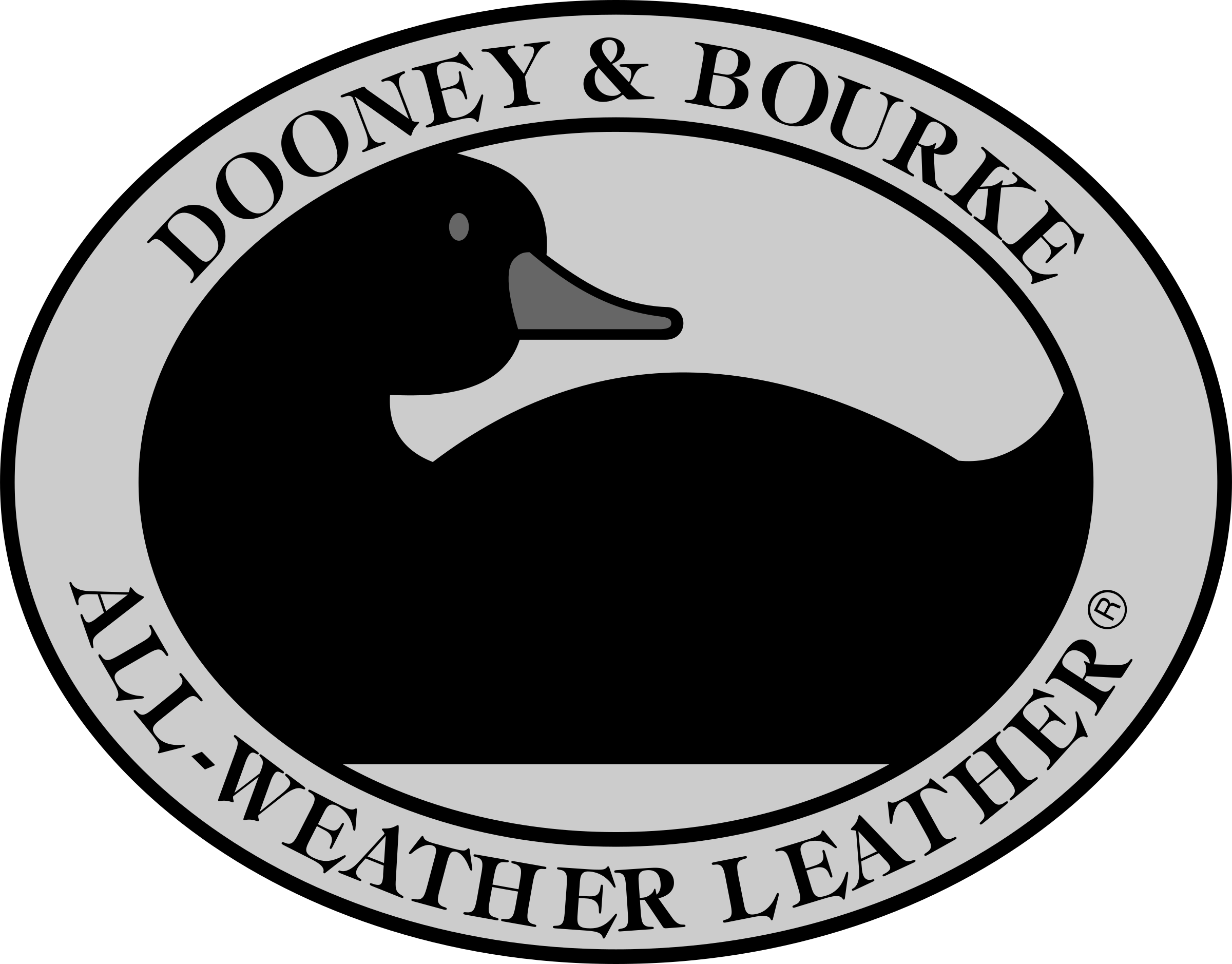
- Type: Private
- Industry: Fashion
- Founded: 1975; 51 years ago in Norwalk, Connecticut, U.S.
- Founder: Peter Dooney; Frederic Bourke
- Headquarters: 1 Regent St., Norwalk, Connecticut 06855 USA; 41.106248°N 73.3993482°W
- Key people: Peter Dooney (CEO, President, Chief Designer); Rico Trevino (Executive Vice President); Benjamin Hill (Vice President); Jolanta Bershefsky (Art Director)
- Products: Handbags; accessories; footwear
- Website: dooney.com

Dooney & Bourke is an American leather goods brand founded in 1975 by designer Peter Dooney and entrepreneur Frederic Bourke in Norwalk, Connecticut. Originally a men's supplier of belts, suspenders, and ties, the company now specializes in handbags and small accessories. Peter Dooney has maintained his role as designer at the company throughout the brand's history. Dooney's competitors include Coach and Kate Spade.

== History ==
Dooney & Bourke ("Dooney") started in 1975 when Peter Dooney and Frederic Bourke launched their namesake in Norwalk, Connecticut. Dooney was CEO of manufacturing and marketing, while Bourke served as principal finance and investment officer.

The duo started with men's leather belts and suspenders (handmade by Peter Dooney), inspired by military gear, mail pouches and saddlebags. Dooney & Bourke debuted its first women's handbags with their 1981 launch of the "All-Weather Leather" collection, featuring pebble-textured leather, smooth leather trim, and a tongue-and-loop closure.

Dooney's merchandise is distributed in Dillard's and Macy's, as well as Dooney's own store in Norwalk, Connecticut. In 2006, the Emma Bag, a small oval-shaped bag named after Emma Roberts, was created. In 2007, actress Hayden Panettiere created a line of bags for Dooney, including the Hayden bag and the Chiara, a patent leather bag.

== Legal issues ==
Louis Vuitton Malletier v. Dooney & Bourke, Inc.

In April 2004, Louis Vuitton filed a suit against Dooney & Bourke, claiming Dooney had infringed its Murakami Monogram Multicolore collection. On May 30, 2008, District Court Judge Shira Scheindlin ruled in favor of Dooney & Bourke and dismissed the case.

Conspiracy and bribery conviction of Bourke

On July 9, 2009, Frederic Bourke was found guilty by a jury and convicted of conspiracy and bribery under the Foreign Corrupt Practices Act and Travel Act in the Southern District of New York. Bourke was convicted of conspiring with Czech national, Viktor Kožený, known as "Pirate of Prague," to pay bribes to the ex-president and government officials of Azerbaijan. The bribery involved a 1998 scheme including the sale and purchase of the Azeri state oil company.

Although Bourke did not personally bribe the government officials and lost his $8 million investment in a hedge fund managed by Kožený, Bourke was found to have known that money invested in the fund was used for bribing Azeri officials with cash and a secret two-thirds interest in the oil company. After the jury verdict, Bourke was fined $1 million and sentenced to one year in prison, followed by three years of probation.

== Gallery ==
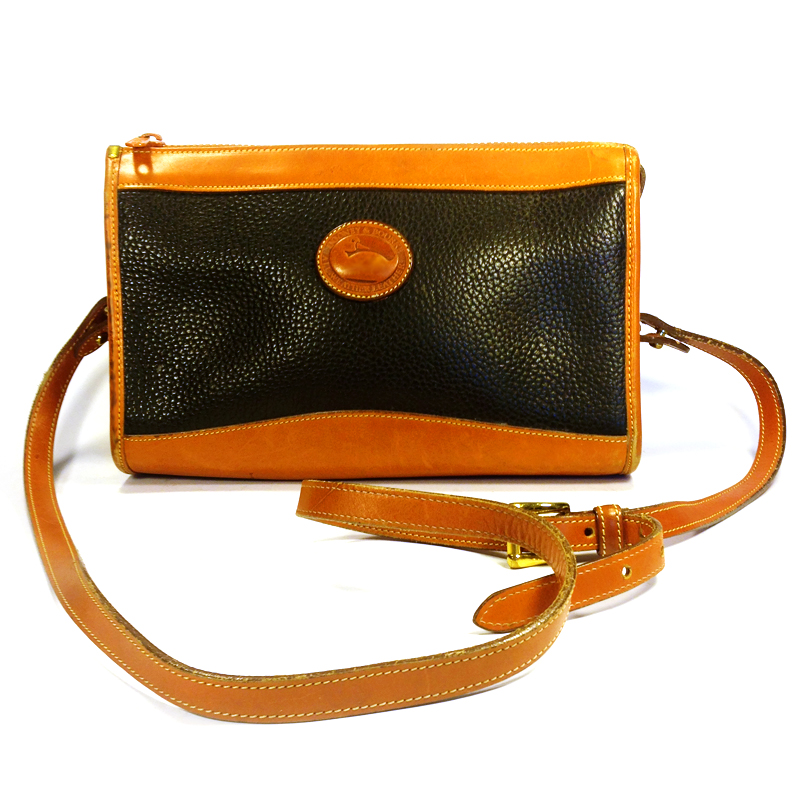
Dooney & Bourke All-Weather Leather handbag

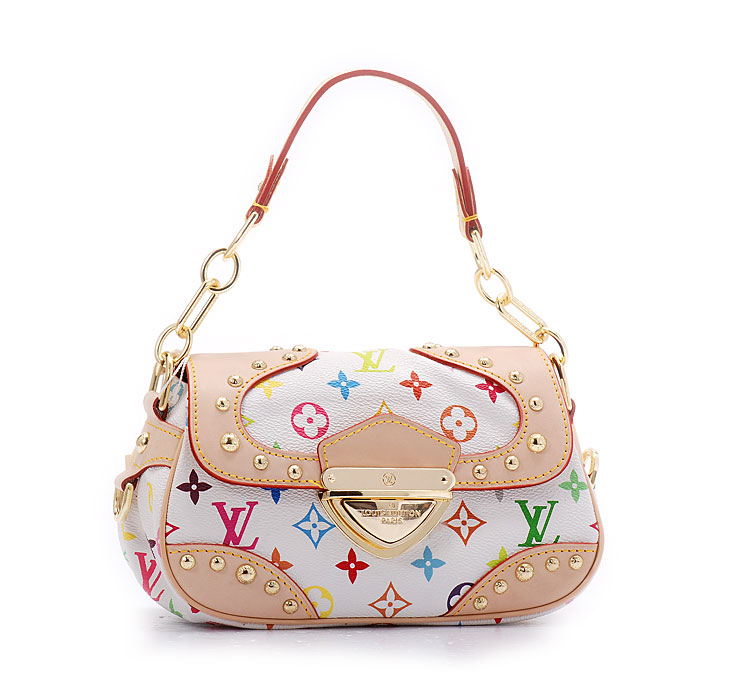
A handbag from Louis Vuitton's Murakami Monogram Multicolore collection

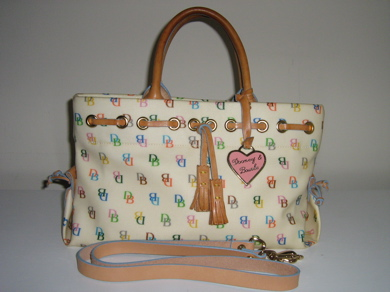
Dooney & Bourke multicolored monogram handbag
