= America's Next Top Model season 2 =

America's Next Top Model
- Season 2
- Judges: Tyra Banks; Janice Dickinson; Nigel Barker; Eric Nicholson
- No. of contestants: 12
- Winner: Yoanna House
- No. of episodes: 11

Release
- Original network: UPN
- Original release: January 13 – March 23, 2004

Additional information
- Filming dates: September 8 – October 15, 2003

Season chronology
- ← Previous; Season 1 Next → Season 3

The second cycle of America's Next Top Model premiered on January 13, 2004, and was hosted by model Tyra Banks. The show aimed to find the next top fashion model. The cycle's catchphrase was "They're all gorgeous, but only one has what it takes."

The prizes for this cycle were a contract with IMG Models, a fashion spread and a cover in Jane magazine, and a cosmetics campaign with Sephora.

This was the only season to feature a cast of twelve contestants, as well as the only season prior to cycle 16 not to include a casting episode. The international destination for the cycle was Milan, Italy, marking the show's first visit to Southern Europe and the first of three visits to Italy.

The winner was 23-year-old Yoanna House from Jacksonville, Florida, then Mercedes Scelba-Shorte been the runner-up. This was the first cycle to feature Nigel Barker as a judge and the only season to feature Eric Nicholson as a judge.

== Contestants ==
Name	Age	Height	Hometown	Outcome	Place
Anna Bradfield	24	5 ft 8.5 in (1.74 m)	LaGrange, Georgia	Episode 1	12
Bethany Harrison	22	5 ft 8 in (1.73 m)	Houston, Texas	Episode 2	11
Heather Blumberg	18	5 ft 10 in (1.78 m)	Moreno Valley, California	Episode 3	10
Jenascia Chakos	21	5 ft 7 in (1.70 m)	Burien, Washington	Episode 4	9
Xiomara Frans	25	5 ft 11.5 in (1.82 m)	Morganville, New Jersey	Episode 5	8
Catie Anderson	18	5 ft 10 in (1.78 m)	Willmar, Minnesota	Episode 6	7
Sara Racey-Tabrizi	22	5 ft 9 in (1.75 m)	Seattle, Washington	Episode 7	6
Camille McDonald	25	5 ft 9.5 in (1.77 m)	Mamaroneck, New York	Episode 8	5
April Wilkner	23	5 ft 9 in (1.75 m)	Providence, Rhode Island	Episode 10	4
Shandi Sullivan	21	5 ft 11 in (1.80 m)	Kansas City, Missouri	Episode 11	3
Mercedes Scelba-Shorte	22	5 ft 8 in (1.73 m)	Valencia, California	Episode 11	2
Yoanna House	23	5 ft 11 in (1.80 m)	Jacksonville, Florida	Episode 11	1

== Episodes ==
No. overall	No. in season	Title	Original release date	US viewers (millions)
10	1	"The Girl Who Overslept"	January 13, 2004	4.90
The top twelve contestants were picked up on a bus in New York City where they met each other and started sizing up the competition. They were surprised to find themselves showing up on a U.S. Navy ship, where they met Tyra and found out this is where they had their first runway show. Tyra commented, "They really didn't know what they were doing." The first photo shoot was a Garden of Eden-themed nude shoot for Fresh Look contact lenses, in which the women portraying as Eve with 12 different cultures, wore only sequins and body paint. One contestant, Anna, decided not to participate because, she said, it would insult her husband and child back home. Another, Jenascia overslept and arrived late for the shoot, despite other contestants promises to wake the contestants when needed. At panel, Camille, Mercedes, April, Sara, Heather and Shandi had pictures that stunned the judges, Yoanna's classic face was revered, and Bethany's bust was identified as a problem. Anna and Jenascia ended up in the bottom two. Though the judges were put off by Jenascia's tardiness, they ultimately chose to send home Anna, the plus-sized contestant of the cycle, for refusing to do the photo shoot, and questionable desire and willpower.: Featured photographer: Nigel Barker; Special guests: Ed Libby, Jim De Yonker, Mike Randy, Ian Jones, and Yohanea Cepeda
11	2	"The Girl Who Floats Like a Butterfly and Stings Like a Bee"	January 20, 2004	4.93
The top eleven contestants received runway training from J. Alexander. At the subsequent walking challenge, Catie's gracefulness won her a trip to Carmen Marc Valvo's cocktail party, and she chose Mercedes and Camille to go with her. At the photo shoot, the top eleven contestants were required to style themselves using Steve Madden 90210 shoes, before they picked their own best shot for the week. While Catie, Camille, Yoanna, Mercedes, Sara and April did well, Bethany, Heather, and Jenascia struggled with selling the shoes. Despite Shandi's lack of confidence and terrible runway walk, Bethany was cut, because the judges felt that she didn't know how to pose to flatter her large bust.: Featured photographer: Ché Graham; Special guests: Martin Snow, Maggie Rizer, and Carmen Marc Valvo
12	3	"The Girl Who Can Cry at the Drop of a Hat"	January 27, 2004	7.11
The top ten contestants got their makeovers, and some were more happy than others. For example, Catie cried because she didn't like her short hair and said she looked like a boy. Jenascia complained about the fact that she looked tall with short hair and Heather didn't like the fact that she would be more blonde because she didn't change after all. Afterwards, Jay Manuel tested their make-up skills by giving the contestants 15 minutes to apply make-up with one mirror, set of brushes, and palette between them. The winner, Yoanna, got a dinner with 3 friends (Sara, Xiomara, and April), while the rest of the contestants shopped for, prepared, and served the dinner. After the challenge, Shandi, who had complained about the heat of the room, collapsed due to exhaustion, causing the other contestants to exert concern and aid in order to remedy the situation. She turned out fine, however, and vowed to make time for sleep and to eat as much as she could to prevent it from happening again. For the photoshoot, the contestants were suspended over a giant hole in a building wearing Laundry by Shelli Segal. Catie struggled because she feared falling to her death, but went through with 12 frames beautifully. In judging, Shandi wowed the judges with her immense improvement. April, Yoanna and Mercedes once again did well, and Sara finally showed she was more than just a pretty contestant. Xiomara and Heather were in the bottom two, both for their unsatisfactory photos. Xiomara was admonished for being distracted during her shoot and letting Jay concentrate on Catie's fear of heights instead of her, but it was Heather who was sent home for her lack of versatility and experience, and coming across too mall-contestant.: Featured photographer: Richard Dean; Special guests: Edward Tricomi, Joel Warren, Karima Casteneda, Julie Redfern, Mike Sharits, Mike Randi, Eric Niemand, and Halle Bowman
13	4	"The Girl Who Needs Six Months of Modeling School"	February 3, 2004	6.96
Camille's personality began to raise issues as she was singled out during a work-out session where she and April were competing in a last man standing boxing challenge, which April ended up winning. The contestants' personal style was then critiqued by Tyra and Simon Doonan, who stated that Catie's look was whore-ish. Catie started crying and arguing with Simon, saying he called her a whore, which he didn't and it showed that the rest of the contestants were sick of her acting. The contestants met Betsey Johnson and were challenged to dress in their personal style, but were only allowed to use everyone else's clothes, not their own. Camille asked Xiomara to borrow some earrings for the show, but decided against using them, putting them on the counter which resulted in the earrings being broken. Camille said that she would get them fixed by her friend, who was a jewelry designer. Betsey Johnson said Jenascia needed six months of modeling school in order to be right for her show, which is what the episode was named after. She told Catie that she still needed to find what style she had and who she was in order to do it correctly. She said Shandi's strength was that she was not a sexpot and that she shouldn't try to be that and chose her as the winner. The winner, Shandi, got dinner at JL with previous cycle's winner, Adrianne Curry and picked Yoanna and Xiomara to join her. The episode also focused on the fact that Mercedes had lupus and that she was scared because of her new medication making her hair fall out. She didn't want to tell the rest of the contestants because she said she didn't need the sympathy. She vowed to make it to the top, despite what was going on with her health and to push through. For the photo shoot, the contestants portrayed celebrities. Xiomara was upset that she had to become a darker color to portray Grace Jones, and Mercedes used the pain of her lupus to portray Billie Holiday's pain. Mercedes used her lupus to her advantage, giving an emotional shot. Xiomara gave her strongest shot to date, and Yoanna proved she could be commercial, on a high fashion level. Camille's photo was highly praised, but her attitude came across as a major problem. Catie's photo had mixed reviews and Betsey Johnson had doubts whether she is strong enough to compete in the dog-eat-dog world of modelling. Sara, Shandi & April's photo's all received praise but Jenascia received lukewarm criticism. In the end, it was Catie and Jenascia that were in the bottom two. Jenascia was eliminated because she couldn't compensate for her lack of height with stunning photographs or a personality that stood out in front of the judges.: Featured photographer: Andrew Eccles; Special guests: Simon Doonan, Adrianne Curry, Martin Snow, Danilo, Michael Carl, and Betsey Johnson
14	5	"The Girl Who is a Visual Orgasm"	February 10, 2004	7.13
The contestants underwent personality coaching. Shandi broke down after revealing her family treated her like the black sheep and a psychic did a reading for all the contestants. This week's reward challenge was a tricky interview with Janice Dickinson. Mercedes won the reward, a shopping spree, for answering the questions best and revealing her condition, lupus, which she had kept secret until then. She took Sara. Also as part of their reward, Mercedes', Sara's, and Tyra's moms all showed up. The contestants posed underwater for Quench Water. April gave the best photo of the cycle yet, but she came across too uptight in judging. Sara also did well, proving she could be both strong and soft in a photo. Shandi and Camille struggled, but not as much as Xiomara, who Nole said looked like a "walrus wearing chiffon". This sent her home as Camille's photo was much better, despite her bad attitude and dominatrix tendencies.: Featured photographer: George Holz; Special guests: Sam Christensen, Suzannah Galland, Carolyn London, and Nolé Marin
15	6	"The Girl Whose Lip Puffed Up"	February 17, 2004	6.41
The photos for the week were simple black and white beauty shots that focused on their faces. Camille was late to the acting class because she went to see a doctor for her puffed up lip, which had swollen due to an allergic reaction. The contestants then participated in an acting challenge with Mark Collier. Camille decided not to follow the script and instead, she rewrote parts of the script. Camille was then called clueless by the coach who also criticized Catie for her unconvincing acting. April won the challenge, with Shandi finishing second. The last stop was a Matrix-themed commercial for Rollitos chips. April was hailed for her performance in the commercial and photo shoot, while Camille and Catie fell flat in both areas. Yoanna gave a shot that showed off her bone structure beautifully, and both Mercedes and Shandi showed off their beauty in their photos. Sara came across as pretty, but almost a bit too sexy in her photo. But, it was Camille and Catie in the bottom 2. Camille was criticized for her attitude once again but was ultimately saved, marking the first time a contestant had survived a consecutive Bottom two appearance and Catie was sent home as the judges felt that she was not emotionally prepared enough to handle the modelling industry.: Featured photographer: Bill Heuberger; Featured commercial director: James Gay; Special guests: Tasha Smith-Arqese, Mark Collier, De La Guarda, Eric Niemand, and Kyle Hagler
16	7	"The Girl Who is Dripping With Hypocrisy"	February 24, 2004	7.64
The contestants celebrated Sara's birthday, and Sara disclosed her passion for modeling, stating that she wanted it the most. The models then practiced dancing. April stepped it up for Tony Michaels and won the challenge. She took Shandi and Sara to a party with male guests. Shandi acted flirty and fun with the male guests and was called on it by her boyfriend. They previously had an argument because he wanted to go to the movies with a friend of his who happened to be a girl named Lauren. Instead of a photo shoot, the contestants performed in Tyra's music video for "Shake Ya Body". During the shoot, April nearly pushed Yoanna off the runway, while walking on the wrong side. Shandi performed the best in her solo, Mercedes forgot the choreography and Yoanna messed up again and fell. Yoanna was in the bottom two for her poor performance in the video, but a teary-eyed Tyra sent home Sara, who the panel felt was too pin-up and sexy for the fashion world. Sara became extremely emotional as soon as Yoanna was called. The episode was followed by the premiere of the video.: Featured director: Kennedy; Special guests: Rodney Jerkins and Tony Michaels
17	8	"The Girl With a Signature Walk"	March 2, 2004	6.58
The top five contestants were taken to a restaurant where Tyra introduced their international destination for the cycle, Milan, Italy. The contestants then went on go-sees where Shandi was described as the best high fashion model, Mercedes as being a bit commercial, April as photographing well but weak in other areas, and Yoanna having to work on her body. Camille won the challenge for her strong presence. At dinner in front of Tyra, Camille implied that Yoanna had an eating disorder which was not true. The contestants did a high fashion shoot for Solstice sunglasses featuring designs by Dior, Max Mara, Burberry, Gucci & Giorgio Armani. April had mixed reviews, Camille looked pigeon-toed and was the photographer's least favorite, Mercedes looked commercial, Yoanna hid her body well and Shandi took some of the photographer's best shots all year. She was also praised for her response to rather harsh designers (which turned out to be actors testing the models' attitudes) when asked why she should get booked. Shandi simply responded that if the designers would look at her photos they would possibly see something special there. Camille got the worst review, giving off an attitude that "she knew it all". While she was walking for the designers, they asked her why she walked the way she did, and Camille replied, "This is my signature walk, and it's the walk that's going to make me famous." Mercedes was in the bottom two for looking commercial and for a lack of editorial potential, but it was Camille who was eliminated because of her attitude and getting very defensive all the time when critiqued. Camille is the first girl in the show's history to have at least three bottom two appearances in the same cycle. (Note: Camille would compete for the second time as an All-Stars contestant on the seventeenth Cycle alongside thirteen other former participants who had not won their original Top Model Cycles.): Special guests: Kyle Hagler, David Brown, Elena Cimarosti, Carlo De Amici, Kesia Elwin, Liliana Rolando, Nolé Marin, and Michael Giannini; Featured photographer: Massimo Costoli
18	9	"The Girl Who is Afraid of Snakes"	March 9, 2004	5.66
This episode was an overview of the past eight episodes of the cycle which featured previously unseen footage. It was so named because April was afraid when it was implied that they might have to handle such creatures in a photoshoot. Also seen in this episode was a discussion between Jay Manuel and Janice Dickinson, about Heather's Laundry photo.
19	10	"The Girl Who Cheated"	March 16, 2004	5.69
Male models were invited to come over to the house and had fun with the contestants, where Shandi, who was blackout drunk, ended up having sex with another male model. Lambasted by a sense of guilt, she called her boyfriend, Eric, the next day and told him what happened. Eric got mad and yelled at her before he finally hung up. The next day, Shandi called him back and he wished her good luck in the next photo shoot. This week, the contestants learned how to complement their body with their attire. Then, they were put into the test where they shopped at a flea market and found an outfit that was high fashion and complemented their body the best. Shandi was chosen as the winner and picked Yoanna to join in her reward. For this week's photo shoot, the girls teamed up to do a sensual, romantic nude shoot. At panel, Mercedes impressed the judges at the judging challenge with her ability to make a piece of cloth look like a high fashion shirt and for her strong editorial picture. April was criticized for trying to take control of the photo shoot and Mercedes was criticized for looking too commercial. In the end, April was sent home for being too technical.: Featured photographers: Almicare Incalza and Alex Martinengo; Special guests: Jean Luc, Nolé Marin, Loris Rocchi, and Stephen Fairchild
20	11	"The Girl Who is America's Next Top Model"	March 23, 2004	5.89
For the final photo, the top three had a beauty shot for which they were dressed in the opposite of their normal styles. At judging, Mercedes was hailed for finally looking like a high-fashion model. Yoanna's photo received praise, but the judges wondered if her body was right for the modeling industry. Shandi gave a pretty photo, but wasn't up to par with the other two. This eliminated her, despite giving some of the best photos in the competition.: Featured photographer: Massimo Costoli; After the shoot, the remaining two met up with Dean and Dan of DSquared² for whom they walked in a fashion show. During the show, Yoanna broke her high heels and had to use Mercedes' heel, but was able to successfully complete the show. At panel, the judges were immensely impressed by Mercedes and they felt that she stole the runway show. Tyra recognized the uniqueness of Yoanna's face, and believed that Yoanna knew the modeling industry better than Mercedes. After a long and hard deliberation, both finalists were called in and Yoanna was declared the second winner of America's Next Top Model.: Special guests: Nolé Marin, Gian Luca Guaitoli, Dean Caten, and Dan Caten

== Reception ==
Before the cycle aired, promotional footage showing the judges reacting to Ann Ward's waist drew criticism over the show's portrayal of thinness. Tyra Banks said that she had not reviewed the clip before its release and apologized for the confusion and disappointment it caused, stating that the program had not intended to promote an unhealthy body image.

== Summaries ==
=== Call-out order ===
Order	Episodes										
Order	1 (Note: In episode 1, Anna refused to participate in the shoot.)	2	3	4	5	6	7	8	10	11	
1	Camille	Catie	Shandi	Mercedes	Sara	April	Shandi	Shandi	Yoanna	Mercedes	Yoanna
2	Shandi	Yoanna	April	Xiomara	Mercedes	Yoanna	Mercedes	Yoanna	Shandi	Yoanna	Mercedes
3	April	Camille	Yoanna	Shandi	April	Mercedes	Camille	April	Mercedes	Shandi	
4	Mercedes	April	Mercedes	Yoanna	Yoanna	Shandi	April	Mercedes	April		
5	Catie	Mercedes	Sara	Sara	Catie	Sara	Yoanna	Camille			
6	Sara	Sara	Camille	April	Shandi	Camille	Sara				
7	Heather	Xiomara	Jenascia	Camille	Camille	Catie					
8	Yoanna	Heather	Catie	Catie	Xiomara						
9	Bethany	Jenascia	Xiomara	Jenascia							
10	Xiomara	Shandi	Heather								
11	Jenascia	Bethany									
12	Anna										

The contestant was eliminated
The contestant won the competition

=== Average call-out order ===
Final two is not included.

Rank by average	Place	Model	Call-out total	Number of call-outs	Call-out average
1	2	Mercedes	29	10	2.90
2–3	1	Yoanna	33	10	3.30
2–3	3	Shandi	33	10	3.30
4	4	April	30	9	3.33
5	5	Camille	38	8	4.75
6	6	Sara	34	7	4.86
7	7	Catie	34	6	5.67
8	8	Xiomara	36	5	7.20
9	10	Heather	25	3	8.33
10	9	Jenascia	36	4	9.00
11	11	Bethany	20	2	10.00
12	12	Anna	12	1	12.00

=== Bottom two ===
Episode	Contestants			Eliminated
1	Anna	&	Jenascia	Anna
2	Bethany	&	Shandi	Bethany
3	Heather	&	Xiomara	Heather
4	Catie	&	Jenascia	Jenascia
5	Camille	&	Xiomara	Xiomara
6	Camille	&	Catie	Catie
7	Sara	&	Yoanna	Sara
8	Camille	&	Mercedes	Camille
10	April	&	Mercedes	April
11	Shandi	&	Yoanna	Shandi
11	Mercedes	&	Yoanna	Mercedes

The contestant was eliminated after her first time in the bottom two
The contestant was eliminated after her second time in the bottom two
The contestant was eliminated after her third time in the bottom two
The contestant was eliminated in the final judging and placed as the runner-up

=== Photo shoot guide ===
- Episode 1 photo shoot: Adam and Eve with sequins and paint
- Episode 2 photo shoot: Steve Madden shoes
- Episode 3 photo shoot: Laundry by Shelli Segal suspended over a giant hole
- Episode 4 photo shoot: Portraying celebrity icons
- Episode 5 photo shoot: Quench underwater nymphs
- Episode 6 commercial: Rollitos chips commercial and black and white beauty shots
- Episode 7 music video: "Shake Your Body" by Tyra Banks
- Episode 8 photo shoot: Solstice sunglasses in the Verona Arena
- Episode 10 photo shoot: Nude in pairs
- Episode 11 photo shoot: High fashion beauty shots

=== Other cast members ===
- Jay Manuel – Photo Director
- J. Alexander – Runway Coach

=== Makeovers ===
- Heather - Dyed platinum blonde
- Jenascia - Shoulder-length cut to suit height
- Xiomara - Long wavy brown weave
- Catie - Twiggy inspired pixie cut
- Sara - Long brown extensions with honey blonde highlights
- Camille - Braids removed and long straight black weave
- April - Shoulder length cut with bangs and dyed black
- Shandi - Dyed platinum blonde and given contact lenses
- Mercedes - Long curly animalistic dark brown extensions and eyebrows lightened
- Yoanna - Modern mohawk style cut
