= True Beauty (American TV series) =

American TV series

- Judges: Season 1: Vanessa Minnillo; Nolé Marin; Cheryl Tiegs; Season 2: Vanessa Minnillo; Carson Kressley; Beth Stern
- Opening theme: So Beautiful
- Composer: Superchick
- Country of origin: United States
- No. of seasons: 2
- No. of episodes: 16

Production
- Executive producers: Tyra Banks; Ashton Kutcher; Denise Cramsey
- Running time: 60 minutes (including commercials)
- Production companies: Warner Horizon Television; Katalyst Films; Bankable Productions

Original release
- Network: ABC
- Release: January 5, 2009 – July 19, 2010

True Beauty is a television series in which contestants are competing to see who is the most beautiful. However, they think they are only being tested on outer beauty. The show is hosted by three judges, who judge the contestants on their inner beauty, in addition to their appearance. The contestants are competing for $100,000 and to be "featured in People magazine's 100 most beautiful people issue." The series is produced by Tyra Banks and Ashton Kutcher. It premiered on ABC on January 5, 2009. The second season premiered May 31, 2010.

== Season 1 ==
The first season premiered on January 5, 2009 on ABC, and featured judges Vanessa Minnillo, Nolé Marin, and Cheryl Tiegs. On the season finale, which first aired February 23, 2009, Julia Anderson was named the winner, with Joel Rush finishing second, and Billy Jeffrey in third place.

== Season 2 ==
The second season premiered on May 31, 2010 on ABC, and featured judges Vanessa Minnillo, Carson Kressley, and Beth Stern. On the season finale, which aired July 19, 2010, Taylor Bills was declared the winner, placing Erika Othen in second and Craig Franczyk in third.

== International airdates ==
Seasons
Country / Region	Network	Premiere	Season
Australia	Seven Network	July 16, 2009	2
Netherlands	RTL 5	September 2009	2
Hong Kong	ATV World	February 5, 2010	2
Denmark	Kanal 4	June 6, 2010	2
Russia	MTV Russia	June 6, 2010	2
United Kingdom	VIVA	July 26, 2010	1
France	Direct Star	September 31, 2010	2
New Zealand	TV2	October 15, 2010	1
Turkey	ShowPlus	2010	1
Norway	TvNorge Fem	2010	1
Brazil	E!	2009	1–2
Finland	Sub (TV channel)	2009	1
Mexico	E!	2009	1–2
Southeast Asia; India; Taiwan	STAR World	January 7, 2011	1–2
Philippines	STAR World/ ETC	April 11, 2011	1–2
Greece	Fox Life Greece	February 28, 2011	1–2
Portugal	MTV Portugal	June 20, 2011	2
Slovenia	TV3	May 2011	1
Poland	TV6	August 2011	1
Netherlands	RTL 5	January 2012	1
Israel	HOT 3	February 2012	1–2
Canada	MusiquePlus	2011	1–2
