= Nolé Marin =

Former director of AIM Model Management

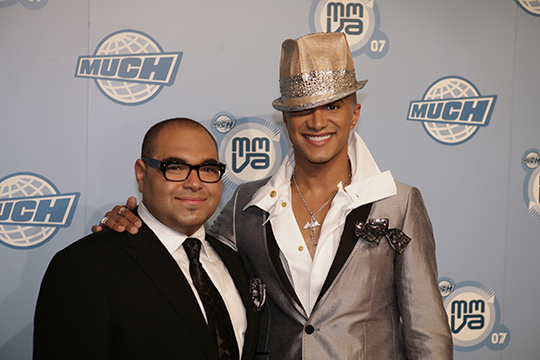
Nolé Marin (left) with Jay Manuel (right)

Nolé Marin (born October 22, 1969) is the former owner/director of AIM Model Management in New York City until the agency was closed in 2016 after declaring bankruptcy due to his booking agent and several of his models' accusations of wage theft.

He was a judge on the reality shows America’s Next Top Model and True Beauty. True Beauty was named “The Worst Show in TV Broadcast history” by Jezebel (website) and was subsequently cancelled after two seasons.

== Legal issues ==
Nicholas Hamman-Howe sued Marin in 2010 for allegedly "attempting to exchange career help for sex".

In 2016, Marin's booking agent Darrin Judkins sued him for failing to pay him wages owed over several months. Later in 2016, several of his models including Louisa Warwick, Devon White, Laura O'Neall, Lana Khanashevich, John Paul Pfeiffer and Patrick Kinnane sued him for failing to pay them for more than $500,000 owed from jobs.

In 2017, Marin declared bankruptcy.
