= List of Life in Pieces episodes =

Life in Pieces is an American sitcom that aired on CBS. It was created by Justin Adler and ran from September 21, 2015 to June 27, 2019. The series chronicles the lives of three generations of the Short family as they go about their daily lives in Los Angeles County. Each episode is told as four short stories, one for each branch of the Short family. On May 12, 2018, CBS renewed the series for a fourth season, which aired from on April 18 to June 27, 2019.

During the course of the series, 79 episodes of Life in Pieces aired over four seasons, from September 21, 2015 to June 27, 2019.

== Series overview ==
| Season | Episodes | Originally released | | Rank | Avg. viewership (inc. DVR) (in millions) |
| Season | Episodes | First released | Last released | Rank | Avg. viewership (inc. DVR) (in millions) |
|---|---|---|---|---|---|
| 1 | 22 | September 21, 2015 | March 31, 2016 | 30 | 10.53 |
| 2 | 22 | October 27, 2016 | May 11, 2017 | 40 | 8.15 |
| 3 | 22 | November 2, 2017 | May 17, 2018 | 44 | 8.27 |
| 4 | 13 | April 18, 2019 | June 27, 2019 | 77 | 6 |

== Episodes ==
=== Season 1 (2015–16) ===
| No. overall | No. in season | Title | Directed by | Written by | Original release date | Prod. code | US viewers (millions) |
|---|---|---|---|---|---|---|---|
| 1 | 1 | "Pilot" | Jason Winer | Justin Adler | September 21, 2015 | 1AYG01 | 11.28 |
In "Story One: First Date", Matt (Thomas Sadoski) and Colleen (Angelique Cabral) return from their first date, but her ex-fiance Chad (Jordan Peele) is still living at her house, and Matt is living with his parents Joan (Dianne Wiest) and John (James Brolin), so they have sex in the car – and are caught by the police.; In "Story Two: The Delivery", Jen's (Zoe Lister-Jones) vagina is ripped during childbirth and needs her husband Greg's (Colin Hanks) help in soothing recovery, via the help of a frozen ice-pack of unusual, albeit inventive origin, recommended by the obstetrician.; In "Story Three: The College Tour", Tim (Dan Bakkedahl) and Heather (Betsy Brandt) tour a college campus for their son Tyler (Niall Cunningham). In the hotel, their elder daughter Samantha (Holly J. Barrett) gets her first period and their younger daughter Sophia (Giselle Eisenberg) learns Santa is not real.; In "Story Four: The Funeral", John celebrates his 70th birthday with a living funeral for himself. His children Matt, Greg and Heather participate with their families.
| 2 | 2 | "Interruptus Date Breast Movin'" | Jason Winer | Justin Adler | September 28, 2015 | 1AYG02 | 8.71 |
In "Story One: Interruptus", Joan calls the entire family together to talk after Matt walks in on her having sex with John.; In "Story Two: Second Date", Matt has financial and car troubles while on his second date with Colleen.; In "Story Three: Breast-Feeding", Jen has trouble producing breast milk for her baby.; In "Story Four: Movin' Out", Heather has hired ex-convicts to help her family move to their new house which is located across the street from her parents, John and Joan.
| 3 | 3 | "Sleepy Email Brunch Tree" | Jeremy Garelick | Brad Copeland | October 5, 2015 | 1AYG03 | 8.91 |
In "Story One: Sleep Deprived", repeated caring for their infant daughter Lark has made Jen and Greg very sleepy. Troubles with a policeman begin when the sleepy Greg gets stopped during a night diaper run while driving at 14 MPH.; In "Story Two: Heather Sends an Email", with only 10 minutes remaining, Heather tries to handle interruptions while writing and sending an email.; In "Story Three: Colleen Meets the Family", Matt coaches Colleen on how to connect with the family when he invites her to brunch with them. They like her so much that they couldn't help but mention how they like her more than Matt's first wife. She didn't know that Matt had any wives.; In "Story Four: The Felling", Tim has a very bad reaction to espresso while John, Matt and Greg try and fail to chop down a tree in Greg's backyard.
| 4 | 4 | "Prison Baby Golf Picking" | Jason Winer | Kirker Butler | October 12, 2015 | 1AYG04 | 7.84 |
In "Story One: Chad's Last Meal", before Chad is to go away to jail for tax evasion, he gets one last meal with Matt, Colleen, and her grandmother Tonita (Tonita Castro), after which he runs away.; In "Story Two: Triangle", Greg tries to remain neutral between Jen and Joan, but his siblings praise him when they think that he stood up to Joan for questioning Jen's parenting skills.; In "Story Three: New Beds", Sophia hates sleeping alone at the new house and has had a peanut stuck up her nose for two weeks.; In "Story Four: Tim's Great Round", Matt, Greg and Heather each try to discourage Tim from beating John at a round of golf. During the last hole, John has a surprising way of getting Tim to lose.; Note: Netflix lists this episode as "Prison Baby Picking Golf".
| 5 | 5 | "Babe Secret Phone Germs" | Claire Scanlon | Rolin Jones | October 19, 2015 | 1AYG05 | 8.47 |
In "Story One: Tyler's Girlfriend", when Tyler introduces his gorgeous new girlfriend Clementine (Hunter King) to the family, Tim and Heather accidentally make things awkward.; In "Story Two: Work Secrets", Matt and Colleen are caught making out at work by an annoying coworker, Will (Ken Marino).; In "Story Three: First Cellphone", without her parents' knowledge, John buys Sophia a cell phone.; In "Story Four: Germs", Jen and Greg vow to not become germaphobes.
| 6 | 6 | "Ponzi Sex Paris Bounce" | Jason Winer | Lesley Wake Webster | November 5, 2015 | 1AYG06 | 7.88 |
In "Story One: Ponzí", when Matt and Colleen catch Chad trying to dognap Princess, Chad pitches them a skincare direct selling venture.; In "Story Two: Sex Green Light", Jen and Greg keep trying to get intimate for the first time since Lark was born.; In "Story Three: Paris", Heather quits going to her longtime hairstylist, Lynette (Alex Borstein), but tells her that it's because she's moving to Paris next week.; In "Story Four: Bounce House", Tim ruins Samantha's birthday party by letting them watch the R-rated horror movie, Alien.
| 7 | 7 | "Nanny Tent Earrings Cheeto" | Jason Winer | Elizabeth Tippet | November 12, 2015 | 1AYG08 | 7.99 |
In "Story One: Nanny", when Jen and Greg interview potential nannies for Lark, they find it difficult to find any that they trust. They end up choosing Tonita.; In "Story Two: Tent Diving", while Tim, Matt and Greg are camping, their attempt to deal with some tent "crashers" goes badly wrong.; In "Story Three: Colleen's New Earrings", Heather falsely accuses Matt of using money she loaned him to buy Colleen earrings.; In "Story Four: Cheeto", John makes a wooden puppet named "Cheeto" for Lark that various family members use to surprise and/or scare each other.
| 8 | 8 | "Godparent Turkey Corn Farts" | Chad Lowe | Maggie Mull | November 19, 2015 | 1AYG09 | 8.35 |
In "Story One: Godparent", Jen and Greg debate who should be Lark's godparent.; In "Story Two: The Mexican Market", Tim and Sophia search for a quick replacement for Heather's spoiled turkey.; In "Story Three: The Maize Runner", at the Harvest Festival, Samantha sneaks into the corn maze with her boyfriend, Aiden (Griffin Gluck).; In "Story Four: Can't Keep It In", Joan invites their neighbor Gary Timpkins (Martin Mull) to Thanksgiving dinner, during which everyone has a bad reaction to Colleen's cauliflower rice dish.
| 9 | 9 | "Hospital Boudoir Time-Out Namaste" | Fred Goss | Alec Sulkin | November 26, 2015 | 1AYG07 | 7.61 |
In "Story One: First Night Out", when Jen cuts her finger and Greg takes her to the hospital, they finally have the first quality alone time they've had in months.; In "Story Two: Boudoir Photos", Heather gives Tim a sexy anniversary gift.; In "Story Three: Time-Out", Sophia is punished after Heather hears her swearing.; In "Story Four: Namaste Noshery", John takes Samantha and Sophia to a restaurant where everything is named after feelings.
| 10 | 10 | "Burn Vasectomy Milkshake Pong" | Jason Winer | Greg Malins | December 10, 2015 | 1AYG10 | 8.24 |
In "Story One: Controlled Burn", when Jen is anxious about returning to work, Heather and Tim advise Greg to make Jen angry at him.; In "Story Two: Vasectomy", Heather questions herself after Tim gets a vasectomy at her urging.; In "Story Three: Milkshake", Joan learns her credit card has been stolen when strange packages she never ordered start arriving.; In "Story Four: Ping-Pong", when Greg and Matt finish a game of ping-pong that an accident interrupted years ago, one of them loses a tooth.
| 11 | 11 | "College Stealing Santa Caroling" | Phil Traill | Barbara Adler | December 17, 2015 | 1AYG11 | 10.26 |
In "Story One: College", Tyler announces his plans for being in a band with Clementine instead of going to college.; In "Story Two: How Joan Stole Christmas", Joan apologizes for hijacking Lark's first Christmas from Jen and Greg.; In "Story Three: A Gift From Santa", when Samantha sneaks out with her friends to the mall, she gets lice from the mall Santa's beard and she gets caught when a photo of her with the mall Santa is posted online.; In "Story Four: John Goes Caroling", Colleen goes with John to meet with his Air Force buddies for their annual tradition of dirty Christmas caroling.
| 12 | 12 | "Bite Flight Wing-Man Bonnie" | Helen Hunt | Justin Adler | January 7, 2016 | 1AYG12 | 9.27 |
In "Story One: Bite", Sophia has a run-in with Pete (Sage Correa), the son of Tim and Heather's new friends.; In "Story Two: Flight", Greg and Jen attempt to take different flights on a vacation.; In "Story Three: Wing-Man", Matt and John try to help Gary get back in the dating scene.; In "Story Four: Bonnie", Matt's ex-wife, Bonnie (Brenda Song), shows up with a proposition.
| 13 | 13 | "Party Lobster Gym Sale" | Ken Whittingham | Brad Copeland | January 14, 2016 | 1AYG13 | 9.15 |
In "Story One: Gym", Greg decides to get in shape after getting winded playing charades.; In "Story Two: Party", while Tim and Heather have a get-away, the kids host a house party featuring Tyler's band, Funeral Goose.; In "Story Three: Garage Sale", when Joan has a garage sale, Heather and Jen take the opportunity to sell some unwanted gifts at their own secret garage sale.; In "Story Four: Lobster", a live Maine lobster sent to Tim by a friend goes missing.; Note: Netflix lists this episode as "Gym Party Sale Lobster".
| 14 | 14 | "Will Trash Book Spa" | Jason Winer | Kirker Butler | January 21, 2016 | 1AYG14 | 8.78 |
In "Story One: Will", Jen helps John and Joan with their will.; In "Story Two: Trash", Tim, Heather and their kids have a contest to see who generates the least trash.; In "Story Three: Book Deal", Colleen asks Matt to illustrate a children's book she is writing.; In "Story Four: Couple's Massage", a couple's massage at a day spa for Greg and Jen doesn't turn out to be as relaxing as they expected.
| 15 | 15 | "Soccer Gigi TV Mikey" | Alisa Statman | Lesley Wake Webster | February 4, 2016 | 1AYG15 | 9.09 |
In "Story One: Coach Matt", Matt takes over for Tim as coach of Sophia's soccer team, the "Bobcats", and has to deal with the kids' parents.; In "Story Two: Tyler's First Car", Tyler and Clementine visit his great-grandmother Gigi Pirkle (Ann Guilbert), who has lost her driving license and wants to give her car to Tyler.; In "Story Three: TV Sleeper", after Greg discovers restful sleep on the den couch, Greg and Jen find a creative solution to their sleeping woes.; In "Story Four: Cousin Mikey", Joan's nephew Mikey (Greg Grunberg) comes by for a visit and seems to annoy the whole family.
| 16 | 16 | "Tattoo Valentine Guitar Pregnant" | Jason Winer | Alec Sulkin | February 11, 2016 | 1AYG16 | 9.35 |
In "Story One: Tattoo", Tim makes a spelling error when getting a tattoo, made by Lois (Kat Von D), to surprise Heather for Valentine's Day.; In "Story Two: Valentine", after Matt scrambles to make some last minute dinner plans for Valentine's Day with Colleen, he ends up having to also invite his parents.; In "Story Three: Guitar", when Tyler and Clementine go to a guitar store, the salesman, Ian (Josh Groban), repeatedly hits on her.; In "Story Four: Pregnant", after Greg and Jen discuss possibly having another child, they are visited by a stork.
| 17 | 17 | "Hair Recital Rainbow Mom" | Ken Whittingham | Elizabeth Tippet | February 18, 2016 | 1AYG17 | 9.34 |
In "Story One: Johnny Flyer Black", John tries to make himself look younger by dyeing his hair black, much to the dismay of the family.; In "Story Two: Sophia's Piano Recital", Heather worries that Sophia's piano recital will be a disaster.; In "Story Three: Invisible Rainbows", Jen, Greg and Lark go to an over-the-top "6-month birthday" party for Wilhelm full of overachieving parents who make them panic about getting Lark into a good preschool.; In "Story Four: Mama Mia", Matt meets Colleen's mother, Mia (Mercedes Ruehl), for the first time. Later, Colleen breaks up with Matt.
| 18 | 18 | "Sexting Mall Lemonade Heartbreak" | Rebecca Asher | Maggie Mull | February 25, 2016 | 1AYG18 | 9.21 |
In "Story One: What's Wrong With Heather?", Heather accidentally sends Tyler a sexy text message intended for Tim.; In "Story Two: Irving Rosenblatt", Jen and Greg advise Samantha to talk in person to her social-media boyfriend, Irving Rosenblatt (Alek Brett Cole).; In "Story Three: Lemonade", after John's new pet, a Shetland pony named Lemonade, ends up being unsuitable for their home, Joan gets him a Yorkie named Tank.; In "Story Four: Girls' Night", Heather and Jen console Colleen and Matt over their break-up.
| 19 | 19 | "Pestilence War Famine Death" | Phil Traill | Greg Malins | March 3, 2016 | 1AYG19 | 8.40 |
In "Story One: Pestilence", Greg and Jen have their exterminator, Oscar (Martin Starr), and his wife, Tulip (Ayden Mayeri) over for dinner. Later, a rat is shown dragging away Greg's signed Playboy magazine.; In "Story Two: War", John and Joan disagree with their neighbors, Darryl (J. B. Smoove) and Pam (Pam Trotter), about who gets to use the hot tub when new property lines are drawn.; In "Story Three: Famine", Matt and Colleen make an effort to be friends.; In "Story Four: Death", John's heart stopped beating for 15 seconds during his minor nose surgery that Tim performed.
| 20 | 20 | "Prank Assistant Gum Puppy" | Chad Lowe | Barbara Adler | March 10, 2016 | 1AYG20 | 8.55 |
In "Story One: Senior Prank", a drunk Heather and Tim switch letters around on a sign at Tyler's school, which causes trouble for Tyler.; In "Story Two: Jen's Hot Assistant", Greg gets jealous of Jen's handsome new assistant, Jake (Gregg Sulkin).; In "Story Three: Chewing Gum", Sophia gets gum stuck in her hair at Joan's house.; In "Story Four: Puppy Love", John and Colleen secretly meet together along with their dogs at a dog park.
| 21 | 21 | "Cinderella Fantasy Prom Dougie", Part 1 | Phil Traill | Joe Cristalli | March 31, 2016 | 1AYG21 | 7.23 |
Presented as Part 1 of combined Episode 21 & Episode 22: In "Story One: A "Cinderella Story", Tim believes wearing a Cinderella dress during March Madness is good luck, so he refuses to take it off in hopes that his alma mater's basketball team, the Gophers of Mount St. Gary's, will win.; In "Story Two: The Secret Life of Greg Short", Greg fantasizes about what to write in a birthday card for his boss, Chase (Jerry Lambert).; In "Story Three: Prom Night", before Tyler goes to the prom, he receives unsolicited advice from his parents and grandparents regarding sex. At the prom, when Clementine gives Tyler a purity ring, he responds by asking her to marry him.; In "Story Four: Matt's Choice", Jen sets Matt up on a blind date bowling with her coworker, Dougie (Fortune Feimster). Later, Matt and Colleen get back together.
| 22 | 22 | "Crytunes Divorce Tablet Ring", Part 2 | Chad Lowe | Justin Adler | March 31, 2016 | 1AYG22 | 7.23 |
Presented as Part 2 of combined Episode 21 & Episode 22: In "Story Five: CryTunes", Greg quits his job after creating a public funding campaign for his own invention, the "CryTunes" baby monitor that turns sounds of baby crying into soothing music. Also, Jen learns that she is pregnant.; In "Story Six: Divorce", John and Joan reveal a secret they've kept from their kids for 35 years: they have been divorced since 1980 (the year before Greg was born).; In "Story Seven: "Tablet", Heather and Tim try to make up for missing Samantha's Student of the Month Ceremony at school.; In "Story Eight: Ring", Matt's plan to pop the question to Colleen at their book party keeps getting delayed by several family revelations: a remarriage proposal, a pregnancy, a lost job, and a recent teenage marriage. However, he does successfully propose to Colleen in his parents' bathroom.

=== Season 2 (2016–17) ===
Hunter King, who played Clementine as a recurring guest during the first season, became a regular cast member for the second season.

| No. overall | No. in season | Title | Directed by | Written by | Original release date | Prod. code | US viewers (millions) |
|---|---|---|---|---|---|---|---|
| 23 | 1 | "Annulled Roommate Pill Shower" | Jason Winer | Justin Adler | October 27, 2016 | 2AYG01 | 5.96 |
In "Story One: Moving In", Heather attempts to convince Tyler and Clementine to annul their sudden marriage. Clementine's mother, Mary-Lynn (Megan Mullally), and uncle/de facto father, Spencer (Nick Offerman), with whom Clementine's mother has a bizarrely close relationship, are no help.; In "Story Two: Moving Out", after Matt moves in with Colleen, Colleen's obnoxious roommate Dougie challenges Matt to a wrestling match over whether she will move out.; In "Story Three: Pill", John is hospitalized with an unusually long-lasting erection after taking erectile medication, unaware that Joan was already regularly crushing one into his smoothies.; In "Story Four: Baby Shower", the family must quickly call off a surprise baby shower for Jen after learning that she miscarried.
| 24 | 2 | "Receptionist Pot Voting Cramp" | Alisa Statman | Brad Copeland | November 3, 2016 | 2AYG02 | 5.92 |
In "Story One: Receptionist", Tim's receptionist quits, so Heather, who is just visiting the office, takes over; Tim enjoys it for a day, but is not pleased when Heather decides she wants the job permanently.; In "Story Two: Joan's Friend, Herb", Joan is talked into trying marijuana to help with her insomnia.; In "Story Three: Voting", Greg, who has never voted in a presidential election, decides he will do so to get Jen off his back, but things change when he sees the line at the polling place is too long.; In "Story Four: Cramped", Colleen is taken to the hospital with stomach pains, and it is revealed she hasn't done a "number two" since Matt moved in a week ago.
| 25 | 3 | "Eyebrow Anonymous Trapped Gem" | Chad Lowe | Barbara Adler | November 10, 2016 | 2AYG03 | 6.23 |
After this episode's content is the dedication "In loving Memory of Ann Guilbert" along with a picture of her. She played Joan's mother, Shirley "Gigi" Pirkle, before dying in June 2016.: In "Story One: Take a Brow", Tim accidentally shaves off part of an eyebrow before an important photo shoot at work, and all attempts to correct the problem just make it worse.; In "Story Two: Anonymous", Greg uses his share from the will of Gigi, Joan's recently deceased mother, to make an anonymous donation to his old high school track team, but gets annoyed when the team gives Matt the credit.; In "Story Three: Home Sweet Nursing Home", John goes to Gigi's nursing home to pick up her things, and is unable to leave when the employees assume he is a resident.; In "Story Four: Gigi in the Sky with Diamonds", Joan fulfills Gigi's dying wish to have her ashes made into a gemstone, but finds she cannot wear the finished jewelry without hearing her mother's nagging voice.
| 26 | 4 | "Cheap Promotion Flying Birthday" | Alex Reid | Dave Jeser and Matt Silverstein | November 17, 2016 | 2AYG05 | 6.65 |
In "Story One: Colleen Returns", Colleen gets Matt interested in her frugal habits, including returning old items for a refund and shopping at dollar stores, when he finds out how much saving money turns her on.; In "Story Two: Hughes the Boss", Tim wants to fire Heather from the receptionist position at the office, but manages to promote her instead, before having Matilda (Karen Lew) of the HR department fire her.; In "Story Three: Take Me to the Pilot", John tries to ease Sophia's fear of flying by tricking her into taking ride in his single-engine plane.; In "Story Four: Lark's First Birthday", Jen plans a small first birthday party for Lark before deciding it should be a bigger deal and inviting the whole family over at the last minute.
| 27 | 5 | "Dinner Professor Steps Lesbian" | John Riggi | Maggie Mull | November 24, 2016 | 2AYG09 | 5.27 |
In "Story One: Dinner Party", Tyler and Clementine invite Matt and Colleen over for their first dinner party as husband and wife, but it becomes awkward when the hosts start to argue.; In "Story Two: Joan's Novel Idea", Joan's young creative writing teacher, Professor Sinclair Wilde (Cary Elwes), takes an interest in her work, but John suspects the professor really has a romantic interest in his wife.; In "Story Three: Baby Steps", Lark takes her first steps while Greg is out of town, so Jen tries to hide it from her husband.; In "Story Four: Ladies' Night", Dougie comes out as gay to Colleen and Matt, and later has Colleen, Jen and Heather join her at a gay bar to help her pick up a woman for the first time.
| 28 | 6 | "Boxing Opinion Spider Beard" | Jason Winer | Lesley Wake Webster | December 1, 2016 | 2AYG04 | 6.28 |
In "Story One: Samantha's Double Cross", instead of dropping Samantha off at ballet class, John takes her to his gym to box with his trainer, Troy (Victor Ortiz), but he gets jealous when she is a natural at boxing and commands all the attention.; In "Story Two: Second Opinion", Jen angers Tim after he recommends getting her tonsils removed and she goes to another doctor for a second opinion.; In "Story Three: Joan Scares Matt", Joan plays a prank by scaring Matt again with a fake spider, and both Greg and Heather reveal she has enjoyed scaring them in the past. The three then plot to get revenge on their mom.; In "Story Four: Jen v. Beard", Jen tries to convince Greg to shave off his recently grown beard, but nothing works until Lark vomits into it and Greg can't wash out the stench.
| 29 | 7 | "Swim Survivor Zen Talk" | Jude Weng | Joe Cristalli | December 8, 2016 | 2AYG10 | 6.45 |
In "Story One: Sink Or Swim", Matt wants to go snorkeling in Hawaii for his and Colleen's honeymoon, but Colleen says she's never learned to swim.; In "Story Two: Survivor", John is making a video audition for Survivor with Tim's assistance, but Tim tries to turn it into his own audition.; In "Story Three: Zen Jen", Jen tells the group she's taken up meditation, but it's really just an excuse to steal away for 20 minutes of "me" time whenever she needs.; In "Story Four: The Talk", Sophia's curiosity about babies inspires Heather to give her "the talk", but afterwards, Sophia can't stop talking about sex, even in inappropriate situations.
| 30 | 8 | "Window Vanity Dress Grace" | Helen Hunt | Greg Malins | December 15, 2016 | 2AYG06 | 6.94 |
In "Story One: Sex Window", Greg gets frustrated when Jen can't stay awake after a romantic date night; In "Story Two: Bonfire of the Vanity", John and Matt attempt to build a vanity for Sophia after John rips up the directions; In "Story Three: Dress Rehearsal", when Colleen goes wedding dress shopping with her future in-laws, she must deal with Joan's unfiltered opinions.; In "Story Four: Saying Grace", when Clementine feels she's overstaying her welcome at the Hughes house, she starts being extra nice to Tim who takes it the wrong way;
| 31 | 9 | "#TBT: Y2K Sophia Honeymoon Critter" | Jason Winer | Marcos Luevanos | January 5, 2017 | 2AYG08 | 6.71 |
A #TBT (Throwback Thursday) episode has the Shorts taking a trip down memory lane: In "Story One: #TBT Y2K" (1999): At John and Joan's party celebrating the turn of the century, John convinces everyone present that there will be chaos when the clock strikes midnight.; In "Story Two: #TBT Sophia" (2008): Heather and Tim's parenting styles before they had Sophia.; In "Story Three: #TBT Honeymoon" (2011): During Jen and Greg's honeymoon, Jen realizes the extent to which Joan is involved in Greg's life.; In "Story Four: #TBT Matt's Bottom" (2013): The moment that Matt and Colleen first met.
| 32 | 10 | "Musical Motel Property Bingo" | Chad Lowe | Justin Adler | January 12, 2017 | 2AYG11 | 5.95 |
In "Story One: Sam's School Play", Heather freaks out when Samantha auditions for the high school musical and the director, Julius Black (Andy Richter), doesn't give her a part.; In "Story Two: No Tell Motel", Matt, Greg and Heather suspect Joan is having an affair with Professor Sinclair Wilde.; In "Story Three: Tyler and Clementine Can't Even", using 10 brand new credit cards, Tyler and Clementine buy a "tiny house" of their own to live in.; In "Story Four: Family Bingo", Jen, Colleen and Tim secretly play "Short Family Bingo" to pass the time during the weekly Sunday brunch.
| 33 | 11 | "Tailgate Spiral Souvenir Seating" | Jim Hensz | Elizabeth Tippet | January 19, 2017 | 2AYG07 | 6.95 |
In "Story One: Tailgating", when Colleen and Matt host the family tailgate party at an L.A. Rams game, they invite former NFL quarterback Kurt Warner to spice up their so far dismal event.; In "Story Two: Downward Spiral", Greg wins a chance to participate in a halftime contest involving a football toss.; In "Story Three: Sophia's Choice", Tim's in danger of missing the game when Sophia makes him take her to the restroom and they get sidetracked returning to their seats.; In "Story Four: Seating Arrangement", Joan and Jen try to sneak into seats closer to the field.
| 34 | 12 | "Best Waxing Grocery Rental" | Jim Hensz | Lesley Wake Webster | February 2, 2017 | 2AYG14 | 6.62 |
In "Story One: Second Best Man", when Greg insists on being Matt's best man at his wedding, Matt is forced to reveal his secret about their plans for eloping.; In "Story Two: Splitting Hairs", Colleen refers Jen to her aggressive bikini waxer, Tittianna (Annie Sertich), in order to get a referral discount.; In "Story Three: Miss Independent", Joan tries to prove to Heather that Sophia is ready for a little independence.; In "Story Four: Clementine Gets A Job", Clementine gets a job at "The Car People" car rental office, leaving Tyler home alone all day.
| 35 | 13 | "Chef Rescue Negotiator Necklace" | Alisa Statman | Barbara Adler | February 9, 2017 | 2AYG13 | 6.08 |
In "Story One: The Personal Chef", when Greg and Jen hire Allie (Molly Shannon), a private chef, to cook for them on Valentine's Day, the evening isn't as romantic as they had hoped.; In "Story Two: Dog Rescue", Matt and Colleen try to adopt a 3-legged dog from Ruth (Angela Kinsey), a judgmental animal advocate.; In "Story Three: The Best Valentine's Day Ever", Sophia gets a necklace from a boy for Valentine's Day, to the chagrin of Heather and Tim.; In "Story Four: Negotiation", John and Joan attempt to buy a classic car from dealership owner Gavin (Leslie David Baker).
| 36 | 14 | "Facebook Fish Planner Backstage" | Jaffar Mahmood | Brad Copeland | February 16, 2017 | 2AYG12 | 6.33 |
In "Story One: Slow Pokes", John and Joan join Facebook so they can stay connected to the kids.; In "Story Two: Derek", Heather manically tries to save Sophia's beloved goldfish, Derek, from dying.; In "Story Three: Wedding Plans", Matt and Colleen realize how out of control planning a wedding can get after meeting with their offbeat wedding planner, Ned Gawler (Lyle Lovett).; In "Story Four: Backstage", when Tim gets two all-access passes to the Grammy Awards from his rock star patient, Charlie Puth, he brings Samantha along to backstage of the show to impress her.
| 37 | 15 | "Awkward Bra Automated Ordained" | Rebecca Asher | Dave Jeser & Matt Silverstein | February 23, 2017 | 2AYG15 | 5.98 |
In "Story One: Party of Two", a restaurant dinner originally for four gets awkward for Jen and Matt without Greg and Colleen.; In "Story Two: Wine Bra", Heather and Tim try to sneak wine into an ice skating show to get out of paying at the venue.; In "Story Three: Future House", Lark accidentally locks out Greg and Jen from the house, prompting Greg to have a complicated home automation system installed.; In "Story Four: Ordained", when Colleen mentions that she's an ordained minister, John and Joan agree to an impromptu wedding. When Colleen and Matt find out that her $7 online ordination was invalid, they decide to keep it a secret. During the wedding rehearsal, John and Joan decide they prefer living together as partners and they cancel the wedding.
| 38 | 16 | "Dirtbike Old Mechanic Earthquake" | Jonathan Judge | Greg Malins | March 9, 2017 | 2AYG16 | 6.13 |
In "Story One: Trapper Keeper", Greg stirs up an old family feud when he finds money (about $200) he had accused Matt of stealing from him when they were kids.; In "Story Two: Something's Wrong With Mom-Mom", Joan takes offense when Heather writes off her forgetfulness as "old age".; In "Story Three: Colleen Rattled", Colleen confronts a mechanic, Dabney (Ty Barnett), that she believes is sexist.; In "Story Four: Hughes Prepared", Tim has the kids go through an impromptu earthquake drill to see if they could figure out how to get home without money or cell service.
| 39 | 17 | "Sleepover Dream Light Haze" | Ken Whittingham | Elizabeth Tippet | March 30, 2017 | 2AYG17 | 5.59 |
In "Story One: Sleepover", Tim regrets missing a slumber party when he was a kid so he insists on helping Sophia make it through a friend's sleepover.; In "Story Two: Jen Had a Dream", Greg gets upset when Jen reveals she had a sex dream about a member of the family.; In "Story Three: Sensor and Sensibility", John installs a motion-sensor light in the yard that flashes repeatedly, keeping them up at night.; In "Story Four: Full Moon Madness", when Matt and Colleen take a strong sleep aid, they start experiencing crazy sleepwalking adventures.
| 40 | 18 | "Favorite Vision Miguel Matchmaker" | Chris Koch | Marcos Leuvanos | April 6, 2017 | 2AYG18 | 5.68 |
In "Story One: Playing Favorites", Greg becomes frazzled when Lark rebuffs him and only wants to be held by Jen.; In "Story Two: Heather Gives In", Heather refuses to get the reading glasses that she desperately needs.; In "Story Three: Father's Blessing", Colleen introduces Matt to her eccentric father, Miguel (Daniel Zacapa), so he can get his blessing for their upcoming nuptials.; In "Story Four: Mikey's Girlfriend", when Cousin Mikey (Greg Grunberg) goes through a tough breakup, Joan tries to set him up on a date.
| 41 | 19 | "Babysit Argument Invention Butterfly" | Eric Dean Seaton | Maggie Mull | April 13, 2017 | 2AYG19 | 5.42 |
In "Story One: Babysitting", Matt and Colleen have a disastrous time babysitting Lark while Jen is at work.; In "Story Two: The Naked Truth", Tyler and Clementine tell Tim their argument management method: they only fight each other while naked. Later, Tim and Heather use this method when they rehash an old fight from the early days of their relationship.; In "Story Three: The Entrepreneurs", Greg gives Samantha questionable advice about being an entrepreneur for her school project.; In "Story Four: The Butterfly Effect", Sophia is far from pleased when John buys her a butterfly kit for her birthday.
| 42 | 20 | "Ear Scorn Registry Manuscript" | Alisa Statman | Joe Cristalli | April 27, 2017 | 2AYG20 | 5.51 |
In "Story One: Colleen's Web", when Colleen goes to Tim for help with an embarrassing ear ailment, she begs him not to tell the family.; In "Story Two: Queen J", Heather gets jealous when her friends want to include Jen in their mommy group.; In "Story Three: Bull In A China Shop", Dougie enlists Joan to help her buy a gift for Matt and Colleen's wedding.; In "Story Four: Family Book Club", Professor Sinclair Wilde encourages Joan to ask her family to read a draft of her book.
| 43 | 21 | "Late Smuggling Dreambaby Voucher" | Angela Gomes | Brad Copeland | May 4, 2017 | 2AYG21 | 6.11 |
In "Story One: Airport Rush", Heather and Tim run into countless obstacles when trying to get to the airport on time.; In "Story Two: All Dogs Go To Mexico", Joan and John attempt to smuggle their dog, Tank, onto the plane.; In "Story Three: Fly Baby", when Greg and Jen take Lark on her first airplane trip, their parental skills are upstaged by another couple travelling with their baby.; In "Story Four: Not-Rushin' Roulette", Matt and Colleen miss their flights when they accept travel vouchers for airline credits.
| 44 | 22 | "Poison Fire Teats Universe" | Jude Weng | Barbara Adler | May 11, 2017 | 2AYG22 | 5.97 |
In "Story One: Baking A Murderer", Greg and Jen get into trouble after Greg shares a coconut cookie with a fellow plane passenger, Max (Mark Beltzman), who has a severe allergic reaction to it.; In "Story Two: The Hughes, The Hughes, The Hughes Is On Fire", after a fire breaks out in their kitchen, the Hughes family moves into Tyler and Clementine's tiny house.; In "Story Three: Alas, Poor Yorkie", Joan and John rush their dog, Tank, to the vet after he swallows Matt's wedding ring.; In "Story Four: For Better Or For Worse", when Colleen and Matt miss all the flights to Mexico for their wedding, they question if they will ever get married. Later at the layover hotel, they get married in a makeshift setting, officiated by Greg and witnessed by most of Matt's relatives (who had also failed to reach Mexico). Afterwards when Colleen and Matt are next to a balcony railing, it breaks, causing her to fall into the hotel pool far below.

=== Season 3 (2017–18) ===
| No. overall | No. in season | Title | Directed by | Written by | Original release date | Prod. code | US viewers (millions) |
|---|---|---|---|---|---|---|---|
| 45 | 1 | "Settlement Pacifier Attic Unsyncing" | John Riggi | Justin Adler | November 2, 2017 | 3AYG01 | 6.67 |
When the entire Hughes family moves into John and Joan's home after their kitchen is destroyed, their presence creates chaos for Joan.: In "Story One: Settlement", Matt and Colleen's are set to receive a huge monetary settlement from Colleen's fall off the motel balcony on their wedding night. Their spending spree ends when they are told about the motel's filing for bankruptcy.; In "Story Two: The Pacifier Fairy", Jen and Greg attempt to persuade Lark to get rid of her pacifier.; In "Story Three: Hide and Sophia", John tries to get Sophia back on track when she starts misbehaving.; In "Story Four: Out of Sync", Tyler and Clementine announce that they have filed for divorce but will still be living together.
| 46 | 2 | "Bunny Single Nightmare Drinking" | Eric Dean Seaton | Brad Copeland | November 9, 2017 | 3AYG02 | 6.53 |
In "Story One: By Any Other Name", when Jen invites her boss, Paul (Andy Buckley), and his wife, Rose (Julie Chen), over to dinner to impress him, she and Greg can't remember his wife's name and scramble to avoid embarrassment.; In "Story Two: Tyler Moves On", Tim urges Tyler to start dating.; In "Story Three: Matt's Dream", Matt ends up having a nightmare about parenting after he and Colleen discuss having children.; In "Story Four: Joansin' for a Drink", Joan grows increasingly stressed about Heather living with her.
| 47 | 3 | "Treasure Ride Poker Hearing" | Jonathan Judge | Barbara Adler | November 16, 2017 | 3AYG03 | 6.37 |
In "Story One: X Marks the Spot", when Heather finds a map to a time capsule she buried with her brothers as kids, they all set out to find it and dig it up.; In "Story Two: The Pick-Up Artist", Jen learns she has a low car passenger service rating so she books rides across the city to charm drivers and increase her score.; In "Story Three: Queens are Wild", Joan joins her neighbor's poker game in an effort to win an unusual prize.; In "Story Four: Hear and Loathing", John finally gets hearing aids but they aren't having the effect he was hoping for.
| 48 | 4 | "Testosterone Martyr Baked Knife" | Jaffar Mahmood | Lesley Wake Webster | November 23, 2017 | 3AYG04 | 5.93 |
In "Story One: Mr. T", Greg has a boost of self-confidence after learning he has high levels of testosterone.; In "Story Two: Joan's Day Off", when Heather, Clementine and Jen offer to save Joan from the stress of preparing the Thanksgiving meal, the free time leaves Joan even more stressed out.; In "Story Three: Baked With Love", Samantha tries to keep a secret from her family during Thanksgiving dinner.; In "Story Four: Knife of the Round Table", John is determined to continue the tradition of using his "Electric Carving Knife" (even though it is now old and unsafe) to carve the turkey.
| 49 | 5 | "Meal Potty Cart Middle" | Jonathan Judge | Jordan Young | November 30, 2017 | 3AYG05 | 6.57 |
In "Story One: Boccone", when Tim and Heather go to an expensive restaurant to celebrate their anniversary, they are determined to finish every bite of their pricey 20-course meal.; In "Story Two: Potty Training Lark", Jen and Greg try to quickly potty-train Lark before her first day of preschool.; In "Story Three: The New Cart Girl", Tyler gets jealous of the attention Clementine is getting at work.; In "Story Four: Middle Child Day", Matt and Samantha team up for a "Middle Child Day" and go to a trapeze school.
| 50 | 6 | "Waffle Permission Kidless Boyfriend" | John Riggi | Elizabeth Tippet | December 7, 2017 | 3AYG06 | 6.49 |
In "Story One: Waffle Party", Matt and Colleen regret returning their wedding presents unopened for cash when they learn that John and Joan had stuffed their gift's box full of cash.; In "Story Two: Permission", when Heather tries to become Tyler's cool best friend, things take an awkward turn at an R-rated movie.; In "Story Three: A Night Away", Jen and Greg get their first overnight away from Lark.; In "Story Four: Samantha's Boyfriend", listening to John causes Tim to overdo keeping a watchful eye on Samantha and her boyfriend.
| 51 | 7 | "Thirty-Five Teacher Escape Lottery" | Jaffar Mahmood | Maggie Mull | December 14, 2017 | 3AYG07 | 6.65 |
In "Story One: Jen's Birthday", when Jen and Greg hire Clementine as a part-time nanny for Lark and invite her to join them for dinner, the waitress (Anne Bedian) mistakes Jen for Lark's grandmother.; In "Story Two: Teacher's Pet", Tyler's new girlfriend, Alex Morandi (Christine Woods), turns out to also be Sophia's fourth grade teacher.; In "Story Three: The Escape Room", a questionable company that John hired to set up an escape room in his house also steals a large portion of the house's contents.; In "Story Four: The Lost Ticket", Matt grows frustrated with Colleen when she blames a valet for stealing her lottery ticket.
| 52 | 8 | "The Twelve Shorts of Christmas" | Jeffrey Walker | Joe Cristalli | December 21, 2017 | 3AYG08 | 6.72 |
In "1st Short of Christmas", Greg's enjoyment of some classic music on the radio gets recorded by Matt.; In "2nd Short of Christmas", during Tyler and Clementine's Christmas party at their tiny house, Joan gets crowd surfed.; In "3rd Short of Christmas", John donates more to charity than he initially intended.; In "4th Short of Christmas", Matt gets his siblings to help in making a new version of a childhood photograph.; In "5th Short of Christmas", Joan's robotic vacuum cleaner gets depressed and destroys itself.; In "6th Short of Christmas", Jen's fireplace chimney has a "bee hole".; In "7th Short of Christmas", Colleen and Matt bring a bottle of fancy wine to Joan's party.; In "8th Short of Christmas", Sophia drinks some leftover eggnog that was spiked for the earlier party.; In "9th Short of Christmas", Lark receives a playhouse (formerly a metal dog cage) after her parents realize that the very large dog that was going to be a gift for her was unsuitable.; In "10th Short of Christmas", Samantha receives a plane ticket for her to attend a summer art school in France.; In "11th Short of Christmas", Heather receives cherry-themed presents.; In "12th Short of Christmas", the family watches a DVD of several family members.
| 53 | 9 | "Reading Egg Nurse Neighbor" | Marcus Stokes | Dave Jeser & Matt Silverstein | January 4, 2018 | 3AYG09 | 7.43 |
In "Story One: Romancing the Joan", the whole family surprises Joan at her book reading, to her chagrin.; In "Story Two: The Chicken and the Egg", when Sophia asks Matt and Colleen about having children, an animated sequence featuring the whole family as farm animals reveals that they have been struggling to have a baby.; In "Story Three: Tim Hires a Nurse", Heather interferes with Tim's hiring process at the office.; In "Story Four: Neighbor Friends!", Jen and Greg's new neighbors seem nice, but Greg observes the husband threatening an elderly woman.
| 54 | 10 | "Emergency Interview Driving Lunch" | Melissa Kosar | Kyle Mack | January 11, 2018 | 3AYG10 | 7.18 |
Each time that Matt has 30 minutes to get a brown bag with a cup containing his sperm to the fertility clinic, a different crisis arises preventing him from getting it there within time.: In "Story One: Emergency", Heather calls Matt when she thinks she's having a heart attack for him to take her to the hospital.; In "Story Two: The Interview", Greg calls Matt when he needs help to manage medicated John and Joan during Greg's important scheduled videocall.; In "Story Three: Baby Driver", a telemarketer's call to Matt ends with Matt passing the bag to Tim and Samantha (who also fail).; In "Story Four: Stolen Lunch", when Colleen calls Matt, the bag accidentally get swapped with Dougie's booby-trapped lunchbag.
| 55 | 11 | "Goose Friends Auction Fog" | Ken Whittingham | Liz Hara | January 18, 2018 | 3AYG11 | 6.79 |
In "Story One: Jen Gets Goosed", when Jen sings in Tyler's band, Funeral Goose, she gets caught up in the excitement and creates an awkward situation for him.; In "Story Two: Hello Donna, My New Friend", Heather becomes jealous of Joan's friendship with a college writing course classmate, Donna (Emily Chang).; In "Story Three: Silent Auction", Matt donates one of his paintings to a silent auction for Tim's medical charity.; In "Story Four: Beer Buddies", John and Greg decide to brew beer together.
| 56 | 12 | "Toilet Shaving Stuck Fertility" | Eric Dean Seaton | Max Saltarelli | February 1, 2018 | 3AYG12 | 7.11 |
In "Story One: John's John", after the Hughes family moves from John and Joan's home back into their own repaired home, a delivery mix-up results in John and Joan accidentally receiving the fancy Japanese toilet Tim ordered for himself.; In "Story Two: A Close Shave", Sophia decides to shave her legs.; In "Story Three: Jen and Greg Don't Want to Party", when Greg and Jen's crazy next-door neighbors invite them to a party, Greg makes up a lie so they can get out of attending.; In "Story Four: Hair Today, Pregnant Tomorrow", Matt and Colleen discover they need to give up some medications (for hair and for mood) to increase their chances of having a child.
| 57 | 13 | "Therapy Cheating Shoes Movie" | Natalia Anderson | Brad Copeland | March 1, 2018 | 3AYG13 | 6.49 |
In "Story One: Joan Vents", with John's help, Tyler listens in on a therapy session between Clementine and Joan to see if she still has feelings for him. Tyler and Clementine get back together.; In "Story Two: Too Cool for Traffic School", Tim bribes Samantha to attend online traffic school in his place.; In "Story Three: Greg's Ride", when Matt drives Greg to a job interview, they encounter a few bizarre obstacles that jeopardize getting him there on time.; In "Story Four: Let's Get Out of the Movies", Jen tries to convince Colleen and Tim to join her boycott of family get-togethers.
| 58 | 14 | "Parents Ancestry Coupon Chaperone" | Linda Mendoza | Barbara Adler | March 8, 2018 | 3AYG14 | 6.72 |
In "Story One: Jen's Parents", Jen and Greg decide to take turns dealing with her annoying parents, Dr. Dave Collins (Fred Melamed) and Charlotte Collins (Joanna Cassidy), when they come to visit.; In "Story Two: When Junious Met Wandy", Sophia digs up disturbing information when she investigates the family lineage.; In "Story Three: Coupon War", Colleen cashes in the many "love coupons" Matt has given her as gifts over the years.; In "Story Four: Promcom", when Tim and Heather chaperone Samantha's dance, Heather runs into an old flame, Wayne Winger (Brian Van Holt).
| 59 | 15 | "Graffiti Cute Jewelry Shots" | Melissa Kosar | Jordan Young | March 29, 2018 | 3AYG15 | 6.13 |
In "Story One: Greg's New Job", Greg tries to fit in with his new young coworkers but takes things too far.; In "Story Two: The Cute One", when Sophia feels like she is no longer the cutest kid in the Short family, she tries frantically to regain her status.; In "Story Three: The Necklace", Joan gives Jen a beautiful necklace, forgetting she already gave it to Heather for her Sweet 16, and now she has to get it back.; In "Story Four: Tim and Colleen Do Shots", Colleen and Tim bond when he helps her administer the hormone injections for her IVF treatment.
| 60 | 16 | "Pageant Bike Animals Jerky" | Jonathan Judge | Dave Jesser & Matt Silverstein | April 5, 2018 | 3AYG16 | 6.09 |
In "Story One: Pageant", Colleen babysits Lark, and Jen comes home to find Lark dolled up in Colleen's old pageant dress.; In "Story Two: Joan's Bike", Joan's bike is stolen from the driveway so she enlists Matt, Greg and Tim to join her in tracking it down.; In "Story Three: Avenue Hughes The Musical", when Heather tells Sophia she has to get rid of her stuffed animals, Sophia stages a musical with them to see if she can change her mother's mind.; In "Story Four: Jerky", Tyler and Clementine get John's help to sell their homemade beef jerky at the farmer's market.
| 61 | 17 | "Sitter Dating Sister Mattress" | Alex Reid | Elizabeth Tippet | April 12, 2018 | 3AYG17 | 6.48 |
In "Story One: Sitter Search", Jen and Greg go to great lengths to find the perfect babysitter for Lark.; In "Story Two: Everybody Loves Ryan", Heather learns information about Samantha's boyfriend that she isn't sure she should reveal.; In "Story Three: Surrogate Gate", Matt believes he may have a history with Colleen's sister after he meets her for the first time.; In "Story Four: Last Mattress", John becomes testy when shopping for a mattress and Joan realizes the unusual source of his aggravation.
| 62 | 18 | "Portrait Plagiarism Renter Scam" | Beth McCarthy-Miller | Maggie Mull | April 19, 2018 | 3AYG18 | 6.29 |
In "Story One: Tiny House Airbnb", Tyler and Clementine advertise their tiny house as a rental property.; In "Story Two: Portrait Of The Jen As A Woman", when Jen is offered a custom painting as payment from a hot new artist, she is thrilled until she sees the final product.; In "Story Three: Story Thief", Sophia repeats to Matt and Colleen her friend's story idea, which they try to use for a children's book but it isn't a new concept.; In "Story Four: The IRS", John and Joan fall prey to a sleazy "send me money now" phone scam.
| 63 | 19 | "#TBT: House Destiny Introduction Retirement" | Chad Lowe | Sarah Tapscott | April 26, 2018 | 3AYG19 | 6.22 |
A #TBT (Throwback Thursday) episode reveals some of the Short family's history: In "Story One: #TBT Jen and Greg Buy a House" (2010): When Jen and Greg bought their dream home.; In "Story Two: #TBT The Mattchelor" (2015): When Matt got sidetracked after he saw Colleen while waiting for a blind date.; In "Story Three: #TBT Tim Meets the Family" (1997): When Tim met Heather's family for the first time.; In "Story Four: #TBT John’s Final Destination” (2006): John's last airplane flight before retiring.
| 64 | 20 | "Lingerie Cookbook Gamble Surrogate" | Jude Weng | Joe Cristalli | May 3, 2018 | 3AYG20 | 6.25 |
In "Story One: Tim and Tyler's Secret", Tyler and Tim realize they are in over their heads when Heather tasks them with buying a bra for Samantha.; In "Story Two: Jen Gives Joan Crabs", Joan asks Jen to submit a recipe for the family cookbook, prompting Jen to steal one from her favorite restaurant.; In "Story Three: John's Gamble", John gets Samantha and Sophia hooked on gambling while babysitting for them.; In "Story Four: Wombmate", Colleen and Matt obsess about their surrogate's unhealthy lifestyle.
| 65 | 21 | "Video Piercing Model Hangover" | Jim Hensz | Kyle Mack | May 17, 2018 | 3AYG21 | 5.56 |
In "Story One: No Thank Yous", Colleen and Matt send out a video thank you message for their wedding gifts, which irritates the family.; In "Story Two: Sophia's Smarter Than You", Sophia wants a second piercing in her ear much to the dismay of Heather and Tim.; In "Story Three: Model Senior Citizen", John takes a modeling job but is horrified when his image is used to endorse a product for the elderly.; In "Story Four: Jen and Tonic", Jen and Greg learn that Lark can help out around the house.
| 66 | 22 | "Sixteen Spanish Car Leak" | Justin Adler | Justin Adler | May 17, 2018 | 3AYG22 | 4.95 |
In "Story One: Sweet Sixteen", Tim and Heather plan a surprise birthday party for Samantha, but the night takes an unexpected turn when Samantha doesn't come home alone.; In "Story Two: John and Joan en Español", John and Joan learn Spanish for their next adventure.; In "Story Three: Maybe Baby", Matt and Colleen having Colleen's half-sister as surrogate fails.; In "Story Four: Lark's Secret", Jen and Greg try to keep their secret (Jen's pregnancy) from the rest of the family.

=== Season 4 (2019) ===
| No. overall | No. in season | Title | Directed by | Written by | Original release date | Prod. code | U.S. viewers (millions) |
|---|---|---|---|---|---|---|---|
| 67 | 1 | "Jungle Push Resort Anniversary" | Jonathan Judge | Justin Adler | April 18, 2019 | 4AYG01 | 6.73 |
In "Story One: Welcome to the Jungle", the Short family arrives at the vacation resort in the Yucatan to celebrate the 50th anniversary of John and Joan, but the accommodations are terrible.; In "Story Two: Be My Little Baby", Heather doesn't let Sophia do the fun family activities with her siblings. Instead, she persuades her to do a mother/daughter fashion show.; In "Story Three: Colleen's Last Resort", Matt and Colleen spend their night at the fancy hotel secretly, which irritate the others.; In "Story Four: Fifty Short Years", John and Joan get lost in the jungle after they are separated from the tour guide.
| 68 | 2 | "Demo Nosebreath Surgery Match" | Justin Adler | Barbara Adler | April 18, 2019 | 4AYG02 | 5.02 |
In "Story One: Funeral For A Goose", Tyler feels bad about playing music after recording a demo that Tim paid for at a studio.; In "Story Two: Rough Pregnancy", Jen is feeling uncomfortable with her pregnancy, which also affects Greg.; In "Story Three: Good Care", Heather helps John with "his housekeeping" while Joan recovers from knee surgery.; In "Story Four: Meet the Parents", Matt and Colleen must compete against a wealthy couple in order to impress a potential birth mother, Morgan (Joey King).
| 69 | 3 | "Misery Turd Name Pills" | Jim Hensz | Jason Belleville | April 25, 2019 | 4AYG03 | 5.69 |
In "Story One: Broken Mom-Mom", while Joan is bedridden recovering from surgery, she persuades Sophia to spend time with her. In the end, she regrets it.; In "Story Two: Birth Mama Drama", Matt and Colleen invite the family to dinner for them to get to know the birth mother, Morgan.; In "Story Three: The Name Game", Greg and Jen select a name for their new baby, only to learn that Matt and Colleen also chose the same one.; In "Story Four: Heather's Business", Heather starts a new business named "Feel-Betters" making bottled placebo pills for mothers to give to their children, which she closes down after learning about the legal landmines.
| 70 | 4 | "Birth Meddling Jacket Denial" | Natalia Anderson | Ilana Wernick | May 2, 2019 | 4AYG04 | 5.58 |
In "Story One: Home Birth", when Morgan will prohibit anyone into the delivery room for the birth of her baby, Matt and Colleen convince her to give birth at home.; In "Story Two: Friend Fight", Heather is anxious after Samantha got along again with Jenna (Ashley Wolff), a friend who is a bad influence.; In "Story Three: Jen's Push Present", Jen is ecstatic after Greg bought her a gorgeous jacket, but actually it is for Joan.; In "Story Four: Denial", Tim keeps denying that he has a health problem, even though the doctor instructs him to go to the emergency room.
| 71 | 5 | "Sonogram Frog Rub Family" | Linda Mendoza | Jordan Young | May 9, 2019 | 4AYG05 | 5.59 |
In "Story One: The Telltale Sonogram", Greg and Jen don't want to know their baby's gender yet, later they change their mind.; In "Story Two: Michael Croaks", Sophia and her siblings have a hard time to kill their dangerous new pet frog.; In "Story Three: Tim's New Lease on Life", Tim becomes super clingy after having a heart attack, however it annoys the entire family.; In "Story Four: Finish Line", Matt and Colleen receive news that Morgan decides to keep her baby. Therefore, they plan to adopt a boy named Lucas (Vivaan Bisoi).
| 72 | 6 | "Recovery Discipline Psycho Labor" | Chad Lowe | Brad Copeland | May 23, 2019 | 4AYG06 | 4.48 |
In "Story One: Walkabout", Tim invites Joan for walk together while both recovering from health problems.; In "Story Two: Lucas Does the Dougie", Matt and Colleen try to shield Lucas, whom is now adopted, from Dougie's terrible habits.; In "Story Three: John's New Friend", John befriends the janitor at Sophia's school, Mr. Sissel (Biff Wiff), but later knows that Sophia and her siblings and friends have a childish rumor about him.; In "Story Four: Lark's Birthday", Jen is desperate to not go into childbirth during Lark's birthday party, so she and Greg manage to speed up the party.
| 73 | 7 | "Lost Math Art Glam" | Melissa Kosar | Danielle Hoover & David Monahan | May 30, 2019 | 4AYG07 | 4.80 |
In "Story One: A Family of Four", Greg loses Lark while visiting Jen and Talia, their newborn baby, at the hospital.; In "Story Two: New Math", Heather is determined to help Sophia in finishing her math homework, but can't figure out how to solve it.; In "Story Three: Art Rocks", Matt thinks Lucas is interested in art, so they enroll in a father/son art class.; In "Story Four: Hostile Makeover", Colleen organizes a family photo shoot and dresses Joan up.
| 74 | 8 | "X Box Glimpse Spotlight" | Natalia Anderson | Nadiya Chettiar | June 6, 2019 | 4AYG08 | 4.23 |
In "Story One: The X Text", when Heather and Tim get an emergency text from Samantha to pick her up at midnight, they hide their edginess thus she thinks they are "cool" parents.; In "Story Two: The Box", Tim is forced to hold his defecation while trapped inside the box during a circus.; In "Story Three: Decent Exposure", John accidentally walks in on Jen breastfeeding the baby. He can't forget it even after telling her.; In "Story Four: Spotlight", Greg and Matt get competitive over Lark and Lucas's talents.
| 75 | 9 | "Four Short Fairy Tales" | Eric Dean Stanton | Joe Cristalli | June 13, 2019 | 4AYG09 | 4.33 |
In "Story One: The Emperor's New Hair", the family attempts to hide their horrified and surprised reactions after seeing Tim wears a toupée.; In "Story Two: Jenderella", Jen fights for both face time with her boss and family time when she returns to work after maternity leave.; In "Story Three: The Joan Who Cried Wolf", Joan can't plan her retirement party due to the presence of rats in her house.; In "Story Four: Three Little Playhouses", Greg and Matt build a playhouse for their kids with John's assistance.
| 76 | 10 | "Letter Promise Adult Seventy" | Jay Karas | Kyle Mack | June 20, 2019 | 4AYG10 | 4.12 |
In "Story One: The Letter", Matt and Colleen treat Greg and Jen to a fancy dinner as a "thank you" for writing a recommendation letter to Lucas, but Greg and Jen are mortified because they never wrote it.; In "Story Two: The Pig Short", Sophia asks Heather and Tim to buy her a pig, but it is only a trick to get a cellphone.; In "Story Three: Ball Grown Up", Tim wants Tyler to get a medical check now that he is an adult.; In "Story Four: John's Divorce Dilemma", John's mom is dead before divorcing John's dad, Mort (Paul Dooley).
| 77 | 11 | "Clean Pens Grandma Guys" | Natalia Anderson | Max Saltarelli | June 20, 2019 | 4AYG11 | 3.56 |
In "Story One: Clean Start", Jen is furious because Edna (Mary Pat Gleason), the cleaning lady who has worked for John and Joan for years, cleans nothing.; In "Story Two: The Pen is Sexier Than the Sword", Heather, Matt, and Greg race to find the valuable souvenir pens John brought them when they were kids. John actually has those pens the whole time.; In "Story Three: Bad Grandma", Lucas is terrified of Joan whom looks just like an evil witch.; In "Story Four: Guys Night", Tim invites Matt to his house for a night party, but it turns out to be awkward.
| 78 | 12 | "Cabana Hero Action Son" | Justin Adler | Justin Adler | June 27, 2019 | 4AYG13 | 3.73 |
In "Story One: Cabana Boy", the family is super impressed to Matt after he helps Mort book a nice family trip to the Bahamas. Greg reserves a cabana at the pool to challenge Matt.; In "Story Two: I Can Be Your Hero", Tim saves Stuart (Richard Kind), a fellow hotel guest, from choking in a casino.; In "Story Three: Paradise", Matt and Colleen take an excursion to a private island after they spend an entire day in the casino.; In "Story Four: Mort's Secret", Mort announces that he has some more sons from his affair, one of them is Stuart, which shocks John.
| 79 | 13 | "Reverse Burden District Germany" | Alex Reid | Barbie Adler | June 27, 2019 | 4AYG12 | 3.38 |
In "Story One: We're Having a Baby", Heather and Tim realize that being grandparents is still far away, even though Tyler has been married for several years. They decide to have a fourth child.; In "Story Two: The Burden", Joan gets frustrated when she keeps getting tasked with watching and babysitting the grandchildren.; In "Story Three: Short Casa Su Casa", Greg and Jen search for a new house in a good school district.; In "Story Four: Mattoberfest", Matt gets a job offer in Germany. Unfortunately, he must go there alone. This forces him to choose between the job or Colleen and Lucas.

== Ratings ==
=== Season 1 ===
Viewership and ratings per episode of List of Life in Pieces episodes
| No. | Title | Air date | Rating/share (18–49) | Viewers (millions) |
|---|---|---|---|---|
| 1 | "Pilot" | September 21, 2015 | 2.6/9 | 11.28 |
| 2 | "Interruptus Date Breast Movin" | September 28, 2015 | 1.9/6 | 8.71 |
| 3 | "Sleepy Email Brunch Tree" | October 5, 2015 | 1.9/6 | 8.91 |
| 4 | "Prison Baby Golf Picking" | October 12, 2015 | 1.8/5 | 7.84 |
| 5 | "Babe Secret Phone Germs" | October 19, 2015 | 2.1/6 | 8.47 |
| 6 | "Ponzi Sex Paris Bounce" | November 5, 2015 | 1.9/6 | 7.88 |
| 7 | "Nanny Tent Earrings Cheeto" | November 12, 2015 | 1.8/6 | 7.99 |
| 8 | "Godparent Turkey Corn Farts" | November 19, 2015 | 1.8/6 | 8.35 |
| 9 | "Hospital Boudoir Time-Out Namaste" | November 26, 2015 | 2.1/7 | 7.61 |
| 10 | "Burn Vasectomy Milkshake Pong" | December 10, 2015 | 1.9/7 | 8.24 |
| 11 | "College Stealing Santa Caroling" | December 17, 2015 | 2.2/8 | 10.26 |
| 12 | "Bite Flight Wing-Man Bonnie" | January 7, 2016 | 2.1/7 | 9.27 |
| 13 | "Party Lobster Gym Sale" | January 14, 2016 | 2.0/6 | 9.15 |
| 14 | "Will Trash Book Spa" | January 21, 2016 | 2.0/6 | 8.78 |
| 15 | "Soccer Gigi TV Mikey" | February 4, 2016 | 2.2/7 | 9.09 |
| 16 | "Tattoo Valentine Guitar Pregnant" | February 11, 2016 | 2.1/7 | 9.35 |
| 17 | "Hair Recital Rainbow Mom" | February 18, 2016 | 2.1/7 | 9.34 |
| 18 | ""Sexting Mall Lemonade Heartbreak" | February 25, 2016 | 2.1/7 | 9.21 |
| 19 | "Pestilence War Famine Death" | March 3, 2016 | 1.8/6 | 8.40 |
| 20 | "Prank Assistant Gum Puppy" | March 10, 2016 | 2.0/7 | 8.55 |
| 21 | "Cinderella Fantasy Prom Dougie, Part 1" | March 31, 2016 | 1.7/6 | 7.23 |
| 22 | "Crytunes Divorce Tablet Ring, Part 2" | March 31, 2016 | 1.7/6 | 7.23 |

=== Season 2 ===
Viewership and ratings per episode of List of Life in Pieces episodes
| No. | Title | Air date | Rating/share (18–49) | Viewers (millions) |
|---|---|---|---|---|
| 1 | "Annulled Roommate Pill Shower" | October 27, 2016 | 1.4/5 | 5.96 |
| 2 | "Receptionist Pot Voting Cramp" | November 3, 2016 | 1.3/5 | 5.92 |
| 3 | "Eyebrow Anonymous Trapped Gem" | November 10, 2016 | 1.5/5 | 6.23 |
| 4 | "Cheap Promotion Flying Birthday" | November 17, 2016 | 1.4/5 | 6.65 |
| 5 | "Dinner Professor Steps Lesbian" | November 24, 2016 | 1.0/4 | 5.27 |
| 6 | "Boxing Opinion Spider Beard" | December 1, 2016 | 1.2/4 | 6.28 |
| 7 | "Swim Survivor Zen Talk" | December 8, 2016 | 1.3/4 | 6.45 |
| 8 | "Window Vanity Dress Grace" | December 15, 2016 | 1.3/5 | 6.94 |
| 9 | "#TBT: Y2K Sophia Honeymoon Critter" | January 5, 2017 | 1.4/5 | 6.71 |
| 10 | "Musical Motel Property Bingo" | January 12, 2017 | 1.2/4 | 5.95 |
| 11 | "Tailgate Spiral Souvenir Seating" | January 19, 2017 | 1.5/5 | 6.95 |
| 12 | "Best Waxing Grocery Rental" | February 2, 2017 | 1.3/4 | 6.62 |
| 13 | "Chef Rescue Negotiator Necklace" | February 9, 2017 | 1.3/4 | 6.08 |
| 14 | "Facebook Fish Planner Backstage" | February 16, 2017 | 1.3/5 | 6.33 |
| 15 | "Awkward Bra Automated Ordained" | February 23, 2017 | 1.2/5 | 5.98 |
| 16 | "Dirtbike Old Mechanic Earthquake" | March 9, 2017 | 1.3/5 | 6.13 |
| 17 | "Sleepover Dream Light Haze" | March 30, 2017 | 1.1/4 | 5.59 |
| 18 | "Favorite Vision Miguel Matchmaker" | April 6, 2017 | 1.2/5 | 5.68 |
| 19 | "Babysit Argument Invention Butterfly" | April 13, 2017 | 1.1/4 | 5.42 |
| 20 | "Ear Scorn Registry Manuscript" | April 27, 2017 | 1.1/4 | 5.51 |
| 21 | "Late Smuggling Dreambaby Voucher" | May 4, 2017 | 1.2/5 | 6.11 |
| 22 | "Poison Fire Teats Universe" | May 11, 2017 | 1.1/4 | 5.97 |

=== Season 3 ===
Viewership and ratings per episode of List of Life in Pieces episodes
| No. | Title | Air date | Rating/share (18–49) | Viewers (millions) |
|---|---|---|---|---|
| 1 | "Settlement Pacifier Attic Unsyncing" | November 2, 2017 | 1.2/5 | 6.67 |
| 2 | "Bunny Single Nightmare Drinking" | November 9, 2017 | 1.2/5 | 6.53 |
| 3 | "Treasure Ride Poker Hearing" | November 16, 2017 | 1.1/4 | 6.37 |
| 4 | "Testosterone Martyr Baked Knife" | November 23, 2017 | 1.3/5 | 5.93 |
| 5 | "Meal Potty Cart Middle" | November 30, 2017 | 1.1/4 | 6.57 |
| 6 | "Waffle Permission Kidless Boyfriend" | December 7, 2017 | 1.1/4 | 6.49 |
| 7 | "Thirty-Five Teacher Escape Lottery" | December 14, 2017 | 1.1/4 | 6.65 |
| 8 | "The Twelve Shorts of Christmas" | December 21, 2017 | 1.1/5 | 6.72 |
| 9 | "Reading Egg Nurse Neighbor" | January 4, 2018 | 1.3/5 | 7.43 |
| 10 | "Emergency Interview Driving Lunch" | January 11, 2018 | 1.2/5 | 7.18 |
| 11 | "Goose Friends Auction Fog" | January 18, 2018 | 1.2/5 | 6.79 |
| 12 | "Toilet Shaving Stuck Fertility" | February 1, 2018 | 1.2/5 | 7.11 |
| 13 | "Therapy Cheating Shoes Movie" | March 1, 2018 | 1.1/4 | 6.49 |
| 14 | "Parents Ancestry Coupon Chaperone" | March 8, 2018 | 1.2/5 | 6.72 |
| 15 | "Graffiti Cute Jewelry Shots" | March 29, 2018 | 1.0/4 | 6.13 |
| 16 | "Pageant Bike Animals Jerky" | April 5, 2018 | 0.9/4 | 6.09 |
| 17 | "Sitter Dating Sister Mattress" | April 12, 2018 | 1.1/4 | 6.48 |
| 18 | "Portrait Plagiarism Renter Scam" | April 19, 2018 | 1.0/4 | 6.29 |
| 19 | "#TBT: House Destiny Introduction Retirement" | April 26, 2018 | 1.0/4 | 6.22 |
| 20 | "Lingerie Cookbook Gamble Surrogate" | May 3, 2018 | 1.0/4 | 6.25 |
| 21 | "Video Piercing Model Hangover" | May 17, 2018 | 1.0/4 | 5.56 |
| 22 | "Sixteen Spanish Car Leak" | May 17, 2018 | 0.9/4 | 4.95 |

=== Season 4 ===
Viewership and ratings per episode of List of Life in Pieces episodes
| No. | Title | Air date | Rating/share (18–49) | Viewers (millions) | DVR (18–49) | DVR viewers (millions) | Total (18–49) | Total viewers (millions) |
|---|---|---|---|---|---|---|---|---|
| 1 | "Jungle Push Resort Anniversary" | April 18, 2019 | 1.0/5 | 6.73 | 0.5 | 1.62 | 1.5 | 8.35 |
| 2 | "Demo Nosebreath Surgery Match" | April 18, 2019 | 0.8/4 | 5.02 | 0.5 | 1.73 | 1.3 | 6.75 |
| 3 | "Misery Turd Name Pills" | April 25, 2019 | 0.8/4 | 5.69 | 0.3 | 1.56 | 1.1 | 7.22 |
| 4 | "Birth Meddling Jacket Denial" | May 2, 2019 | 0.8/4 | 5.58 | 0.4 | 1.65 | 1.2 | 7.23 |
| 5 | "Sonogram Frog Rub Family" | May 9, 2019 | 0.8/4 | 5.59 | 0.4 | 1.55 | 1.2 | 7.14 |
| 6 | "Recovery Discipline Psycho Labor" | May 23, 2019 | 0.6/3 | 4.48 | 0.4 | 1.57 | 1.0 | 5.97 |
| 7 | "Lost Math Art Glam" | May 30, 2019 | 0.7/3 | 4.80 | 0.3 | 1.49 | 1.0 | 6.30 |
| 8 | "X Box Glimpse Spotlight" | June 6, 2019 | 0.6/3 | 4.23 | 0.4 | 1.53 | 1.0 | 5.76 |
| 9 | "Four Short Fairy Tales" | June 13, 2019 | 0.6/3 | 4.33 | 0.4 | 1.50 | 1.0 | 5.83 |
| 10 | "Letter Promise Adult Seventy" | June 20, 2019 | 0.6/4 | 4.12 | 0.4 | 1.29 | 1.0 | 5.40 |
| 11 | "Clean Pens Grandma Guys" | June 20, 2019 | 0.5/3 | 3.56 | 0.4 | 1.48 | 0.9 | 5.05 |
| 12 | "Cabana Hero Action Son" | June 27, 2019 | 0.6/3 | 3.73 | 0.3 | 1.36 | 0.9 | 5.09 |
| 13 | "Reverse Burden District Germany" | June 27, 2019 | 0.5/3 | 3.38 | 0.4 | 1.43 | 0.9 | 4.81 |
