= Belle Knox =

American pornographic film actress

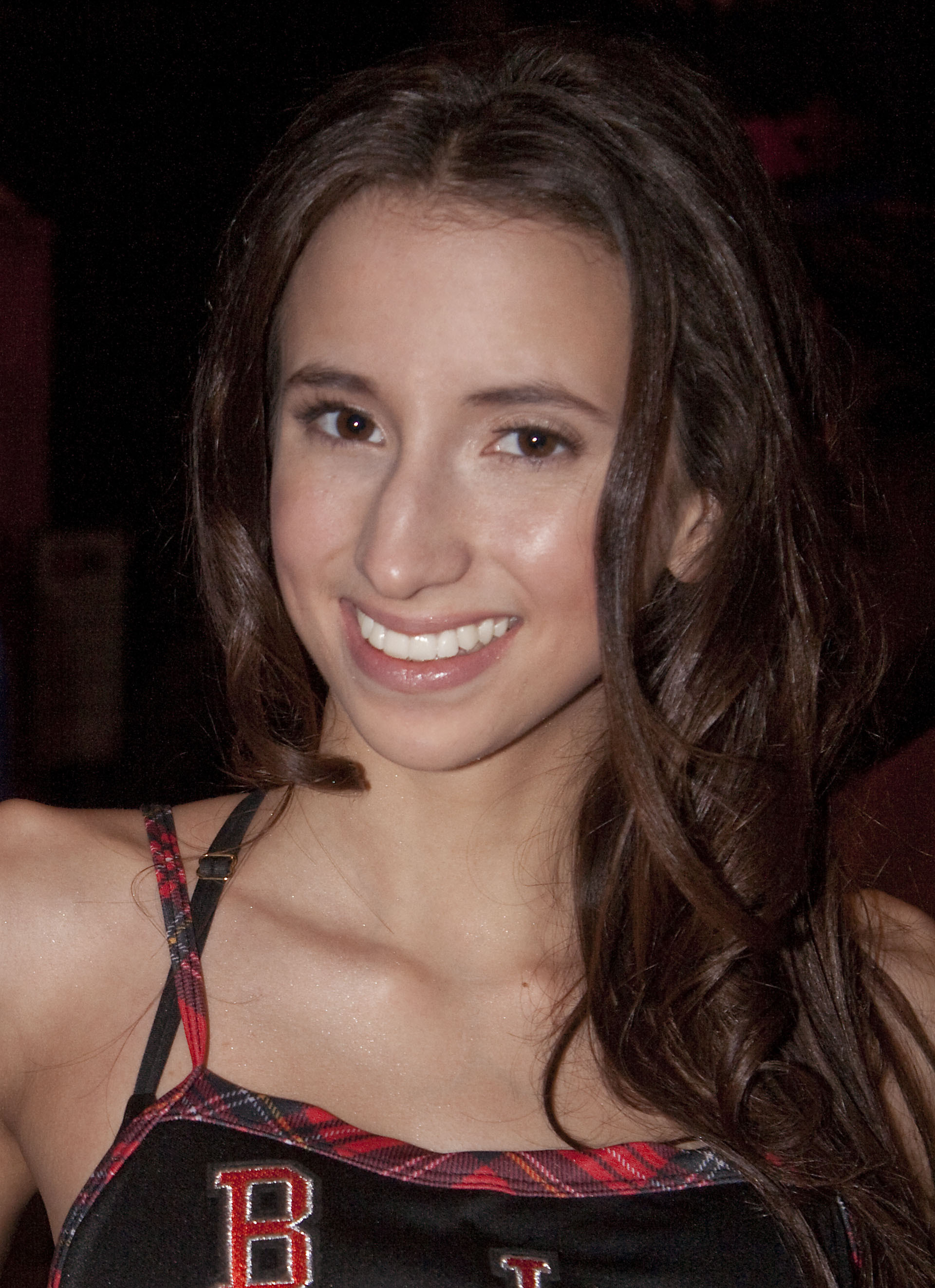
- Knox in 2014
- Born: 1995 or 1996 (age 30–31)
- Other name: Miriam Weeks
- Education: Duke University (BA)
- Occupation: Pornographic film actress
- Years active: 2013–2014

Miriam Weeks (born 1995 or 1996), known professionally as Belle Knox, is an American former pornographic film actress. She began performing in pornography in 2013 to help pay for tuition while studying at Duke University. In late 2013, Weeks' career became publicly known on campus, and she faced extensive in-person and online harassment.

Knox has won a 2014 Fanny Award and a 2015 XBIZ Award. Knox has publicly defended her decision to do the work, as well as explained her views of feminism and rights for sex workers. She believes her experiences are indicative of the rising costs of higher education in the United States.

== Career ==
Knox decided to enter the pornography industry because she enjoyed sex and pornography, and the job offered much better compensation and working hours. In previous work as a waitress, Knox had a boss who treated her poorly and a schedule that interfered with her studies, and was paid less than $400 a month (after taxes). She reasoned that pornography would allow her to control her schedule, and she could make about $1,300 per scene. Knox had previously tried to apply for government student loans but was told that she was ineligible, and believed private student loans would "strap her family with debt".

Knox began working in pornography in November 2013, flying to Los Angeles while on school breaks to perform in films. Knox chose the name "Belle", inspired by Belle from Beauty and the Beast and the character of Hannah Baxter (whose alter ego was named Belle) from Secret Diary of a Call Girl; she took the name "Knox" in admiration of Amanda Knox, exonerated in the murder of Meredith Kercher. In early 2015, Knox declined to comment on whether she was still filming adult movies.

== Political activism ==
In 2014, Weeks said that she was a College Republican and considered herself a sex-positive feminist and libertarian. In 2015, she identified her "favorite figures in liberty" as Ayn Rand, economist Milton Friedman, and two other activists whose careers included both sex and politics: porn actress Nina Hartley and former call girl Maggie McNeill. She also showed admiration for both former Representative Ron Paul and his son Senator Rand Paul.

Knox was involved in the organization Students for Liberty, an organization that bills itself as "the largest libertarian student organization in the world", and was the campus coordinator for Students for Liberty at Duke. In addition to her work with Students for Liberty, Weeks said she was appointed to the national board of directors for the Sex Workers Outreach Project. Knox had been asked to speak in Duke classes about being a sex worker, and gave speeches at other colleges besides her alma mater. While her work in porn helped fuel her political beliefs, Weeks said that she began developing her ideology earlier in life. In 2015, she said, "I grew up Catholic, so I grew up in a very, very, conservative background and that, I think, really was kind of the impetus for why I wanted to become a libertarian. I was always being told to cover up my body and I was always being told to wait until marriage to have sex, that my body would go down if I didn't wait till marriage to have sex", before adding, "That really made me become a libertarian and become a feminist."

== Outing and harassment ==
On January 10, 2014, a fellow Duke student, Thomas Bagley, revealed Knox's career to his fraternity brothers. Accounts of how he deduced Knox's identity vary: Bagley claims that Knox revealed her work to him as a secret, whereas Knox claims that Bagley recognized her from watching porn films in which she starred. The news spread quickly through the campus community. After returning to campus from winter vacation in early 2014, Knox discovered that her personal Facebook account had received more than 230 friend requests. Fellow students started following her porn persona's Twitter account, at which point she realized that her porn career had been discovered. Shortly thereafter, posts began to emerge on the anonymous college discussion board Collegiate ACB under the thread title "Freshman Pornstar". Knox began to receive threats of violence and death in person and via social media sites such as Twitter and Facebook. Some posters wanted Duke to expel Knox, while others endorsed raping and beating her. Knox took a college-sanctioned break from Duke in early 2014.

Knox felt that the public response exhibited a double standard that sex workers face from those who seek their services. In February 2014, Knox gave an interview to the campus newspaper The Chronicle, in which she used the pseudonym "Lauren A.", and referred to her stage name as "Aurora" to avoid identifying herself. She expressed frustration over her treatment stating, "I feel like girls at Duke have to hide their sexuality. We're caught in this virgin-whore dichotomy." Knox wrote on xoJane that the harassment continued; her identity, contact information, and location were posted online. When Knox contacted the police over the ongoing threats, she said the police failed to respond seriously to her concerns. On March 4, 2014, Knox decided to embrace her new reality, and wrote a second post where she revealed her stage name and reflected on her experiences. She later summarized her reasoning, "I think the [sex work] industry needs a feminist advocate as well."

=== Response ===
The Poynter Institute's Kelly McBride commented on the reception for Knox's story, stating that it "[presented] a lesson in crowd behavior", observing, "While her critics were loud and destructive, advocating that people call her dad to let him know his daughter is a porn star, no one suggested a phone campaign to inform the mother of the frat boy who outed her that her son is watching porn." According to critic and former sex worker Eric Barry, "It's impossible to separate those trying to violate sex workers' right to privacy, from those who believe sex workers somehow deserve to be devalued." Elizabeth Stoker, writing for The Week, said the "reprehensible and personal" threats and harassment through social media were "odious and inexcusable", and characterized them as unjustifiable, as well as being "disproportionately aimed at women in the public sphere". Stoker also found Knox's political agenda uncompelling because it emphasized personal freedom over quality of life. The sex industry does not have a trade union, and marketing towards male sexual desire incentivizes unsafe practices in the industry.

John Rogove wrote that the sex industry actually reduces freedom by transforming its actors from people into commodities. Eliana Dockterman, writing for Time, expressed doubts that Knox could truly find her pornography career empowering. According to Dockterman, Knox "doesn't know how to process her newfound fame" and her decision "will likely haunt [her] for the rest of her college and professional career".

A representative for Duke University issued a statement saying that while they would not comment on specific cases, the college's community standard did not have any restrictions concerning off-campus employment. Of Knox's allegations that campus police did not take the threats against her seriously enough, the representative remarked, "We are committed to protecting the privacy, safety and security of our students. Whenever we identify a student in need of support, we reach out to them and offer the many resources that we have available on campus to assist them."

== Media appearances and dramatizations ==
In May 2014, Knox announced that she would be hosting an online show called The Sex Factor along with four other porn performers, where they would oversee 16 contestants that would compete for the right to participate in a sex scene with Knox. A fictionalized version of Knox's story was featured in the 2014 Law & Order: Special Victims Unit episode "Pornstar's Requiem", with Hannah Marks playing a character loosely based on her. Knox was also the focus of the five-part documentary series Becoming Belle Knox, which was produced and released by Stateless Media and Conde Nast Entertainment. A TV docudrama based on her life titled From Straight A's to XXX premiered on the Lifetime network in February 2017, in which she was portrayed by Haley Pullos.

== Personal life ==
Knox's parents are Canadian and Punjabi Indian. As of 2014, Knox was pursuing a major in women's studies and sociology. She later became a women's rights activist. She told Rolling Stone in 2014 that she had been sexually assaulted in high school. She is bisexual.

== Awards and nominations ==
Year	Ceremony	Result	Category	Work
2014	Fanny Award	Won	New Girl on the Block (Female Newcomer of the Year)	—N/a
2015	AVN Award	Nominated	Best New Starlet	—N/a
2015	AVN Award	Nominated	Mainstream Star of the Year	—N/a
2015	XBIZ Award	Nominated	Best New Starlet	—N/a
2015	XBIZ Award	Nominated	Crossover Star of the Year	—N/a
2015	XBIZ Award	Nominated	Best Scene – All-Girl (with Lisa Ann & Nina Hartley)	Lisa Ann's School of MILF 2: The Education of Belle Knox
2015	XBIZ Award	Won	Marketing Campaign of the Year	—N/a
2015	XRCO Award	Nominated	Mainstream Adult Media Favorite	—N/a

== See also ==
- Kendra Sunderland – American pornographic film actress (born 1995)
- Pornography in the United States
- Sex worker movements
- Sex workers' rights
- Slut-shaming
- Student loans in the United States
