= Lauralee Bell =

American soap opera actress (born 1968)

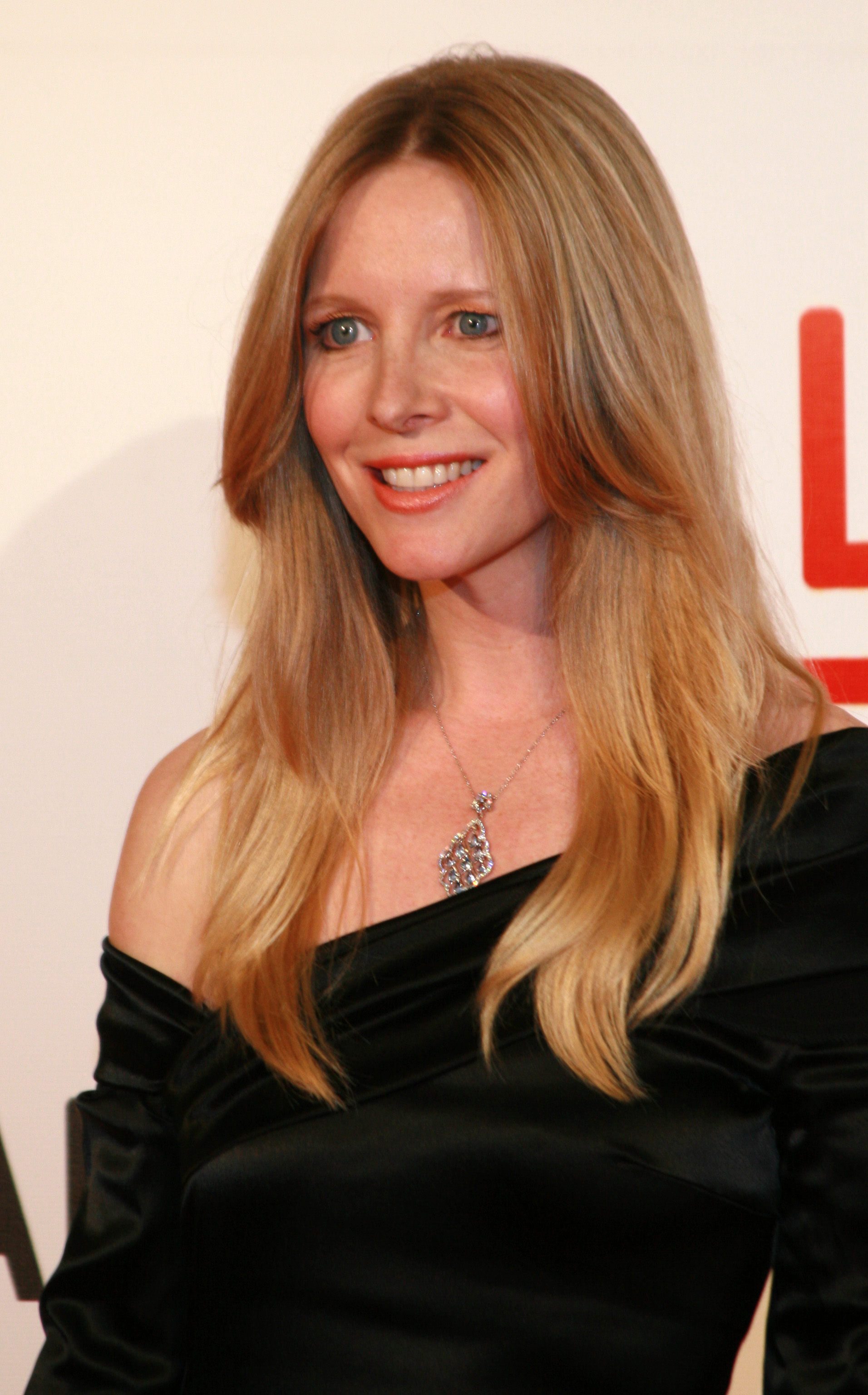
- Bell in 2008
- Born: Lauralee Kristen Bell; December 22, 1968 (age 57); Chicago, Illinois, U.S.
- Occupation: Actress
- Years active: 1970–present
- Spouse: Scott Martin (m. 1997)
- Children: 2
- Parent(s): William J. Bell; Lee Phillip Bell
- Relatives: Bradley Bell (brother)

Lauralee Kristen Bell (born December 22, 1968) is an American actress. She is best known for her portrayal of Christine Blair in the CBS daytime soap operas, The Young and the Restless and The Bold and the Beautiful. As a producer, she received the award for Outstanding Special Class Short Format Daytime at the 41st Daytime Creative Arts Emmy Awards for the short film mI promise.

== Life and career ==
Bell was born in Chicago, Illinois, and attended The Latin School of Chicago. The only daughter of soap opera creators William J. Bell and Lee Phillip Bell, and sister to Bill Bell, Jr. and Bradley Bell as well as sister-in-law to Maria Arena Bell and Colleen Bell. She was offered a bit role as a model, Christine "Cricket" Blair, on her parents' daytime soap opera The Young and the Restless in 1983 and that became a contract role in 1986.

Over time, her character matured from a model into a legal aid lawyer. Her character also dropped the childish moniker "Cricket", especially after her rival Phyllis (Michelle Stafford) turned it into an insult by calling her "the Bug." In 2001, Bell asked to be moved to recurring status after maternity leave, though she returned to regular status the following year. In 2005, she returned to recurring for another year. In 2007, the character was brought over to The Bold and the Beautiful by executive producer Bradley Bell, the actress' real-life brother, for a short-term stint, returning to The Young and the Restless in 2010, where she continues to make recurring appearances. Bell received Young Artist Award for Best Performance in a Daytime TV Series – Young Actress in 1989, the Soap Opera Digest Award for Outstanding Supporting Actress in 1999, and Daytime Emmy Awards nomination for Outstanding Supporting Actress in a Drama Series in 2016.

Bell guest-starred on prime time shows including Diagnosis: Murder, Walker, Texas Ranger, Pacific Blue, CSI: Miami and Castle. She made her film debut starring in the 2005 comedy Carpool Guy directed by Corbin Bernsen. The following year, she played the leading role in the Lifetime thriller film, Past Sins. She later starred in Deadly Expose (2017), Mistress Hunter (2018), and Nightmare Tenant (2018) which she also produced. In 2021, she played Daphne Dumas in V.C. Andrews' Ruby and Pearl in the Mist.

== Personal life ==
Bell married photographer Scott Martin on October 4, 1997. They have a son, Christian James Martin, born on January 17, 2001, and a daughter, Samantha Lee Martin, born on October 28, 2002. Lauralee co-owned a boutique, On Sunset, which closed in 2009.

== Filmography ==
Year	Title	Role	Notes
1983–2006, 2010–	The Young and the Restless	Christine Blair	Contract role: July 15, 1983 – January 24, 2005; Recurring role: March 9 – October 20, 2005; December 9, 2005 – January 4, 2006; March 15, 2006; May 26 – 31, 2006; August 23 – 28, 2006; July 15, 2010 – present Young Artist Award for Best Performance in a Daytime TV Series – Young Actress (1989); Soap Opera Digest Award for Outstanding Supporting Actress (1999); Nominated — Daytime Emmy Award for Outstanding Supporting Actress in a Drama Series (2016); Nominated — Young Artist Award for Best Performance in a Daytime TV Series – Young Actress (1987); Nominated — Soap Opera Digest Awards for Outstanding Younger Lead Actress (1996, 1998)
1995	Diagnosis: Murder	Herself	Episode: "Death in the Daytime"
1998	Walker, Texas Ranger	Kim Rivers	Episodes: "The Wedding: Part 1" and "The Wedding: Part 2"
1999	Pacific Blue	Christine	Episode: "Trust"
2005	Carpool Guy	Hope	
2006	Past Sins	Donna Erickson	Television film
2006	CSI: Miami	Alissa Valone	Episode: "Curse of the Coffin"
2007	The Bold and the Beautiful	Christine Blair	June 12 – 21, 2007
2008	Just Ask Mike	Brenda	Television film
2009	Family Dinner	Karen O'Connell	
2012	Easy Rider: The Ride Back	Anne Williams	
2012	Castle	Pam Francis	Episode: "A Dance with Death"
2013	mI promise	Kate	Short film Daytime Emmy Award for Outstanding Special Class Short Format Daytime
2017	Deadly Expose	Sarah Bergson	
2018	Mistress Hunter	Jackie	Television film, also executive producer
2018	Nightmare Tenant	Dr. Carol Allen	Television film, also executive producer
2021	Ruby	Daphne Dumas	Television film
2021	Pearl in the Mist	Daphne Dumas	Television film
