= The Gray Man (2007 film) =

- Directed by: Scott Flynn
- Written by: Lee Fontanella; Colleen Cochran
- Produced by: Aaron Osborne
- Starring: Patrick Bauchau; Jack Conley; John Aylward; Jillian Armenante; Silas Weir Mitchell; Vyto Ruginis; Mollie Milligan; Lexi Ainsworth; Shaun Senter; Ben Hall
- Cinematography: David Rudd
- Edited by: George Folsey Jr. John Sitter; Brad E. Wilhite
- Music by: Justin Caine Burnett
- Distributed by: RavenWolf Films
- Release date: August 31, 2007 (WFF)
- Running time: 96 minutes
- Country: United States
- Language: English

The Gray Man (previously known as Wysteria: The Horrible Story of Albert Fish) is a 2007 biographical thriller film based on the actual life and events of American serial killer, rapist and cannibal Albert Fish. It premiered at the Montreal World Film Festival on August 31, 2007, and was scheduled for a theatrical release sometime in 2007. It is directed by Scott Flynn and stars Belgian actor Patrick Bauchau as Albert Fish.

== Plot ==
At St. John's Orphanage in 1877, children, including a young Albert Fish, are being paddled as punishment for their sins. Albert Fish as an adult (Patrick Bauchau) then tells of a horse that some older boys at the orphanage set on fire, comparing himself to the horse. He regularly whips himself with a belt while hallucinating himself as he appeared in the orphanage. Fish kills a boy scout, Francis McDonnell, before visiting the Budd family home, where he abducts and murders ten-year-old Grace Budd (Lexi Ainsworth) on June 3, 1928, under the pretense of taking her to his niece's birthday party.

Throughout the film is a film noir-style narration by Detective William King (Jack Conley), of the Missing Persons Bureau. King searches for Grace Budd for six years before finally tracking down and arresting Fish.

Fish is found guilty despite evidence of his insanity and promptly sentenced to die.

== Cast ==
- Patrick Bauchau as Albert Fish
- Jack Conley as Det. Will King
- John Aylward as Captain Ayers
- Jillian Armenante as Delia Budd
- Silas Weir Mitchell as Albert Fish Jr.
- Vyto Ruginis as Detective Maher
- Mollie Milligan as Gertrude
- Lexi Ainsworth as Grace Budd
- Shaun Senter as Pale Boy
- Ben Hall as Albert Budd
- Shawn Jefferson as Officer MacDonald

== Reception ==
Variety's Dennis Harvey wrote, "A chilling turn by Patrick Bauchau as Albert Fish, the seemingly harmless old gent exposed in 1934 as a serial child murderer, dominates The Gray Man. Skirting graphic horror terrain for a less sensational character study/detective-procedural, helmer Scott Flynn's debut feature manages to be just moderately compelling despite the grotesque subject. Cable and DVD sales are signaled."
