= Lexi Ainsworth =

American actress (born 1992)

- Born: Alexandra Danielle Ainsworth; October 28, 1992 (age 33); Oklahoma City, Oklahoma, U.S.
- Occupation: Actress
- Years active: 2005–present

Alexandra Danielle Ainsworth (born October 28, 1992) is an American actress. She is best known for playing the role of Kristina Davis on General Hospital, off and on from 2009 to 2023. She won a Daytime Emmy Award for Outstanding Younger Actress for her role on General Hospital in 2017. She also received a nomination in the same category in 2011.

== Early life ==
Ainsworth was born in Oklahoma City, Oklahoma. Her father is a dentist and her mother is a school teacher. While she was growing up, her family hosted over a dozen foreign exchange students. She began dancing with a local ballet company at age six. This led to her appearing in several theater productions, including The Wizard of Oz (as a munchkin) and To Kill a Mockingbird (as Scout).

Ainsworth was mostly home-schooled.

== Career ==
After attending acting camps in New York City and Los Angeles, Ainsworth landed a national commercial for Barbie dolls. After several more commercials, she guest starred on Medical Investigation and Gilmore Girls. She then appeared in a short film, Caroline Crossing. From 2007 to 2008, Ainsworth landed roles in the feature films The Gray Man and Wild Child, as well as a guest appearance on iCarly.

In June 2009, she joined the cast of General Hospital as Kristina Davis. She received a Daytime Emmy Award nomination for Outstanding Younger Actress in 2011. In October 2011, it was announced that Ainsworth had been released from her contract.

In 2011, she starred in a short film, Nice Guys Finish Last, directed by her General Hospital castmate, Kimberly McCullough. From 2012 to 2014, Ainsworth appeared in the Lifetime TV Movie Death Clique and starred in an unaired pilot, Westside. She guest-starred on Cougar Town and Criminal Minds, and appeared in a recurring role as Cassidy on Chosen. Ainsworth starred as Ashley in the film So This is Christmas, co-starring with Eric Roberts and Vivica A. Fox. She co-starred with Evan Hofer in a short film, My Friend Jenkins.

She returned to the role of Kristina Davis on General Hospital in 2015. Ainsworth played Jessica Burns, a high schooler driven to the point of suicide by bullying, in the found-footage film A Girl Like Her. She guest starred on IZombie, Teen Wolf, and Rizzoli & Isles. Ainsworth starred in a music video for Loose, a song by the band Smoke Season.

In 2017, Ainsworth landed a recurring role on Major Crimes. Soon after, it was announced that she would be leaving General Hospital. She won a 2017 Daytime Emmy Award for Outstanding Younger Actress in a Drama Series for her role as Kristina on GH. She returned to General Hospital in 2018.

Ainsworth guest starred on the anthology comedy series The Guest Book in 2018. She played Bethany in the 2020 Lifetime TV Movie Obsession: Her Final Vengeance and guest starred on Shameless.

In May 2023, it was announced that Ainsworth had been dismissed from General Hospital. The role of Kristina Davis was recast with Kate Mansi. Since leaving GH, Ainsworth has guest-starred on NCIS. She had plans to produce and act in a film, Masterpiece, which was delayed due to the SAG-AFTRA strike.

== Filmography ==
=== Film ===
Year	Title	Role	Notes
2006	Caroline Crossing	Caroline Price	Short film
2007	The Gray Man	Grace Budd	Previously known as Wisteria: The Horrible Story of Albert Fish
2008	Wild Child	Molly Moore	
2011	Nice Guys Finish Last	Young Kori	Short film
2013	So This Is Christmas	Ashley	
2014	My Friend Jenkins	Teenage Lucy	Short film
2015	A Girl Like Her	Jessica Burns	Previously known as The Bully Chronicles

=== Television ===
Year	Title	Role	Notes
2005	Medical Investigation	Kaitlin Ronson	Episode: "Survivor"
2005	Gilmore Girls	Tillie	Episodes: "Let Me Hear Your Balalaikas Ringing Out", "Just Like Gwen and Gavin"
2007	iCarly	Lexi	Episode: "iLike Jake"
2009–2011, 2015–2023	General Hospital	Kristina Davis	Contract role
2012	Criminal Minds	Abby Miller	Episode: "I Love You, Tommy Brown"
2013	Cougar Town	Young Girl	Episode: "Saving Grace"
2013	Westside	Nico Carver	Unaired pilot
2014	Chosen	Cassidy	4 episodes
2014	Death Clique	Sara Cowan	Television film
2015	iZombie	Tate	Episode: "Dead Rat, Live Rat, Brown Rat, White Rat"
2015	Teen Wolf	Beth	Episode: "Lies of Omission"
2016	Rizzoli & Isles	Claire	Episode: "Shadow of Doubt"
2017–2018	Major Crimes	Ella	4 episodes
2018	The Guest Book	Tiffany	Episode: "Invisible Son"
2020	Shameless	Amber	Episode: "Go Home, Gentrifier!"
2020	Obsession: Her Final Vengeance	Bethany	Television film
2023	NCIS	Holly Lyngos	Episode: "Second Opinion"

== Awards and nominations ==
List of acting awards and nominations
Year	Award	Category	Title	Result	Ref.
2011	Daytime Emmy Award	Outstanding Younger Actress in a Drama Series	General Hospital	Nominated	
2011	Young Artist Award	Best Performance in a Daytime TV Series - Young Actress	General Hospital	Won	
2012	Young Artist Award	Best Performance in a Daytime TV Series - Young Actress	General Hospital	Nominated	
2017	Daytime Emmy Award	Outstanding Younger Actress in a Drama Series	General Hospital	Won	
