= Haley Pullos =

American actress (born 1998)

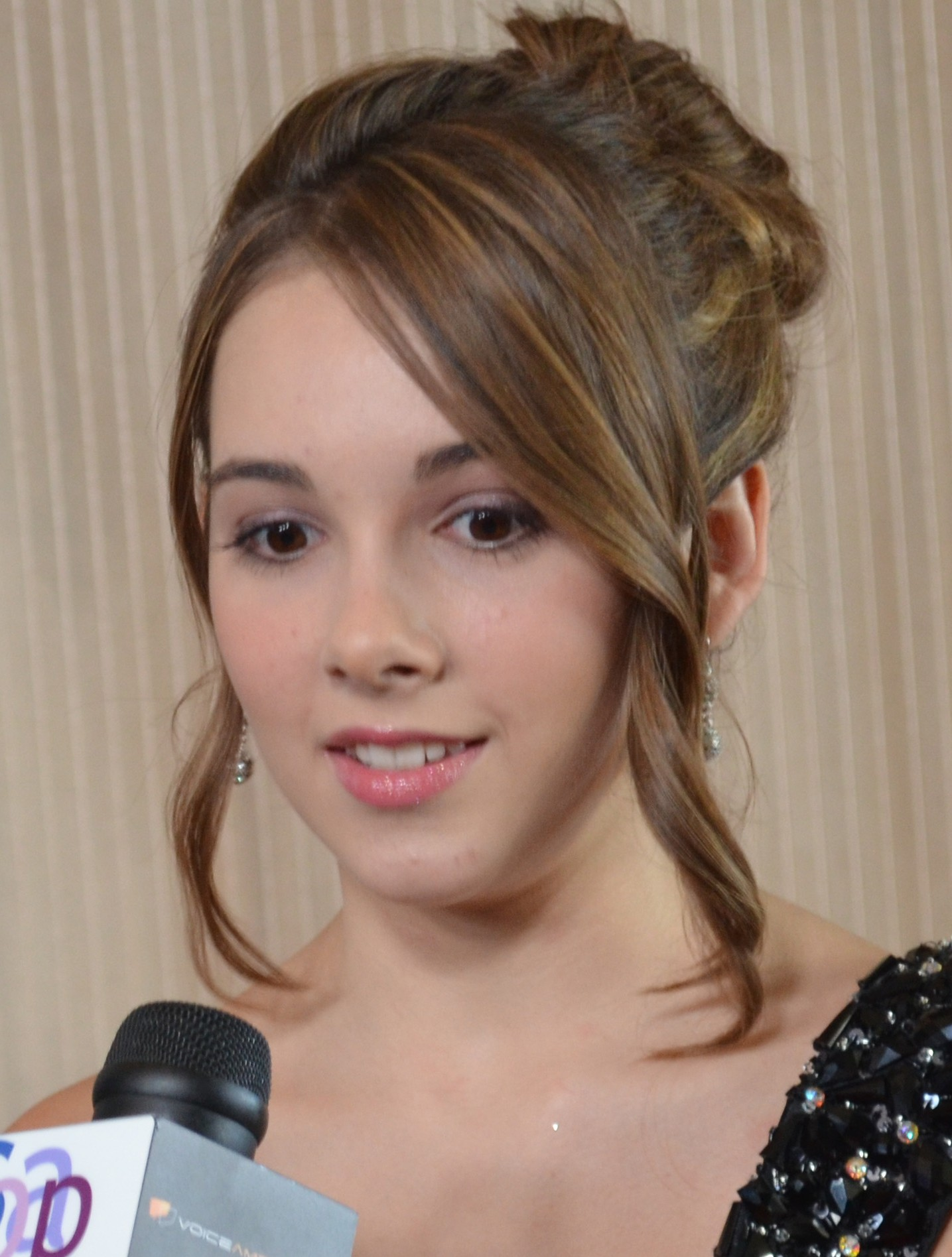
- Pullos at the Daytime Emmy Awards in 2012
- Born: Haley Alexis Pullos; July 10, 1998 (age 28); Palo Alto, California, United States
- Occupation: Actress
- Years active: 2002–present

Haley Alexis Pullos (born July 10, 1998) is an American actress best known for her role as Molly Lansing-Davis in the American daytime soap opera General Hospital. Pullos began her acting career as a child, appearing in several films and TV series before her rise to prominence for her role on General Hospital, for which she won several Young Artist Awards. She also guest starred in other TV series and played Bella Schmerz in The Expanding Universe of Ashley Garcia.

== Early life and career ==
Pullos was born in Palo Alto, California, on July 10, 1998. She was given Alexis as her middle name, and has two brothers and two sisters. A child actress, she played a patron in the 2002 movie Carney Tales and had a recurring role as Lansing-Davis on General Hospital, starting in July 2009, when she was 11. Earlier in 2007, she starred in 'Til Death and Moonlight. In 2008, Pullos had her first recurring television role on Ghost Whisperer, where she played a young Melinda (played by Jennifer Love Hewitt) in flashbacks, and also appeared in The Cleaner and The Middleman.

While appearing on General Hospital, Pullos made several guest appearances, including the pilot episode of Dollhouse, and appeared in the "Two Story" episode of House, for which she won a Young Artist Award. In 2009, she also appeared in Dead Air and Dark House, the former starring Corbin Bernsen and Jeanne Cooper, and it was announced she would appear in The Midnight Man (The Collector) and Montana Amazon, the latter starring Olympia Dukakis and Haley Joel Osment. In 2013, Pullos appeared in the ad "Little Tricks" for Yoplait. She subsequently appeared in TV commercials for L'Oreal, Burger King, and Walmart. In 2014, she guest starred in Growing Up Fisher. From 2016 to 2018, Pullos had a recurring role as Addison Pierce in Mr. Student Body President. In 2017, she starred as Belle Knox, a real-life college woman who entered the porn industry to pay her tuition, From Straight A's to XXX on Lifetime. Also in 2017, she starred as Lily Brooks in A Royal Christmas Ball on Ion Television.

In 2018, Pullos starred as Taryn McGivensin in Soronity Stalker (previously titled No Good Deed and alternatively Lethal Beauty) on Lifetime. Also in 2018, she guest starred in Scorpion, as well as in The Mick. In March 2019, GQ Italia placed Pullos fourth in its "sexiest 20-year-olds in the world" list. As of August 2019, she appeared in 402 episodes of General Hospital. In 2020, Pullos starred as Schmerz in The Expanding Universe of Ashley Garcia, a Latinx comedy on Netflix co-created by Mario Lopez of Access Hollywood and Friends producer Seth Kurland. In 2021, she had a main role as Elisa in Red Riding Hoods. In 2022, she guest starred in Mr. Mayor. In 2023, she appeared on God-ly. In May 2023, her role on General Hospital was recast, originally by Holiday Mia Kriegel, due to an automobile accident; she had appeared in almost 500 episodes of General Hospital since 2009. For her roles in General Hospital (2009–2023) and Instant Mom (2013–2015), she was nominated for the Daytime Emmy Awards, and won four Young Artist Awards (for her role on General Hospital), including three consecutive ones.

== Automobile accident, subsequent felony DUI arrest and conviction ==
On April 29, 2023, Pullos was involved in a road traffic collision, where she collided head-on with another vehicle whilst driving on the wrong side of an on-ramp to the 134 Freeway in Pasadena, California. Pullos had been involved in a previous hit-and-run incident in the run-up to the collision, and nearly collided with a further car prior to the crash. The driver of the other vehicle was hospitalised with reported life-threatening injuries but survived. According to police reports from the incident obtained by TMZ, firefighters rescued Pullos from her car, wherein she subsequently struck one firefighter who was assessing her injuries.

On May 11, 2023, it was announced Pullos' role on General Hospital had been recast as a result of the car accident. Pullos stated: "Unfortunately, I was involved in an automobile accident and I'm doing okay, but I am going to need a little time to recover. I will be back as soon as possible!" Six days later TMZ published reported excerpts from police reports of the crash; she was arrested for suspicion of driving under the influence (DUI), and was subsequently charged with two counts of felony DUI. Later that day, she entered into a rehab facility in Malibu, California.

In June 2023, Pullos was sued by the driver of the vehicle involved in the head-on collision. The lawsuit alleged that Pullos was "simultaneously intoxicated with marijuana and drunk on alcohol" when she had collided with the other driver. Officers found edible cannabis products and mini-bottles of tequila in Pullos' vehicle.

On April 29, 2024, Pullos was sentenced to 90 days in jail. She was released from jail on July 29, and sentenced to five years of probation, including 200 hours of community service, a nine-month alcohol program, a mental health treatment program, required to pay $8,260 in restitution to the victim, and not to drive a motor vehicle for at least a year. Her attorney Mark Daniel Melnick told People that "Haley is very grateful to the court for a minimum sentence and for recognizing her remorse and the strides she has made in her sobriety." General Hospital actress Nancy Lee Grahn defended Pullos after her sentence, writing on social media: "As Haley's TV mom I can tell some truth about her as I've loved her since she was a little girl. She made a HUGE mistake, knows it, owns it & has spent the last yr doing EVERYTHING imaginable to take responsibility 4 it." In October 2025, the civil lawsuit was settled for $1 million as part of an insurance payout by No Comment, a restaurant in Pasadena where Pullos was working the night of the accident, with "no admission of liability".

== Filmography ==
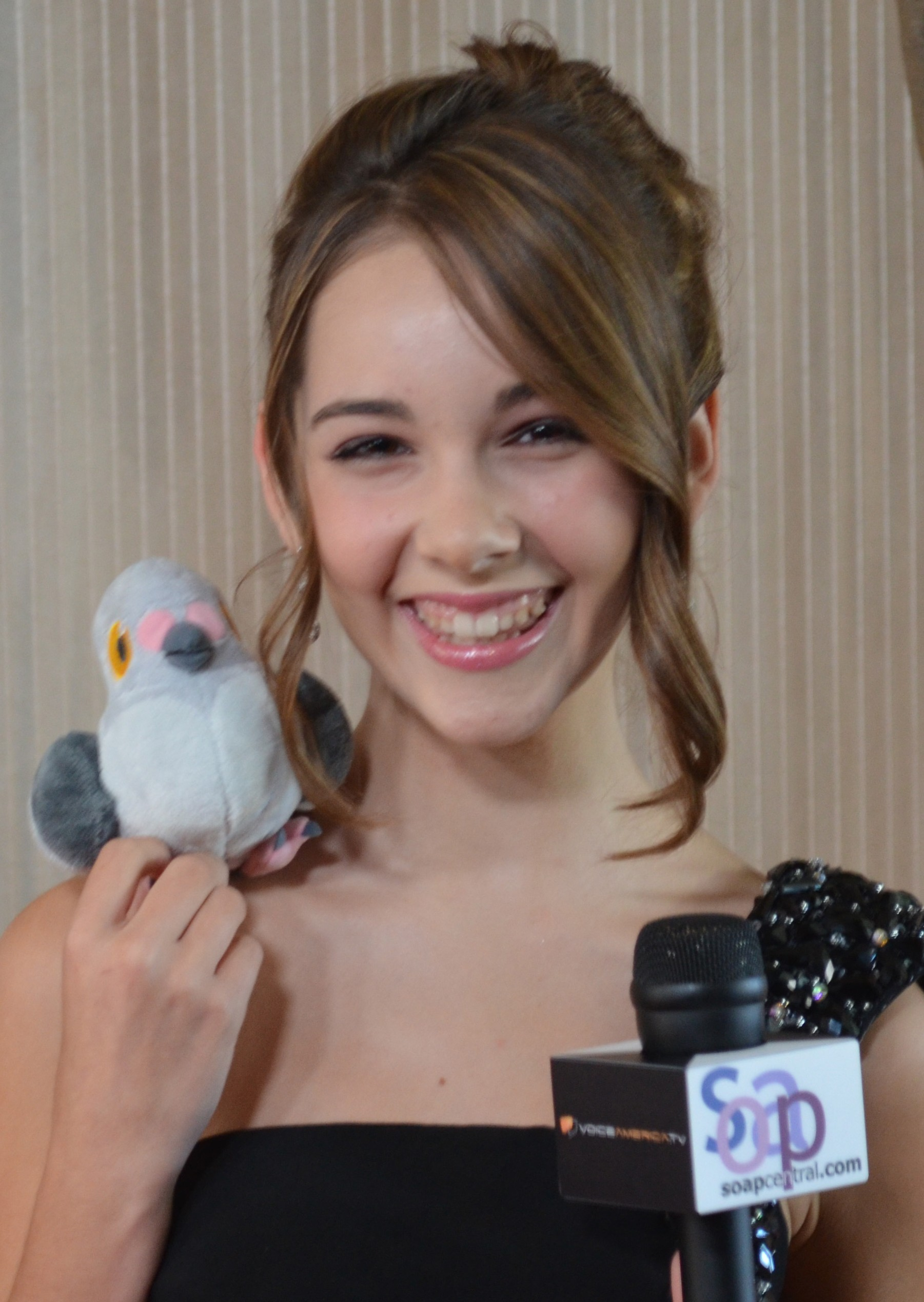
Pullos at the 39th Daytime Emmy Awards

=== Film ===
Year	Title	Role	Notes
2002	Carney Tales	Tiny girl	
2009	Dead Air	Dee Dee	
2009	The Collector	Cindy O'Brien	
2009	Dark House	Young Tammy	
2026	The Dating App Nightmare	Sarah	

=== Television ===
Year	Title	Role	Notes
2007	'Til Death	Student	
2007	Moonlight	Mara	
2008	Ghost Whisperer	Young Melinda	
2008	The Cleaner	Angelina	
2008	The Middleman	Little Wendy	
2009	Dollhouse	Davina Crestejo	Episode: "Ghost"
2009–2023	General Hospital	Molly Lansing-Davis	Recurring role
2011	House	Colleen	Episode: "Two Stories"
2013–2015	Instant Mom	Molly	
2014	Growing Up Fisher	Sophie	Episode: "Blind Man's Bluff"
2016–2018	Mr. Student Body President	Addison Pierce	Recurring role
2017	From Straight A's to XXX	Miriam Weeks/Belle Knox	Television film
2017	A Royal Christmas Ball	Lily Brooks	Television film
2018	Scorpion	Rachel	Episode: "Lighthouse of the Rising Sun"
2018	The Mick	Amanda	Episode: "The Accident"
2018	Good Deed	Taryn	Television film
2020	The Expanding Universe of Ashley Garcia	Bella Schmerz	Recurring role; 6 episodes
2021	Red Riding Hoods	Elisa	Main role; 10 episodes
2022	Mr. Mayor	Paula Logan	Episode: "The Recall"
2023	God-ly	Aphrodite	Episode: "King of the Castle P1"

== Awards and nominations ==
Award	Year	Category	Work	Result	Refs
Young Artist Award	2010	Best Performance in a TV Series – Recurring Young Actress	General Hospital	Won	
Young Artist Award	2011	Best Performance in a Daytime TV Series – Young Actress 12 and Under	General Hospital	Won	
Young Artist Award	2012	Best Performance in a Daytime TV Series – Young Actress	General Hospital	Won	
Young Artist Award	2012	Best Performance in a TV Series – Guest Starring Young Actress 11–13	House	Won	
Young Artist Award	2013	Best Performance in a Daytime TV Series	General Hospital	Nominated	
Young Artist Award	2014	Best Performance in a Daytime TV Series	General Hospital	Won	
Young Artist Award	2014	Best Performance in a TV Series	Instant Mom	Nominated	
Daytime Emmy Award	2015	Outstanding Younger Actress in a Drama Series	General Hospital	Nominated	

Preceded by Iris and Ivy Kaim	Molly Lansing actress 2009–2023	Succeeded by Holiday Mia Kriegel; Brooke Anne Smith; Kristen Vaganos
