= Young Artist Award for Best Performance in a Daytime TV Series – Young Actress =

Young Artist Awards

Young Artist Award for Best Young Actress in a Daytime TV Series
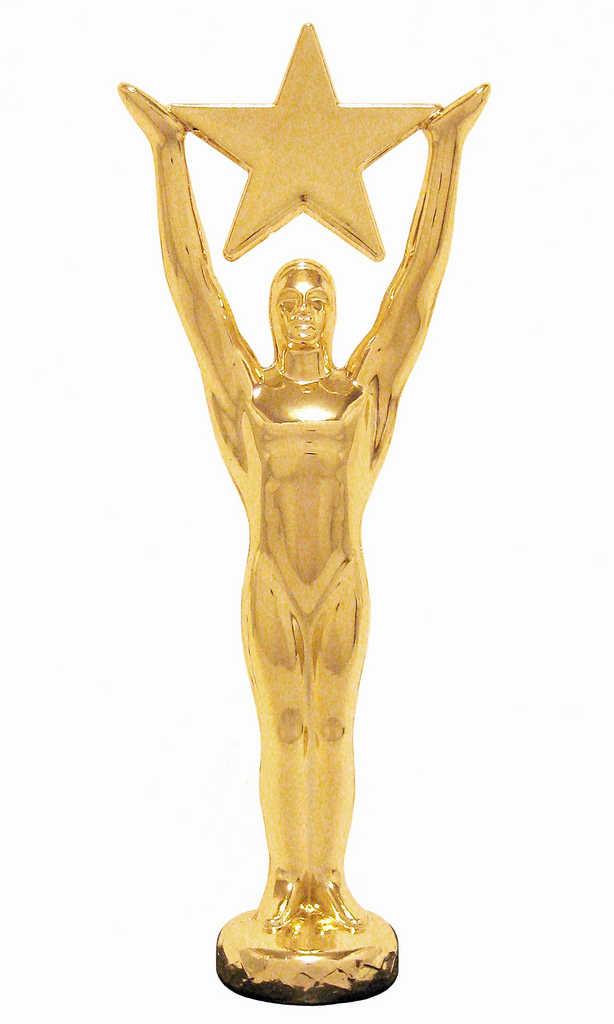
- Awarded for: Outstanding performance by a juvenile actress in a role in a Daytime TV Series
- Country: United States of America
- Presented by: Young Artist Association
- Currently held by: Haley Pullos, General Hospital (2013)
- Website: YoungArtistAwards.org

The Young Artist Award for Best Performance in a Daytime TV Series – Young Actress is one of the Young Artist Awards presented annually by the Young Artist Association to recognize a young actress under the age of 21, who has delivered an outstanding performance in role while working within the daytime industry.

The award first took place in October 1979 at the Sheraton Universal Hotel in Universal City, California. In 1983, it was called Best Young Actress in a Daytime Soap. In 1984, Daytime and Nighttime was combined into one category which was called Best Young Actress in a Daytime or Nighttime Television Series. In 1987 and 1988, there was no award given.

== Winners and nominees ==
Year	Actress	Program	Network	Ref
1979 (1st)
1979 (1st)	★ Tracey Bregman	Days of Our Lives	NBC	
1979 (1st)	Genie Francis	General Hospital	ABC	
1979 (1st)	Natasha Ryan	Days of Our Lives	NBC	
1980 (2nd)
1980 (2nd)	★ Genie Francis	General Hospital	ABC	
1980 (2nd)	Tracey Bregman	Days of Our Lives	NBC	
1980 (2nd)	Andrea Evans	One Life to Live	ABC	
1980 (2nd)	Dana Kimmell	Texas	NBC	
1980 (2nd)	Stacey Moran	Search For Tomorrow	CBS	
1981 (3rd)
1981 (3rd)	★ Becky Perle	The Kid Super Power Hour with Shazam!	NBC	
1981 (3rd)	Genie Francis	General Hospital	ABC	
1981 (3rd)	Dana Klaboe	Another World	NBC	
1982 (4th)
1982 (4th)	★ Lori Loughlin	The Edge of Night	ABC	
1982 (4th)	Jennifer Cooke	Guiding Light	CBS	
1982 (4th)	Liz Keifer	The Young and the Restless	CBS	
1982 (4th)	Debbie Lytton	Days of Our Lives	NBC	
1982 (4th)	Janine Turner	General Hospital	ABC	
1983 (5th)
1983 (5th)	★ Tracey Bregman	The Young and the Restless	CBS	
1983 (5th)	Kristian Alfonso	Days of Our Lives	NBC	
1983 (5th)	Lori-Nan Engler	The Doctors	ABC	
1983 (5th)	Debbie Lytton	Days of Our Lives	NBC	
1983 (5th)	Lisa Trusel	Days of Our Lives	NBC	
1984 (6th)
1984 (6th)	★ Shalane McCall (nighttime)	Dallas	CBS	
1984 (6th)	Melissa Brennan (daytime)	Santa Barbara	NBC	
1984 (6th)	Kristian Alfonso (daytime)	Days of Our Lives	NBC	
1984 (6th)	Dana Kimmell (daytime)	Days of Our Lives	NBC	
1984 (6th)	Lisa Trusel (daytime)	Days of Our Lives	NBC	
1985 (7th)
1985 (7th)	★ Kimberly McCullough	General Hospital	ABC	
1985 (7th)	Kristian Alfonso	Days of Our Lives	NBC	
1985 (7th)	Andrea Barber	Days of Our Lives	NBC	
1985 (7th)	Melissa Brennan	Santa Barbara	NBC	
1985 (7th)	Lisa Trusel	Days of Our Lives	NBC	
1986 (8th)
1986 (8th)	★ Kimberly McCullough	General Hospital	ABC	
1986 (8th)	Lauralee Bell	The Young and the Restless	CBS	
1986 (8th)	Melissa Brennan	Days of Our Lives	NBC	
1986 (8th)	Christie Clark	Days of Our Lives	NBC	
1986 (8th)	Kelly Hyman	The Young and the Restless	CBS	
1989 (10th)
1989 (10th)	★ Lauralee Bell	The Young and the Restless	CBS	
1989 (10th)	Christie Clark	Days of Our Lives	NBC	
1989 (10th)	Ami Dolenz	General Hospital	ABC	
1989 (10th)	Kimberly McCullough	General Hospital	ABC	
1989 (10th)	Kelly Hyman	The Young and the Restless	CBS	
1990 (11th)
1990 (11th)	★ Ashley Peldon	Guiding Light	CBS	
1990 (11th)	Christie Clark	Days of Our Lives	NBC	
1990 (11th)	Kelly Hyman	The Young and the Restless	CBS	
1990 (11th)	Julie Condra	Santa Barbara	NBC	
1990 (11th)	Kimberly McCullough	General Hospital	ABC	
1990/1991 (12th)
1990/1991 (12th)	★ Aimee Brooks	Days of Our Lives	NBC	
1990/1991 (12th)	Brighton Hertford	General Hospital	ABC	
1990/1991 (12th)	Kassandra Kelly	Generations	NBC	
1990/1991 (12th)	Ashley Peldon	Guiding Light	CBS	
1991/1992 (13th)
1991/1992 (13th)	★ Rachel Miner	Guiding Light	CBS	
1991/1992 (13th)	Susan Eckerling	General Hospital	ABC	
1991/1992 (13th)	Irene Ng	All My Children	ABC	
1991/1992 (13th)	Ashley Peldon	Guiding Light	CBS	
1991/1992 (13th)	Vicki Wauchope	Santa Barbara	NBC	
1993 (14th)
1993 (14th)	★ Melissa Hayden	Guiding Light	CBS	
1993 (14th)	Robyn Griggs	One Life to Live	ABC	
1993 (14th)	Rachel Miner	Guiding Light	CBS	
1993 (14th)	Lindsay Price	All My Children	ABC	
1993 (14th)	Heather Tom	The Young and the Restless	CBS	
1993 (14th)	Erin Torpey	One Life to Live	ABC	
1995 (16th)
1995 (16th)	★ Maitland Ward	The Bold and the Beautiful	CBS	
1995 (16th)	Courtney Chase	One Life to Live	ABC	
1995 (16th)	Sarah Michelle Gellar	All My Children	ABC	
1995 (16th)	Rachel Miner	Guiding Light	CBS	
1995 (16th)	Erin Torpey	One Life to Live	ABC	
1997 (18th)
1997 (18th)	★ Landry Albright	The Bold and the Beautiful	CBS	
1997 (18th)	Kimberly Brown	Guiding Light	CBS	
1997 (18th)	Kimberly McCullough	General Hospital	ABC	
1997 (18th)	Alison Sweeney	Days of Our Lives	NBC	
1997 (18th)	Erin Torpey	One Life to Live	ABC	
2001 (22nd)
2001 (22nd)	★ Brittany Snow	Guiding Light	CBS	
2001 (22nd)	Mary Elizabeth Winstead	Passions	NBC	
2001 (22nd)	Kirsten Storms	Days of Our Lives	NBC	
2001 (22nd)	Jennifer Finnigan	The Bold and the Beautiful	CBS	
2001 (22nd)	Ashley Lyn Cafagna	The Bold and the Beautiful	CBS	
2011 (32nd)
2011 (32nd)	★ Lexi Ainsworth	General Hospital	ABC	
2011 (32nd)	Taylor Spreitler	Days of Our Lives	NBC	
2011 (32nd)	Gabriela Rodriquez	Days of Our Lives	NBC	
2012 (33rd)
2012 (33rd)	★ Haley Pullos	General Hospital	ABC	
2012 (33rd)	Lexi Ainsworth	General Hospital	ABC	
2012 (33rd)	Ellery Sprayberry	The Young and the Restless	CBS	
2013 (34th)
2013 (34th)	★ Samantha Bailey	The Young and the Restless	CBS	
2013 (34th)	Haley King	The Young and the Restless	CBS	
2013 (34th)	Haley Pullos	General Hospital	ABC	
2014 (35th)
2014 (35th)	★ Haley Pullos	General Hospital	ABC	
2014 (35th)	Johnnie Ladd	The Young and the Restless	CBS	
2014 (35th)	McKenna Roberts	The Young and the Restless	CBS	
2014 (35th)	Brooklynn Rae Silzer	General Hospital	ABC	
