= A Girl Like Her (2015 film) =

- Theatrical release poster
- Directed by: Amy S. Weber
- Produced by: Amy S. Weber; Danny Roth; Jeffrey Spilman
- Starring: Hunter King; Lexi Ainsworth; Jimmy Bennett
- Cinematography: Sam Brownfield
- Edited by: Todd Zelin
- Music by: David Bateman
- Production companies: Radish Creative Group; Bottom Line Entertainment
- Distributed by: Parkside Releasing
- Release date: March 27, 2015
- Running time: 91 minutes
- Country: United States
- Language: English

A Girl Like Her is an American pseudo-documentary drama film directed by Amy S. Weber. The film stars Lexi Ainsworth as Jessica Burns, a 16-year-old bullied high school girl who attempts suicide, and Hunter King as Avery Keller, a former friend who has been relentlessly bullying Jessica for months. The film was originally titled The Bully Chronicles but the title was later changed.

== Plot ==
High school sophomore Jessica Burns attempts suicide by taking a handful of Hydrocodone pills from her mother Margarete's medicine cabinet. She is rushed to a hospital after Margarete finds her unconscious in the bathroom.

A famous filmmaker named Amy sets out to create a documentary about the school Jessica attends, as it is the only public school to place as one of the top ten schools in the country. During filming, Amy and her crew catch students worrying about Jessica. In interviews, all students claim to have noticed subtle tension between Jessica and popular student Avery Keller. According to Jessica's best friend, Brian Slater, the two had been close friends until Jessica prevented Avery from cheating off of her test in class, after which Avery began relentlessly bullying Jessica. When questioned, Avery casually denies this, claiming they simply drifted apart naturally after transitioning from middle to high school.

In response to the rumors, Avery agrees to record footage of her daily life to demonstrate the pressures of being popular. Though Avery herself is desensitized to it, her footage demonstrates that she comes from a dysfunctional family, and that her peers tend to feel intimidated by her teasing and controlling nature (for example, she and her clique restrict other girls from using a specific restroom while they apply their makeup).

Brian eventually confesses to the camera crew that six months ago, he and Jessica agreed to document Avery's harassment of her with a hidden camera disguised as a dragonfly brooch. He invites them into his home to show them the footage, which displays Avery regularly physically and verbally antagonizing Jessica. In the footage, Jessica alludes to suicidal ideation, and Brian encourages her to show the footage to school faculty, though she frantically refuses out of embarrassment and fear of Avery. While visiting Jessica in the hospital, Brian confesses all of this to Margarete - though upset, she implores Brian not to blame himself for what happened to Jessica.

As the student body grows further convinced that the rumors of Avery's bullying are true, the members of Avery's clique present a statement to principal Richard Harris detailing Avery's harassment of Jessica. Harris holds a conference with Avery and her parents, who staunchly defend her before she eventually storms out in frustration. That night, she posts a video on social media ranting about the situation and insisting that she holds no responsibility for what happened to Jessica. Amy confronts Avery at school the next day, advising her to remove the video and informing her that the crew has evidence of her bullying Jessica; Avery agrees to meet them at her house to watch the footage.

At the hospital that night, Jessica's heart stops beating. Her parents and the cameras are kicked out of the ICU as the doctors attempt to revive her. Jessica regains her pulse, but the doctors say that she will succumb to total organ failure if she doesn't wake from her coma soon. At Avery's house, she watches the footage and breaks down, admitting that she regrets her actions while Amy consoles her. Avery posts another video, this time tearfully apologizing and stating that no person deserves to be treated the way she treated Jessica. She ends the video with, "My name is Avery Keller, and I'm a bully."

The movie ends with a cut to Jessica as she finally opens her eyes.

== Cast ==
- Hunter King as Avery Keller
- Lexi Ainsworth as Jessica Burns
- Jimmy Bennett as Brian Slater
- Amy S. Weber as Filmmaker/Amy Gallagher
- Stephanie Cotton as Margarete Burns
- Mark Boyd as Dr. Gerald Burns
- Christie Engle-McGuckin as Kassie Keller
- Jon Martin as David Keller
- Michael Maurice as Principal Richard Harris
- Paul Lang as Dr. Patrick Webber, M.D.

== Reception ==
Justin Chang of Variety gave A Girl Like Her a mixed review, lauding the film as a "well-acted, well-meaning cautionary tale", but also criticizing it as "less and less convincing the more blatantly it strives for authenticity". Sheri Linden of The Hollywood Reporter lauded the film's acting, noting that the "two young female leads, exceptionally well cast, deliver strong performances", but felt "the drama lapses into speechifying".

Rotten Tomatoes gave the film an overall "fresh" rating of 65% based on 23 reviews.
