= Life in Pieces =

American television sitcom (2015–2019)

- Genre: Sitcom
- Created by: Justin Adler
- Starring: Colin Hanks; Betsy Brandt; Thomas Sadoski; Zoe Lister-Jones; Dan Bakkedahl; Angelique Cabral; Niall Cunningham; Holly J. Barrett; Giselle Eisenberg; James Brolin; Dianne Wiest; Hunter King; Ana Sophia Heger
- Music by: Rob Simonsen
- Country of origin: United States
- Original language: English
- No. of seasons: 4
- No. of episodes: 79 (list of episodes)

Production
- Executive producers: Justin Adler; Aaron Kaplan; Jeff Morton; Jason Winer; Brad Copeland; Barbara Adler
- Editor: Rich Hall
- Camera setup: Single-camera
- Running time: 21 minutes
- Production companies: 40 or 50 Years, Inc.; Kapital Entertainment; 20th Century Fox Television

Original release
- Network: CBS
- Release: September 21, 2015 – June 27, 2019

Life in Pieces is an American television sitcom created by Justin Adler that aired on CBS from September 21, 2015, to June 27, 2019, with a total of 79 half-hour episodes spanning four seasons. It was produced by 40 or 50 Years, Inc. and Kapital Entertainment, in association with 20th Century Fox Television, with Adler serving as showrunner. CBS canceled the series after four seasons on May 10, 2019.

== Premise ==
The series chronicles the lives of three generations of the Short family as they go about their daily lives in Los Angeles County. Each episode is told as four short stories, typically one for three of the four Short family branches and one that involves the fourth and ties the other three stories together.

== Episodes ==
Season	Episodes	Originally released		Rank	Avg. viewership (inc. DVR) (in millions)
Season	Episodes	First released	Last released	Rank	Avg. viewership (inc. DVR) (in millions)
1	22	September 21, 2015	March 31, 2016	30	10.53
2	22	October 27, 2016	May 11, 2017	40	8.15
3	22	November 2, 2017	May 17, 2018	44	8.27
4	13	April 18, 2019	June 27, 2019	77	6

== Cast ==
=== Family tree ===
John Short (James Brolin)	Dr. Joan Pirkle Short (Dianne Wiest)
Dr. Timothy Hughes (Dan Bakkedahl)	Heather Short Hughes (Betsy Brandt)	Matthew Short (Thomas Sadoski)	Colleen Brandon Ortega Short (Angelique Cabral)	Gregory Short (Colin Hanks)	Jennifer Collins Short (Zoe Lister-Jones)
Tyler Hughes (Niall Cunningham)	Clementine Hughes (Hunter King)	Samantha Hughes (Holly J. Barrett)	Sophia Hughes (Giselle Eisenberg)	(adopted) Lucas Short (Vivaan Bisoi)	Lark Short (Ana Sophia Heger)	Talia Short

=== Main ===
- Colin Hanks as Gregory "Greg" Short: Husband of Jen Short; youngest child of John and Joan Short; younger brother of Matt Short and Heather (Short) Hughes; father of Lark and Talia Short; worked for a crowd funding website until he quit his job in "Crytunes Divorce Tablet Ring". He ends up running a small company by accident in "Graffiti Cute Jewelry Shots".
- Betsy Brandt as Heather (Short) Hughes: Wife of Dr. Tim Hughes; oldest child and only daughter of John and Joan Short; older sister of Matt and Greg Short; mother of Tyler, Samantha, and Sophia Hughes; a stay at home mom.
- Thomas Sadoski as Matthew "Matt" Short: Divorced shortly before season 1 began (wife was Bonnie); middle child and oldest son of John and Joan Short; brother of Heather and Greg Short; dates Colleen Brandon Ortega until the end of "Hair Recital Rainbow Mom". He and Colleen get back together in "Cinderella Fantasy Prom Dougie". They become engaged in the second half of the two-part season 1 finale, "Crytunes Divorce Tablet Ring". They get married at the end of season 2, "Poison Fire Teats Universe". They adopt Lucas, an orphan boy, before season 4 episode 6.
- Zoe Lister-Jones as Jennifer "Jen" Collins Short: A lawyer; mother of Lark and Talia Short; wife of Greg Short. She announced that she is pregnant with their second child in season 1 finale, "Crytunes Divorce Tablet Ring"; however, it was later revealed that she had a miscarriage in the season 2 premiere, "Annulled Roommate Pill Shower". She told her husband that she is pregnant again in "Video Piercing Model Hangover". She gives birth to their second daughter in "Lost Math Art Glam".
- Dan Bakkedahl as Dr. Timothy "Tim" Hughes, M.D.: An ENT doctor; husband of Heather (Short) Hughes; father of Tyler, Samantha, and Sophia Hughes.
- Angelique Cabral as Colleen Brandon Ortega Short: Granddaughter of Tonita; owns a male puppy named "Princess"; dates Matt Short until the end of "Hair Recital Rainbow Mom". She and Matt get back together in "Cinderella Fantasy Prom Dougie". They get engaged in "Crytunes Divorce Tablet Ring". They get married at the end of season 2, "Poison Fire Teats Universe". They adopt Lucas, an orphan boy, before season 4 episode 5.
- Niall Cunningham as Tyler Hughes: Oldest child and only son of Tim and Heather Hughes; brother of Samantha and Sophia Hughes; dated Clementine from "Babe Secret Phone Germs" until they married before "Crytunes Divorce Tablet Ring". Beginning of season 3, they are getting divorced. It was mutual and decided to become friends. They got back together in the Season 3 episode "Therapy Cheating Shoes Movie".
- Holly J. Barrett as Samantha "Sam" Hughes: Middle child and older daughter of Tim and Heather Hughes; sister of Tyler and Sophia Hughes.
- Giselle Eisenberg as Sophia Hughes: Youngest child and younger daughter of Tim and Heather Hughes; sister of Tyler and Samantha Hughes.
- James Brolin as John Short: Retired airline pilot; partner of Joan (Pirkle) Short; father of Heather (Short) Hughes, Matt Short, and Greg Short; owns a female Yorkie named Tank since "Sexting Mall Lemonade Heartbreak". During season two when John was putting together his audition tape for "Survivor", he introduces himself as "John Bertram Short". In season one, he alludes to having served in the US Air Force and even makes reference to the US 101st Airborne Division.
- Dianne Wiest as Dr. Joan (Pirkle) Short: Wife of John Short; therapist; daughter of GiGi Pirkle; mother of Heather (Short) Hughes, Matt Short, and Greg Short. She and John are still together but, in "Crytunes Divorce Tablet Ring", they confessed to their kids that they got divorced in 1980 in protest when their best friends, a lesbian couple, couldn't get married.
- Hunter King as Clementine Hughes: (recurring season 1, main seasons 2–4) Daughter of Mary-Lynn; niece of Spencer (her "uncle-dad"); dated Tyler Hughes from "Babe Secret Phone Germs" until they married before "Crytunes Divorce Tablet Ring". At the beginning of season 3, they mutually decided to get a divorce; they remained friends. They got back together in the Season 3 episode "Therapy Cheating Shoes Movie".
- Ana Sophia Heger as Lark Short: (main seasons 3–4) Oldest daughter of Greg and Jen Short; sister of Talia Short.
- Vivaan Bisoi as Lucas Short: An orphan boy who Matt and Colleen Short adopted before season 4 episode 6.

=== Recurring ===
- Ann Guilbert as Shirley "GiGi" Pirkle: Mother of Dr. Joan (Pirkle) Short; widow (husband was Winston); lived at Hidden Harbor (Retirement Community), then lived at Rocking Hill Nursing Home. Following Guilbert's death in June 2016, the GiGi character's death was written into "Eyebrow Anonymous Trapped Gem" as a tribute, and all four stories of the episode revolved around GiGi.
- Jordan Peele as Chad: Ex-fiancé of Colleen. Chad had some legal troubles and hired Jen's law firm to represent him. He rented his share in Colleen's apartment to Dougie, who was part of his legal team (she's currently Colleen's roommate).
- Fortune Feimster as Dougie: A coworker of Jen; daughter of Jen's boss; member of legal team hired by Chad; Colleen's roommate since the season 1 finale, "Crytunes Divorce Tablet Ring". Dougie is loud, boisterous, uncouth and abrasive physically and emotionally. Despite that, she showed a more vulnerable side when she came out of the closet to Colleen and Matt. She had her very first lesbian kiss with Heather, Tim's wife. When Matt moved in with Colleen and Dougie, it was discovered that Matt wrestled in high school and both he and Dougie went undefeated in their high school careers. In the season 2 premiere, "Annulled Roommate Pill Shower", Dougie challenged Matt to a wrestling match to determine whether or not she has to move out of the apartment. Dougie won the match using her patented "hook, line, and sinker" move to keep her spot in the apartment.
- Martin Mull as Gary Timpkins: neighbor, president of the HOA in the neighborhood Joan lives in and a patient of Joan; a recent widower
- Susan Park as Dr. Sally Hong: Jen's OB/GYN
- Tonita Castro as Tonita: Colleen's grandmother. Tonita was very close to Colleen's ex-fiancée, Chad.
- Mercedes Ruehl as Mia: Colleen's mother. Married four times. Colleen fears she is turning into her mother.
- Bella Shepard as Lexie: one of Samantha's friends
- Ashley Wolff as Jenna: one of Samantha's friends
- Andrew McKeough as Jayden
- Martin Starr as Oscar: an exterminator; a field worker for "Scram! Trappers" animal control & pest removal
- Stephnie Weir as Bernadette
- Rhys Darby as Teddy
- Megan Mullally as Mary-Lynn: mother of Clementine; sister and partner of Spencer
- Nick Offerman as Spencer: brother and partner of Mary-Lynn; parent ("uncle-dad") of Clementine
- Josh Groban as Ian: an Irish salesman of guitars at a music store who often flirts with his female customers
- Russell Peters as Dr. Tak Oh, M.D.: coworker of Tim; widower (wife was Jackie)
- Wayne Federman as Dr. Saul Antro
- Angela Malhotra as Nurse Silvie: coworker of Tim
- Cary Elwes as Professor Sinclair Wilde: Joan's creative writing teacher since "Dinner Professor Steps Lesbian"
- Anne Stedman as Sangria: Colleen's stepmom
- Matt Cornett as Ryan: Samantha's boyfriend
- Joey King as Morgan: a pregnant 17-year-old from Modesto who (during the early part of season 4) intended to have her infant adopted, possibly by Matt and Colleen

== Production ==
On January 22, 2015, CBS placed a pilot order, under the title Life in Pieces. The pilot was written by Justin Adler and directed by Jason Winer. On May 8, 2015, CBS placed a series order. The first season was picked up for a full 22-episode order on October 27, 2015. On May 11, 2016, CBS renewed the show for a second season, which premiered on October 27, 2016. Life in Pieces was renewed for a third season on March 23, 2017, which premiered on November 2, 2017. Life in Pieces was renewed for a fourth season on May 12, 2018, which premiered on April 18, 2019.

On May 10, 2019, it was announced that CBS cancelled Life in Pieces. A combination of factors, including declining ratings, CBS's desire to have an ownership stake, and the network needing to clear space in getting four new sitcoms in the fall 2019 and mid-season schedule, led to the show's demise.

== Broadcast ==
The show debuted on September 21, 2015, on CBS. The first five episodes aired on Mondays, before it was moved on November 5, 2015, to a new time slot of 8:30 p.m. ET/PT (7:30 p.m. CT) on Thursdays, directly after CBS finished its NFL broadcasts. In the United States, all seasons are available on Hulu. The first season airs on Netflix, with all seasons being available in Canada for a time. All seasons were removed from Netflix in Canada on October 17, 2024. Shortly after, they became available on Disney+ in Canada.

In the United Kingdom, all seasons are available on Amazon Prime and Life in Pieces is shown season by season on Comedy Central UK and Ireland.

== Home media ==
20th Century Fox Home Entertainment released region-free, MOD versions of the first two seasons on Amazon on May 22, 2018. This was followed by the third season on June 12, 2018 and the fourth on July 9, 2019.

== Reception ==
=== Critical response ===
The review aggregator website Rotten Tomatoes reports a 62% approval rating for the first season, with an average rating of 6.58/10 and based on 39 reviews. The website's consensus reads "Life in Pieces strong cast delivers funny, offbeat stories even if they're not always relatable". On Metacritic, the season holds a score of 64 out of 100 based on 24 reviews, indicating "generally favorable reviews".

=== Ratings ===
Season	Timeslot (ET)	Episodes	Premiered		Ended		TV season	Rank	Viewers (in millions)
Season	Timeslot (ET)	Episodes	Date	Premiere viewers (in millions)	Date	Finale viewers (in millions)	TV season	Rank	Viewers (in millions)
1	Monday 8:30 p.m. (1–5); Thursday 8:30 p.m. (6–22)	22	September 21, 2015	11.28	March 31, 2016	7.23	2015–16	30	10.53
2	Thursday 9:30 p.m.	22	October 27, 2016	5.96	May 11, 2017	5.97	2016–17	40	8.15
3	Thursday 9:30 p.m.	22	November 2, 2017	6.67	May 17, 2018	4.95	2017–18	44	8.27
4	Thursday 9:30 p.m. (1–9); Thursday 9:00 p.m. (10–13)	13	April 18, 2019	6.73	June 27, 2019	3.38	2018–19	42	5.72
