= Hunter King =

American actress (born 1993)

- Born: Haley Ashley King; October 19, 1993 (age 33); Ventura County, California, U.S.
- Other name: Haley King
- Occupation: Actress
- Years active: 2001–present
- Known for: The Young and the Restless and Life in Pieces
- Spouse: Chris Copier (m. 2026)
- Partner: Nico Svoboda (2016–2020)
- Relatives: Joey King (sister)

Hunter Haley King (born Haley Ashley King; October 19, 1993) is an American actress. She is known for portraying Adriana Masters on Hollywood Heights (2012), Summer Newman on The Young and the Restless (2012–2016, 2018–2022) and Clementine Hughes on Life in Pieces (2015–2019). Earlier in her career she was credited as Haley King, but she has since been credited as Hunter King.

== Early and personal life ==
She has an older sister named Kelli and a younger sister, actress Joey King. At a young age, King acted in a theater in Agoura Hills, California.

In August 2018, King became engaged to her boyfriend of two years, Nico Svoboda. They called off their engagement in 2020.

In October 2024, King became engaged to Chris Copier. In March 2026, King announced she and Copier married on February 14, 2026.

== Career ==
King began her professional acting career by guest-starring in series such as Roswell, Hannah Montana and Workaholics. She starred as Adriana Masters in the Nick at Nite drama Hollywood Heights. It was there that she met The Young and the Restless executive producer Jill Farren-Phelps. "Jill brought me over there. I never auditioned for Y&R. As I was coming off the plane from Florida with a friend, Jill called and said, 'Do you want to come work on Y&R and play Summer?' I was like, 'Yeah.' She said, 'Okay. You start in two days.'"

On October 15, 2012, she made her debut on the CBS Daytime soap opera as Summer Newman, replacing Lindsay Bushman. King's performance in the role earned her a nomination for the Young Artist Award for Best Performance in a Daytime TV Series - Young Actress, losing out to her Y&R predecessor Samantha Bailey. King was also nominated for the Daytime Emmy Award for Outstanding Younger Actress in a Drama Series in 2013, losing out to Kristen Alderson before winning the following year, beating out Alderson, Linsey Godfrey, Kim Matula and Kelly Missal.

In 2014, it was reported that King accused her Y&R co-star Michael Muhney of groping her. Radar Online reported that King complained that Muhney fondled her breasts on two occasions, both of which were unsolicited and unwanted advances. According to Radar Online, King told producers she would go to the police and file a report against Muhney if he was not fired from the show. Muhney was fired on December 17, 2013, claiming that the allegations were false and merely a salacious rumor. No charges were ever filed.

King appeared as a guest model on two episodes of The Price Is Right during "Dream Car Week" in November 2013 and again for two more episodes in October 2014.

In 2015, King was cast in A Girl Like Her (originally named The Bully Chronicles) as Avery Keller, and was cast on the CBS comedy series Life in Pieces as Clementine. Initially a recurring role in season one, she was promoted to series regular for second season, leaving The Young and the Restless as regular cast member. In May 2018, TVLine announced that King would come back to The Young and the Restless as Summer as a contract cast member starting June 4, 2018. King was able to work on both her shows because an understudy took over her role as Summer for several episodes.

In November 2022, King signed a multi-picture contract with Hallmark Media.

== Filmography ==
Film roles
Year	Title	Role	Notes
2001	A.I. Artificial Intelligence	Amanda	as Haley King
2003	Deus Ex Machina	Mary	Short film (as Haley King)
2011	Judy Moody and the Not Bummer Summer	Priscilla Granger	
2015	A Girl Like Her	Avery Keller	
2015	Our Last Day as Children	Addie	Short film
2017	The Day of Matthew Montgomery	Flight Attendant	Short film
2026	Don't Move	Emma Rizzo	

Television roles
Year	Title	Role	Notes
2001	Roswell	Other Kid	Episode: "Samuel Rising" (as Haley King)
2002	Hidden Hills	Megan Slypich	Episode: Pilot (as Haley King)
2004	Line of Fire	Hannah Sorenson	Episode: "The Best-Laid Plans" (as Haley King)
2004	The Nick & Jessica Variety Hour	Mouseketeer	TV movie (as Haley King)
2004	Without a Trace	Noelle	Episode: "Trials" (as Haley King)
2006	Dexter	Teenage Debra Morgan	Episodes: "Let's Give the Boy a Hand", "Return to Sender" (as Haley King)
2008	ER	Julie O'Fallon	Episode: "Parental Guidance"
2009	Hannah Montana	Bridget	Episode: "Judge Me Tender"
2010	It Takes A Village	Alyssa	TV movie
2011	Workaholics	Melissa	Episode: "Karl's Wedding"
2012	Hollywood Heights	Adriana Masters	Main cast
2012–2016, 2018–2022	The Young and the Restless	Summer Newman	Main cast: 2012–2016, 2018–2021; recurring role: 2016; guest: 2021–2022
2015	CSI: Crime Scene Investigation	Lexi Nolan	Episode: "Under My Skin"
2015–2019	Life in Pieces	Clementine Hughes	Recurring role (season 1); main cast (seasons 2–4)
2021	The Bold and the Beautiful	Summer Newman	2 episodes
2021	Nailed It	Herself	Episode: "Travel Dos and Donuts"
2022	Hidden Gems	Addy	TV movie
2022	Nikki & Nora: Sister Sleuths	Nikki	TV movie
2022	A Royal Corgi Christmas	Cecily	TV movie
2023	The Professional Bridesmaid	Maggie Bailey	TV movie
2023	The Santa Summit	Jordin	TV movie
2024	Two Scoops of Italy	Danielle Turner	TV movie
2024	Holiday Touchdown: A Chiefs Love Story	Alana Higman	TV movie
2025	The Neighborhood	Bellamy	Episode: "Welcome to Venice"
2025	A Make or Break Holiday	Liv	TV movie
2026	9-1-1: Nashville	Young Blythe Hart	Episode: "Don Begins"
2026	Eight Nights for Love	Hannah	TV movie

== Awards and nominations ==
Year	Association	Category	Title	Result	Ref.
2013	Daytime Emmy Award	Outstanding Younger Actress in a Drama Series	The Young and the Restless	Nominated	
2013	Young Artist Awards	Best Performance in a Daytime TV Series - Young Actress	The Young and the Restless	Nominated	
2014	Daytime Emmy Award	Outstanding Younger Actress in a Drama Series	The Young and the Restless	Won	
2015	Daytime Emmy Award	Outstanding Younger Actress in a Drama Series	The Young and the Restless	Won	
2016	Daytime Emmy Award	Outstanding Younger Actress in a Drama Series	The Young and the Restless	Nominated	
2017	Daytime Emmy Award	Outstanding Younger Actress in a Drama Series	The Young and the Restless	Nominated	
2021	Soap Awards France	Best International Actress	The Young and the Restless	Nominated	
