= Throwback Thursday =

Internet trend

Throwback Thursday or #TBT is an internet trend used among social media platforms such as Instagram, Twitter and Facebook. On a Thursday, users will post nostalgia-inducing pictures – from a different era of their life, accompanied by the hashtag #TBT or #ThrowbackThursday. Many posts reflect positive moments, or funny, old clothes, hair and styles. Throwback Thursday can be attributed to any photo in one's past memories whether it be childhood, old relationships, past vacations, old songs, or anything that gives one a "happy and nostalgic feeling."

== Origin ==
Like many internet trends, it is hard to determine who or what exactly started the #TBT hashtag trend. The earliest usage on Instagram was by the user @bobbysander22.Sports Illustrated attributes the origin of the term to a sneaker-specific blog named Nice Kicks. According to SI, this blog began a practice of regular postings (on Thursdays) of photos of old basketball footwear in 2006, titling the series "Throwback Thursday". Since then, the slogan has blown up to the point where #TBT has been used on Instagram over 500 million times. While the trend has origins outside of social media, it only gained popularity once major apps such as Instagram began to rise in popularity as well.

== Popularity ==
In February 2012, Kim Kardashian and her family frequently started using the hashtag which caused it to start gaining traction.

== Other trends based on days of the week ==
=== Monday Motivation ===
Monday Motivation is a slogan redistributed on social media platforms such as Twitter, Instagram and Facebook under the hashtag #MondayMotivation where users of the social media sites post positive messages on a Monday. Positive quotes and uplifting messages are included in this hashtag as well as many photographs. Monday was the chosen day for such hashtag as a result of the widely known Monday Blues phenomena. The hashtag also aims to inspire productivity for all, with users using this hashtag for motivating other users to get out of bed on a Monday morning.

=== Flashback Friday ===
Similar to Throwback Thursday, Flashback Friday was a popular hashtag several months before Throwback Thursday was. Although both hashtags are similar, what makes them different is the days in which one can post a nostalgic picture. Flashback Friday is a second chance for social media lovers to upload a photo if they have forgotten on Thursday, or even for people to upload more vintage photos that allows them to share their content as many times as they want. On Fridays, social media users use the hashtag #flashbackfriday or #fbf to follow the trend.
