= Lisa D'Amato =

American model

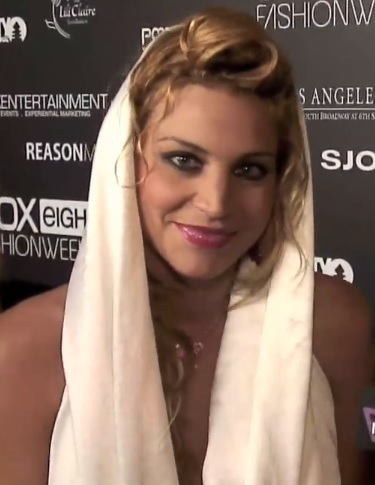
- D'Amato in 2009
- Born: Lisa Marie D'Amato; October 22, 1980 (age 45); Los Angeles, California, U.S.
- Other names: La Puchinetta, Lisa D., Miss October
- Spouse: Adam Friedman (2012–2023)
- Children: 2
- Modeling information
- Height: 5 ft 8 in (1.73 m)
- Hair color: Blonde
- Eye color: Green
- Agency: L.A. Models, Q Models, Nous Models
- Website: www.lisadamato.com

Lisa Marie D'Amato (born October 22, 1980) is an American recording artist, fashion model and television personality from Los Angeles. She first came into the public eye as a participant on Cycle 5 of the television series America's Next Top Model, being the seventh eliminated, and eventually went on to win Cycle 17: All Stars.

== Early life ==
D'Amato was born in Los Angeles, California. Her parents divorced when she was seven, with her mother raising her as a single parent. D'Amato started modeling at the age of 12.

== Reality TV ==
=== America's Next Top Model ===
==== America's Next Top Model Cycle 5 ====
D'Amato claims to have been dared to send in an audition tape to America's Next Top Model because her friends were obsessed with the show. After a year of persuasion, she decided to participate in the program realizing she had nothing to lose.

D'Amato was the last (thirteenth) contestant (edited as the second last (twelfth) contestant called and followed by Ebony Taylor when aired) selected for the top thirteen to compete on the UPN reality television show America's Next Top Model Cycle 5. On the show, D'Amato soon became known as the "most notorious" of the contestants, not scared to speak her mind to the other contestants. She explained that this support truly comes from her heart because she wants other models to look their best, especially on national television. D'Amato cites having been abused as a child as the reason for her hard-hitting, survivalist attitude. She shocked the other contestants by urinating in a diaper while on a shoot which Nicole Linkletter was disgusted about. D'Amato would run around with wigs, masks, and weird outfits; and once had a long conversation with a Pampas Grass bush she named "Cousin It". Over her stay, D'Amato won two challenges, received one Covergirl of the Week award, received one first call-out and two second call-outs.

The judges eliminated D'Amato seventh (since fellow contestant Cassandra Jean quit the competition in episode four) in London during her only ever bottom two appearance which Jayla Rubinelli had survived for the second consecutive time. D'Amato has been identified since cycle 5 as one of the most memorable contestants due to her entertaining personality, unconventional beauty, penchant for melodrama, and strong fan base.

==== America's Next Top Model Cycle 6 ====
D'Amato appeared as an assistant in a Cycle 6 episode where the top ten contestants received lessons on commercial and high-fashion posing from Janice Dickinson.

==== Winning America's Next Top Model Cycle 17: All-Stars ====
After her first appearance on the show, D'Amato was selected to return to America's Next Top Model along with former fellow contestant Bre Scullark to both represent their Cycle together on the first All-Star edition of the show along with twelve other returning contestants from past America's Next Top Model cycles. D'Amato's seemingly off the wall antics secured her spot on this season of the show and aided in her journey to the top. Like all the other contestants on Cycle 17, D'Amato was given a branding word: "daring". Using this key term, she presented herself on the show accordingly; wearing bold outfits for panel, expressing her extroverted personality and molding the challenges to fit her image. During her time on the show, she developed her own perfume called "Neon", performed in a music video for her song "I Be Like Whoa", won three challenges, received three first call-outs, survived her first bottom two appearance over Camille McDonald from Cycle 2 and was part of a non-elimination bottom two with former Cycle 12 semifinalist and Cycle 14 contestant Angelea Preston. On December 7, 2011, D'Amato won over fellow finalist Allison Harvard from Cycle 12 who was the runner-up in both of her cycles. D'Amato is the second contestant (after America's Next Top Model Cycle 8 Winner Jaslene Gonzalez) in the show's history to compete on more than one cycle and win. This win also makes D'Amato the oldest winner at the age of 30.

==== America's Next Top Model Cycle 18: British Invasion ====
D'Amato appeared in episode six of Cycle 18: British Invasion to inform the top nine contestants that they will have to perform in a group music video representing their country. The former Britain's Next Top Model contestants performing were Catherine Thomas of Cycle 4, Annaliese Dayes, and eventual cycle winner Sophie Sumner both of Cycle 5, and Alisha White of Cycle 6. The US contestants performing were Kyle Gober, Seymone Cohen-Fobish, Laura LaFrate, Eboni Davis and eventual eliminee from this episode AzMarie Livingston.

=== Other ===
She appeared on the third season of Celebrity Rehab.

She appeared on the fifth season of WeTV's Marriage Boot Camp Reality Stars.

In 2011, D'Amato starred in an Oxygen (TV channel) Network ordered television pilot titled "My Name Is Lisa" produced by Den of Thieves. The ensemble cast includes Lisa D'Amato, Brendan Vaughn, Adam Friedman, Benji Lanpher, Chris Bordeaux, and Lilly Rose.

D'Amato pitched her product, Dare-U-Go! on season 10 of Shark Tank. She made a deal with Barbara Corcoran for a $150,000 cash plus $200,000 loan in exchange for 35% stake.

== Modeling career ==
D'Amato has been modeling since the age of 12, starring in advertisements for companies such as XOXO, Barneys New York, Mervyn's, Teen Magazine, Sassy, YM, Seventeen, Guess, Flojos, Surfer Magazine, Dragonfly. She has travelled around the world doing runway shows and print for Barneys New York, XOXO, Guess, Jared Gold, Devon Becke's, Levi's, H&M, Diane Von Furstenberg, 2BeFree, Clementyne, Sebastian's International, Coca-Cola's Bon Voyage campaign, Q101 (a local radio station in Chicago, Illinois), Target, and The Gap's "Mellow Yellow" campaign.

After ANTM, D'Amato signed with L.A Models and L.A Talent which resulted her starring in ad campaigns for Black Chandelier, designed by Jared Gold, Clementyne, DaftBird, Swindle Magazine (where she appeared in a six-page editorial and write-up), Lemonade magazine (where she had a six-page spread and write-up). She has also modeled for Shoshanna Lonstein, DaftBird, Ford Fusion, Clementyne, Lip Service, Elle Girl Magazine, Lemonade magazine, Lilian Kha, and Permission magazine, where she appeared on the cover of its October 2006 issue. Her runway shows include Jared Gold, 2BeFree, Alice + Olivia's Fall 2006 collection and Jared Gold's Caspian Runway Show. D'Amato has also appeared in two Old Navy commercials and on Ripe TV. In December 2011, D'Amato became the face of ANTM's fragrance Dream Come True. In April 2012, D'Amato appeared in a six-page spread in Vogue Italia. In 2012, she began participating on a YouTube channel, damodel69.

=== Other ===
D'Amato lost the award for "The Reality Remix Awards" for "Favorite Altered State." In 2008, she was voted one of the most memorable Top Model contestants by AOL Entertainment. and as the tenth biggest villain in reality TV by TV Guide.

== Music career ==
D'Amato has pursued a career in music and has made a transition from modeling to performing, particularly in the rap, electro rap and hip hop genres. On October 8, 2007, the music video for her song "Ace of Spades" was released. Later she worked with Cisco Adler (Whitestarr, Shwayze, Dirt Nasty, Mickey Avalon). This partnership resulted in tracks including "My Name Is Lisa" and "Bikini". Adler and D'Amato collaborated on videos for those tracks. Her song "Can't Touch It!" was featured on the HBO show Entourage. She has opened for or worked with LMFAO, Hyper Crush, 3OH!3, Shwayze, Dirt Nasty, Andre Legacy, Mickey Avalon, Ultraviolet Sound, Electric Valentine, Boomkat and The Beach Boys.

=== Debut album ===
Her debut album called La Puchinetta was released in December 2009. The collaborators include DJ Lethal (House of Pain, Everlast), and DJ Gavin O'Connor. Between recording sessions, D'Amato has performed throughout the Southwestern United States, doing shows with her backup dancers, dubbed "The Super Smokin' Hot Bikini Dancers".

=== Second album ===
D'Amato's second album Flippin' the Bird was released in September 2011 and includes collaborations with The Cataracs (Far East Movement), L.P., Aqua (Rock-a-fella Records/Jay-Z), Kali, Chris Bordeaux and Colin Hartel.

=== Live performances ===
D'Amato has played as a resident and host at the Viper Room in Hollywood, California, the Key Club, MGM Grand Las Vegas, Rio Hotel Las Vegas, Air Conditioned Lounge Venice, CA, Fubar Hollywood, Roxy Theatre (West Hollywood), Hard Rock Hotel, Malibu Inn, Mood, SXSW (Austin, Texas), Palms Casino Resort (Vegas), Magic (Vegas), Coachella (Palm Springs, CA), and Hyde.

== Personal life ==
D'Amato married entrepreneur Adam Friedman on September 30, 2012 in the Hollywood Hills. On May 29, 2013, she announced that she was expecting a boy. Their first child was born on September 28, 2013. On September 22, 2016, their second son's birth was live streamed on Facebook. In 2022, D'Amato and her husband, Adam Friedman, relocated from Los Angeles to Portimão, Portugal. The couple separated in 2023, after approximately eleven years of marriage. By 2025, they were involved in a legal dispute concerning custody of their two sons and shared property in Portugal.

== TV appearances ==
- Shark Tank - Guest; 1 episode
- Strut - Guest; 2 episodes
- Industry Insider – Herself / Host
- Johnny V's Reality Stars – Herself
- America's Next Top Model – Episode 6 – As herself (guest)
- E! Grammy Fashion Police Fashion/Beauty Trends – As herself
- Ultimate Travel: The Last Resort – As herself
- The Tonight Show with Jay Leno – As herself
- Da'model Salon as herself
- America's Next Top Model – As herself (winner)
- "" Married to Rock - Wild Wedding Episode as herself
- Tacky House- Tacky Castle Episode as herself
- "Celeb-u-tots - Commentator
- The Oxygen Network ANTM Obsessed as herself
- TMZ as herself
- MTV Cribs - Herself
- Buzzin' - Herself
- The Tyra Banks Show (2005) as herself
- America's Next Top Model as herself (guest)
- America's Next Top Model as herself (contestant)
- Celebrity Rehab with Dr. Drew Season 3 as herself
- Rad Girls as herself
- Pit Boss, Rad Girls as herself
- Marriage Boot Camp as herself
- Battle of the Bling (2022) as herself

Preceded by Brittani Kline	America's Next Top Model winner Cycle 17 (2011)	Succeeded by Sophie Sumner
