= Kim Stolz =

Fashion model from the USA

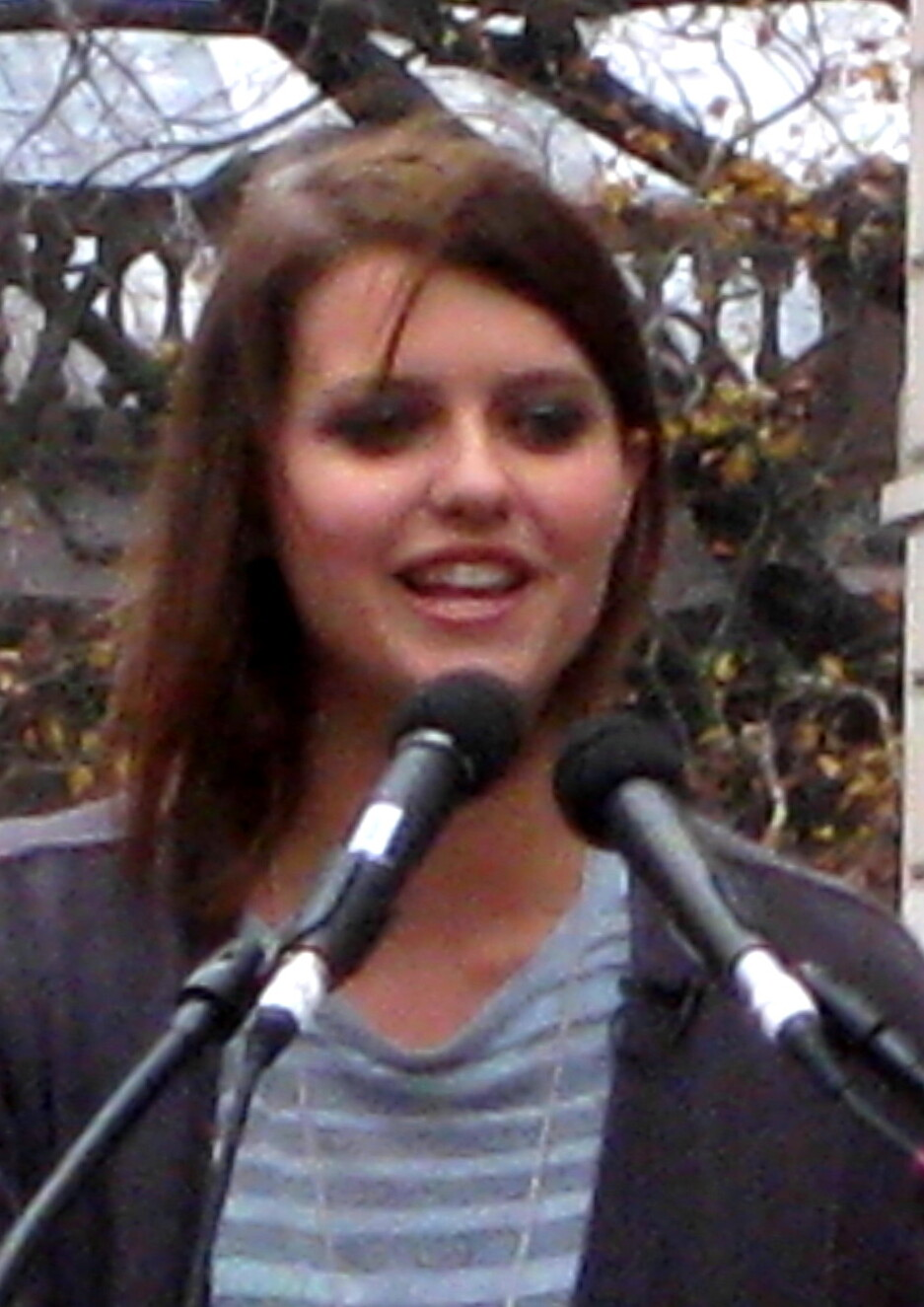
- Stolz at a 2008 Rally for equal marriage in New York City.
- Born: Kimberly Lynn Stolz; June 8, 1983 (age 43); New York City, U.S.
- Education: Wesleyan University
- Occupations: Financial executive; model; author; television personality
- Spouse(s): Lexi Ritsch (m. 2013; div. 2015) Cary Gibson (m. 2017; div. 2017) Laura Hayward (m. 2020)
- Children: 2
- Modeling information
- Height: 5 ft 8 in (1.73 m)
- Hair color: Brown
- Eye color: Green
- Agency: Elite Model Management; Ford Models

Kimberly Lynn Stolz (born June 8, 1983) is an American fashion model, television personality, author, and financial executive. Stolz was a correspondent for MTV News, and served as video jockey and host for The Freshmen, an emerging artist show on mtvU. Stolz first came to fame as a contestant on Cycle 5 of America's Next Top Model, where she became the ninth eliminated. As of 2018, she is an executive with BofA Securities.

On June 24, 2014, Stolz published her first book, Unfriending My Ex: And Other Things I'll Never Do.

== Early life and America's Next Top Model appearance ==
Stolz grew up on the Upper East Side of New York City and attended The Brearley School in Manhattan. Her father worked as a stockbroker at Goldman Sachs and her mother was a former supermodel who modeled for Givenchy and Ralph Lauren. In 2005, she earned a bachelor's degree in government and intergovernmental politics from Wesleyan University; she wrote her undergraduate thesis about U.S. foreign policy. After graduating, Stolz briefly worked in a law firm.

In fall 2005, Stolz was the sixth girl (after Cassandra Jean, Nik Pace, Kyle Kavanagh, Ashley Black and Bre Scullark) to be selected to participate on the fifth cycle of the UPN reality television show America's Next Top Model. She is an out lesbian, most notably kissing Sarah Rhoades, with whom Stolz survived her first bottom two appearance. Later throughout her stay, Stolz received two first call-outs. The judges eliminated Stolz eighth (since fellow contestant Cassandra Jean quit the competition in episode four) in London during her second bottom two appearance which eventual All Stars contestant Bre Scullark survived for the third time.

Stolz appeared in a Cycle 8 episode posing in a photograph with eventual tenth eliminated contestant Dionne Walters. Fellow Cycle 5 contestant Bre Scullark was also present for this shoot posing with Cycle 7 top 100 contestant and eventual winner Jaslene Gonzalez.

Stolz appeared in a Top Models in Action segment during an episode of Cycle 11.

== Career ==
Stolz was a video jockey for The Freshman on mtvU and was also an MTV News correspondent. In 2008, she reported extensively on the 2008 Iowa Caucus and interviewed presidential candidates John Edwards and Mike Huckabee. Stolz also pursued a career in fashion modeling; soon after she appeared on America's Next Top Model, Stolz was signed with Elite Model Management in New York City and was later signed to Ford Models in New York. Stolz also had a small role on an episode of the UPN series, Veronica Mars, as part of a challenge win for America's Next Top Model. She has also been featured as one of CoverGirl's Top Models in Action.

Stolz is signed to Ford Models. She has written articles for The Huffington Post.

In 2008, Stolz was listed as one of the most memorable contestants from America's Top Model by AOL Entertainment Canada.

In 2012, Stolz and her friend Amanda Leigh Dunn, who appeared in the reality TV show The Real L Word, opened "The Dalloway", a two-level restaurant and cocktail lounge in SoHo, New York City. It closed in 2013.

In 2014, Stolz published the book Unfriending My Ex, addressing how social media has shaped her generation.

Stolz was appointed managing director at Bank of America Merrill Lynch, Head of Americas Prime Brokerage Sales, in 2018.

== Modeled for ==
- RUEHL No.925 (Abercrombie & Fitch sister brand)
- GO magazine
- Brooklyn Industries
- American Eagle Outfitters fall 2006
- Women's Wear Daily
- Knit.1 (multiple issues),
- Cover magazine (April 2007)
- Nordstrom (November 2006)
- Pretties
- Chris Benz Collection (fall/winter 2007)
- eLuxury.com,
- American Salon
- Teen Vogue
- Autostraddle online magazine

== Television appearances ==
- America's Next Top Model, Cycle 5 as herself/contestant
- The Freshmen (MtvU) as herself
- The Tyra Banks Show (2005) as herself
- Veronica Mars as Stacy, a rental-car clerk for the Lariant Rental Car company, in the episode "Rat Saw God" (episode 6, season 2, 2005)
- TRL as herself
- E! True Hollywood Story: America's Next Top Model as herself
- MTV News as herself
- Mother May I (2008) as herself
- Michael Jackson Memorial Service (2009) as herself
- 2009 Video Music Awards as herself
- Sexting in America: When Privates Go Public (2010) as herself
