= Rat Saw God (Veronica Mars) =

- Veronica Mars episode
- Episode no.: Season 2 Episode 6
- Directed by: Kevin Bray
- Written by: John Enbom; Phil Klemmer
- Production code: 2T7206
- Original air date: November 9, 2005

Guest appearances
- Harry Hamlin as Aaron Echolls; Michael Muhney as Don Lamb; Krysten Ritter as Gia Goodman; Daran Norris as Cliff McCormack; Rick Peters as Dr. Tom Griffith; Christian Clemenson as Abel Koontz; Christopher B. Duncan as Clarence Wiedman; Joss Whedon as Douglas; Tracey Walter as Manager; Kim Stolz as Stacey

Episode chronology
| ← Previous "Blast from the Past" | Next → "Nobody Puts Baby in a Corner" |
- Veronica Mars season 2

"Rat Saw God" is the sixth episode of the second season of the American mystery television series Veronica Mars, and the twenty-eighth episode overall. Written by Phil Klemmer and John Enbom and directed by Kevin Bray, the episode premiered on UPN on November 9, 2005.

The series depicts the adventures of Veronica Mars (Kristen Bell) as she deals with life as a high school student while moonlighting as a private detective. In this episode, Abel Koontz (Christian Clemenson) returns and requests Veronica's help in finding his daughter. Meanwhile, Logan (Jason Dohring) is arrested for his supposed stabbing of a biker gang member, and Keith (Enrico Colantoni) loses the Sheriff's election.

== Synopsis ==
Veronica waits with Keith at an election party, where tensions are high due to the results being extremely close. Sheriff Lamb (Michael Muhney) is nosing ahead when a man walks up to Lamb and says he made the anonymous call from the bridge where Felix Toombs was stabbed. Keith loses the election by a margin of 51% to 49%. After, we learn that Woody Goodman (Steve Guttenberg) has been elected mayor. Dick Casablancas (Ryan Hansen) confronts Logan about sleeping with Kendall, and then hits on Gia Goodman (Krysten Ritter) by bragging about how he is the "man of the house" now that his father is hiding overseas. Officers show up at the party and re-arrest Logan for the murder of Felix Toombs. Veronica leaves the party and finds Abel Koontz, who is in the end-stage of stomach cancer, outside the door of Mars Investigation. He asks Veronica to help him find his daughter, Amelia, who has disappeared, and Veronica agrees. Veronica talks to Amelia's old boyfriend, who has not seen her for a while. He tells Veronica that Amelia ditched him while in Europe, and he hasn't seen her since. Logan hires Cliff McCormack (Daran Norris) to be his lawyer. Cliff tells Logan he knows Logan hiring him is a stunt, and he should hire a different lawyer. Veronica asks Cliff to call the numbers on the phone cards that Amelia stole from her ex-boyfriend. Veronica finds out that Amelia used one of the calling cards to place an outgoing call from Neptune the previous week. Logan is placed in a cell with his father, Aaron (Harry Hamlin), who is temporarily being held there before his trial for the murder of Lilly Kane. Logan is released on bail, which angers Weevil and his friends, who discuss how their motorcycle club is getting a reputation for being "soft". Veronica breaks into Clarence Wiedman's (Christopher B. Duncan) office to confront him, but he denies any knowledge of where Amelia might be.

Veronica speaks to Amelia's ex-boyfriend, who admits Amelia had a fake ID in the name of her cousin, Margot Schnell. After Logan is released on bail Don Lamb drives him back to the Echolls estate. He and Logan arrive to find that Logan's house is on fire. Veronica fakes being a distressed businesswoman in order to track the car that Amelia rented two days prior using her fake ID. Keith confronts Sheriff Lamb about recovering the wreckage of the bus. Sheriff Lamb retaliates by telling Keith about Veronica being taken in for questioning. Veronica tracks Amelia's last known location, which turns out to be a run-down motel. Keith calls Veronica to confront her about withholding information and Veronica tells him about David "Curly" Moran and her suspicions about the bus crash. Veronica's computer picks up a signal from Amelia's device, leading to her finding Amelia dead in an icebox. Before Veronica can call 911, Clarence Wiedman suddenly appears. He admits that Amelia contacted him asking for more money, which he gave her on the condition she leave town. However, he knew Amelia had not actually left. Veronica and Clarence confront the man at the front desk of the motel, who tells them Amelia came in with a man, and Veronica says she knows who it is.

Keith arranges to meet Aaron, and threatens that if anything happens to Veronica, Keith will go after Aaron personally. Veronica and Clarence go to Amelia's boyfriend's room and Clarence dangles him off a window ledge, but he insists he knows nothing, and they leave. Weevil and Logan get into a fight at school, partly because Weevil is upset Logan got bail and partly because Logan has just bought Weevil's grandmother's house and evicted her. Veronica is contacted by a friend of Amelia's, who tells her Amelia started dating a man named Carlos after leaving her boyfriend, and the motel clerk verifies that Carlos was the man with Amelia. Clarence decides to track down Carlos, despite the fact that he is a diplomat's son. Veronica visits Abel Koontz in the hospital, and is told he has only a couple of days left to live. She lies to Abel about Amelia's fate, telling him that she is happy and traveling the world, to spare his feelings before his death. Keith breaks into the warehouse where the wreckage of the bus is being stored and finds the remains of a rat taped to the bottom of the bus.

== Production ==
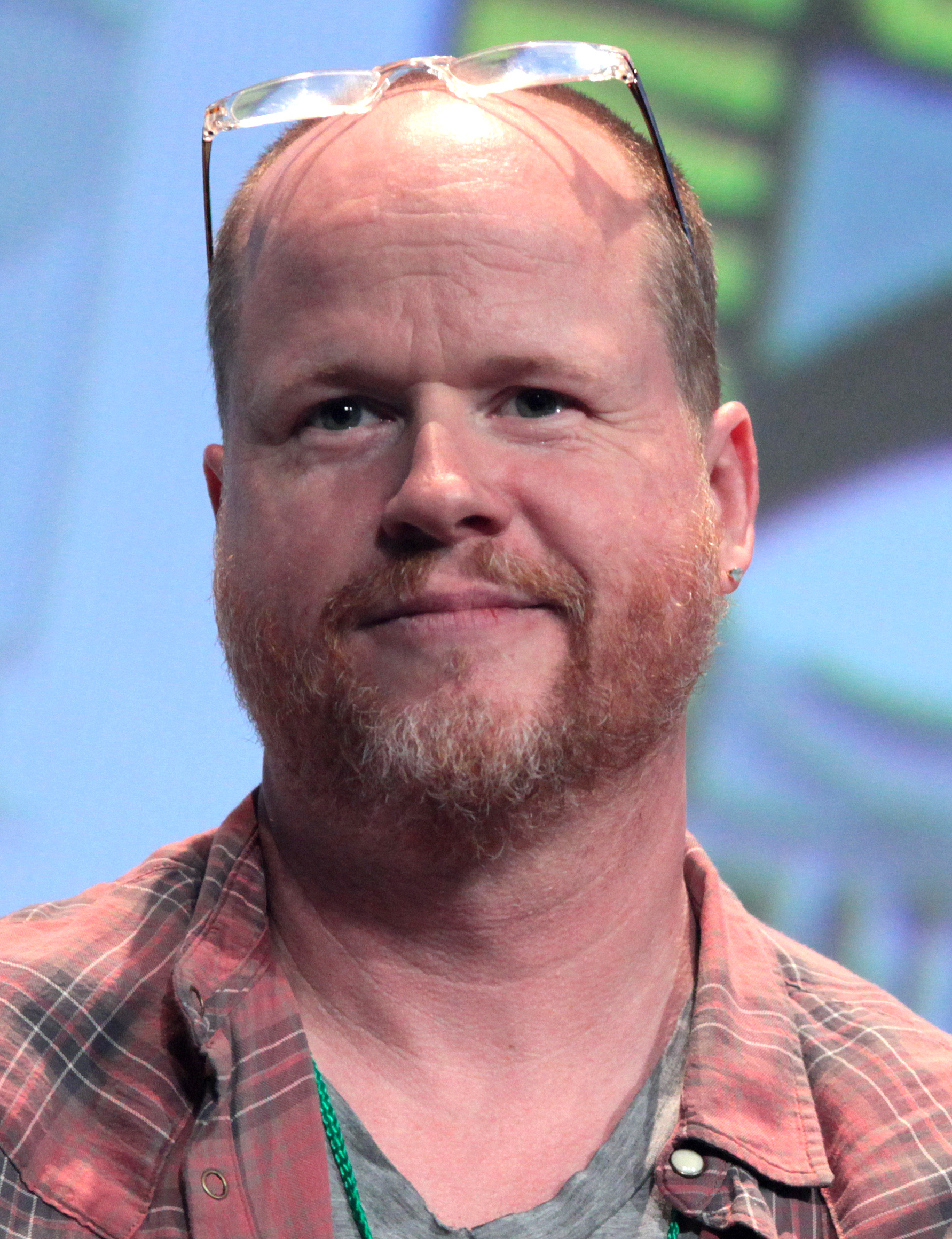
Joss Whedon had a cameo appearance in the episode. Whedon had previously expressed his admiration for the show.

The episode was written by John Enbom and Phil Klemmer and directed by Kevin Bray. "Rat Saw God" marks the fifth writing credit for Enbom, Klemmer's seventh writing credit, and Bray's first and only directing credit for the series. This was one of Klemmer's favorite episodes of the show that he wrote, writing that "I think that scene with Clarence and Veronica getting together is just funny and cool." Both writers wanted the main plot to involve Amelia DeLongpre, and Klemmer wrote the subplots. The episode also features several guest appearances; many recurring characters from the first season reappear in the episode, including Abel Koontz (Christian Clemenson), Clarence Wiedman (Christopher B. Duncan), and antagonist Aaron Echolls (Harry Hamlin). In addition, "Rat Saw God" features the second appearance by Gia (Krysten Ritter), who had been absent since "Normal Is the Watchword". The episode also features a cameo appearance by model Kim Stolz. Stolz was awarded the role for winning a small contest while competing on the fifth cycle of America's Next Top Model.

"Rat Saw God" features a cameo by television director Joss Whedon. Veronica Mars has often been compared to Whedon's series Buffy the Vampire Slayer, with some even calling it the successor to the latter. Whedon had previously praised the first season on the weblog Whedonesque, saying that Veronica Mars was the "Best. Show. Ever." and that "[he'd] never gotten more wrapped up in a show [he] wasn't making, and maybe even more than those." Whedon also gave a glowing review of the first season for Entertainment Weekly, writing that "Season 1 works as mystery, comedy, and romantic drama, often simultaneously. But what elevates it is that in a TV-scape creepily obsessed with crime-solving, VM actually asks why." Upon being asked about Whedon's praise, Jason Dohring, who plays Logan, said in an interview:

It was the buzz of the set: 'Did you hear what he said about us?,’ Stuff like that. [Director] Kevin Smith also did a nice write-up, and what was cool was that they really know their stuff; their attention to detail [regarding 'Veronica Mars’] was so cool. You never know if your work will be seen, so to have it seen by someone great, someone you really respect, that’s so cool. Though if I’d known they were watching, I would have been a lot more nervous!

Series creator Rob Thomas contacted Whedon over the previous summer, and Whedon agreed to do a cameo. The episode's title refers to Rats Saw God, a novel by series creator Rob Thomas. Despite being credited, Wallace (Percy Daggs III), Jackie (Tessa Thompson), and Cassidy "Beaver" Casablancas (Kyle Gallner) do not appear.

== Reception ==
=== Ratings ===
In its original broadcast, "Rat Saw God" received 3.07 million viewers, marking a decrease in 0.51 million viewers from "Blast from the Past".

=== Reviews ===
Rowan Kaiser of The A.V. Club gave a positive review, praising the intersecting storylines and the references to the previous season. "More generally, [the plot lines] show that Veronica Mars has created a strong enough world that it can support much higher levels. I have been, and still somewhat am, dubious about the pace at which this season is moving. But this was a great episode, even with all its density and the fact that it was essentially all setup. And it was great because it was attached to the history of the show so far." Television Without Pity gave the episode an "A".

Price Peterson, writing for TV.com, wrote in his episode verdict that "This episode was great, if way more grim than usual. Between Abel's offscreen cancer death to Amelia's icy resting place…there was a real whiff of death in this episode." Complex ranked Kim Stolz's cameo on its list of "the 25 worst cameos in TV history." BuzzFeed ranked the episode forty-fifth on its list of the best Veronica Mars episodes, criticizing the Clarence Wiedman plot while writing that "we get to see some prime banter between Logan and Cliff, two of the show’s funniest characters."
