= List of Elle Girl cover models =

Elle Girl is a spin-off of Elle magazine. It is a fashion magazine targeted to the teenage market. The magazine was published by Hachette Filipacchi. The magazine features a model, actress, or singer. It started with the fall 2001 issue and ceased publication in 2006 with the June/July issue.

== 2006 ==
- June/July: Adam Brody
- May: Emma Roberts
- April: Amanda Bynes
- March: Nicole Richie
- February: Tyra Banks and Nicole Linkletter

== 2005 ==
- December/January 2006: Emma Watson
- November: Alexis Bledel
- October: Mischa Barton
- September: Rachel Bilson
- August: Hilary Duff
- June/July: Amber Tamblyn
- May/June: Devon Aoki
- April: Christina Ricci
- March: Lindsay Lohan
- February: Rachel Bilson

== 2004 ==
- December/January 2005: Gwen Stefani
- October/November: Sarah Michelle Gellar
- September: Drew Barrymore
- August: Avril Lavigne
- February/March: Christina Aguilera

== 2003 ==
- November/December: Mischa Barton
- September/October: Michelle Branch
- April: Avril Lavigne
- February/March: Eve

== 2002 ==
- Holiday: Mandy Moore and Kelly Osbourne
- Fall: Jennifer Lopez
- Summer: Megan Ewing
- Spring: Gwen Stefani

== 2001 ==
- Fall: Julia Stiles
