= Angelea Preston =

American model

Angelea Preston is an American former model, television personality and journalist. She is known for competing on multiple cycles of America's Next Top Model, including cycle 14 and cycle 17: All-Stars. Preston was originally named the winner of cycle 17 before being disqualified after filming; the finale was later reshot with Lisa D'Amato named the winner.

== Early life and education ==
Preston is from Buffalo, New York. In 2021, she graduated summa cum laude from Buffalo State University with a bachelor's degree in journalism.

=== America's Next Top Model ===
Preston first appeared in the casting process for cycle 12 of America's Next Top Model. She later competed on cycle 14, in which she was eliminated before the final runway show.

Preston returned for cycle 17, also known as America's Next Top Model: All-Stars. She was originally selected as the winner, but was disqualified after filming. The finale was reshot, and Lisa D'Amato was named the winner, with Allison Harvard finishing as the runner-up.

== Disqualification and lawsuit ==
The televised cycle 17 finale stated that Preston had been disqualified under "unusual circumstances", but did not provide a detailed explanation. In a later interview with Bustle, Preston said that producers had learned that she had previously worked as an escort and that her title and prizes were taken away after she had already been selected as the winner.

In 2014, Preston filed a $3 million lawsuit against Tyra Banks, the show's producers, The CW and CBS, alleging that she had been wrongfully disqualified because of her past work as an escort. The lawsuit alleged that her escort work had occurred before the filming of cycle 17 and did not violate the show's rules. It also alleged breach of contract, emotional distress and labor-law violations related to conditions during filming. Preston later dropped the lawsuit in 2018.

In 2026, Preston discussed the disqualification in E!'s documentary special ''Dirty Rotten Scandals: America's Next Top Model''. She said that she was told several weeks after being crowned that the finale would not air because she had been disqualified for "engaging in sex work", which she said was treated as a violation of a morality clause in her contract.

== Journalism ==
After leaving the modeling industry, Preston pursued journalism. By 2022, she was working as a Sunday host for WBFO, an NPR member station in Buffalo. She later appeared as an interviewer and host on WBFO's Buffalo, What's Next? program.

== Later coverage ==
In June 2026, Preston responded to Banks's lawsuit against Netflix and the producers of Reality Check: Inside America's Next Top Model, a documentary series about the history and legacy of America's Next Top Model. Preston told Entertainment Weekly that Banks's allegations about selective editing resembled concerns that former contestants had raised about the original series.
