= Bre Scullark =

American fashion model

- Born: Brittney Lavelle Scullark; April 26, 1985 (age 41); New York City, U.S.
- Modeling information
- Height: 5 ft 8 in (1.73 m)
- Hair color: Black
- Eye color: Brown
- Agency: Ford Models

Brittney Lavelle "Bre" Scullark (born April 26, 1985) is an American former fashion model and yoga instructor. She became the last eliminated on America's Next Top Model, Cycle 5.

== Early life ==
Scullark was born in Harlem, New York. She began swimming competitively when she 9 years old, winning many medals. Scullark attended Catholic school throughout elementary and middle school. For high school she attended Jacqueline Kennedy Onassis High School for International Careers (Times Square vicinity). She was a student at Sullivan County Community College in upstate New York, where she studied international sales and interned at Vincent Nessi's showroom. Her first fashion show was The Juneteenth fashion show in NYC.

== America's Next Top Model ==
=== America's Next Top Model Cycle 5 ===
In fall 2005, Scullark was the fifth girl (after Cassandra Jean, Nik Pace, Kyle Kavanagh and Ashley Black) to be selected to participate on the fifth cycle of the UPN reality television show America's Next Top Model. She is perhaps best known for her raspy, sultry voice and spunky personality. Over her stay, she won two challenges, was voted Covergirl of the Week twice in a row and received one first call-out before going to London. Scullark was involved in a memorable argument with fellow contestant Nicole Linkletter when she accused Linkletter of stealing her granola bar, and retaliated by disposing of all of Linkletter's Red Bull energy drinks down the drain in the bathroom; Kim Stolz mediated and asked Scullark whether she was going to replace whatever she had taken away. Scullark refused to talk civilly until they reconciled during a day out in London when they were paired together, originally to their dismay. In 2011, Lisa D'Amato confessed that she had stolen the granola bar despite claiming nine years later her confession was all a hoax for humor. Scullark was placed in the bottom two four times for (on each occasion) her inability to handle the cutthroat modelling industry, her potential to be high fashion rather than doing great at commercial, her unprofessional behavior at the photo-shoot and at panel (despite a very strong photo) and for not elongating her height in the Bollywood photo-shoot however she had survived over Diane Hernandez, Kyle Kavanagh, Kim Stolz and Jayla Rubinelli, respectively. Despite her strong improvement, the judges eliminated Scullark tenth (finishing third in overall rank since fellow contestant Cassandra Jean quit the competition in episode four) during her fifth collective (also her third consecutive in London) bottom two appearance as she was seen weaker than the other two competitors Nik Pace (who was the first selected finalist) and Nicole Linkletter who survived over Scullark and eventually won.

=== America's Next Top Model Cycle 7 ===
Scullark appeared in episode four of Cycle 7 to critique the models on their walks which led to A.J. Stewart winning the runway challenge and chose Megg Morales and eventual winner CariDee English to share the prize.

=== America's Next Top Model Cycle 8 ===
Scullark appeared in a Cycle 8 episode posing in a photograph with eventual winner Jaslene Gonzalez in regards to her missing granola bar. Fellow Cycle 5 competitor Kim Stolz was also present for this shoot.

=== America's Next Top Model Cycle 12 ===
Scullark appeared in a Top Models in Action segment during an episode of Cycle 12.

=== America's Next Top Model Cycle 17: All-Stars ===
Bre was selected to return to America's Next Top Model along with former fellow contestant Lisa D'Amato to both represent their Cycle together on the first All-Star edition of the show along with twelve other returning models. Scullark became the fifth eliminated overall in the competition.

== Career ==
Scullark is currently signed to Ford Models in New York City, Chicago, Miami and Los Angeles. She has done some Ask Bre featurettes with them.

=== Runway ===
Referred to by Ms J. as one of the best walkers ever on the show, she has participated in many fashion shows including BET’s Rip the Runway and Hot 97’s Fashion Show. Other runway credits include Valentino and Nicole Miller. Scullark modeled for Doucette Duvall for New York Fashion Week Fall/Winter 2008.

=== Print Work ===
She has also been featured in Vibe Magazine, Essence Magazine, Elle Girl, and Hype Hair Magazine. Together with Nik Pace and Nicole Linkletter, they shared a spread in US Weekly, December 2005 issue. She was also in Instyle magazine. Scullark had a cover and spread for Mahogany Magazine in Fall 2006. Scullark had a spread for Knit 1 magazine and appeared in the April 2007 issue of Cover Magazine. She has done print work for Doucette Duvall. Scullark was in the June/July 2008 issue of CosmoGirl. She also had a spread in the June issue of Six Degrees Magazine. She has also modeled for Real Simple. She also appeared in ads for Pantene Sisters of Shine Tour and Vaseline, Sears, KMart and Wal-Mart's Piper and Blue Jeans. She appeared in the December 2008 issue of Ebony Magazine.

=== Commercials ===
She has also appeared in commercials for Target, Old Navy and Pantene. She is currently a spokesmodel for Ambi skin care products for women of color. She appears on the front of the hair-coloring box kits for Dark and Lovely coloring products. She has been featured as one of CoverGirl's Top Models in Action. She was also featured in a Garnier HerbaShine Commercial in late 2010.

=== Philanthropy ===
Scullark is also a spokesperson for Drop Dead Gorgeous, a non-profit organization which works against child sex-trafficking.

=== Other ===
She appeared in the music video Change Me by Ruben Studdard. She hosted Certified, a music show. Scullark appeared many times on the Tyra Banks Show, including one episode where she modeled for Jill Stuart. She was interviewed in the September 2008 issue of Ebony Magazine in an article about the fashion's industry "blackout" titled Where are all the black models. She appeared in an Ambi commercial. Scullark appeared in Wale's Lotus Flower Bomb Ft, Miguel music video. She appeared in Tyler Perry's For Better or Worse. She appeared in an episode of CSI. In 2012, she participated on a YouTube channel, damodel69, which was also in Da'model Salon. In 2013, she appeared in "Let the Church Say Amen", a film directed by Regina King.
