= America's Next Top Model season 17 =

America's Next Top Model
- Season 17
- Judges: Tyra Banks; Nigel Barker; André Leon Talley
- No. of contestants: 14
- Winner: Lisa D'Amato
- No. of episodes: 13

Release
- Original network: The CW
- Original release: September 14 – December 7, 2011

Additional information
- Filming dates: May 11 – June 23, 2011

Season chronology
- ← Previous; Season 16 Next → Season 18

The seventeenth cycle of America's Next Top Model (subtitled as America's Next Top Model: All Stars) premiered on September 14, 2011, on The CW. It featured fourteen returning models from previous cycles.

The judging panel, unchanged since Cycle 14, once again consisted of Tyra Banks, Nigel Barker and André Leon Talley. The first judging was conducted in front of a live audience. The international destination for this cycle was the Greek island of Crete, the show's first visit to Southeast Europe.

The promotional song for this cycle was "You Make Me Feel..." by Cobra Starship featuring Sabi. This was the final cycle filmed and broadcast in standard definition and the final cycle for Andre Leon Talley as a judge.

The original winner of the competition was 25-year-old Angelea Preston, who was originally a top 34 contestant on Cycle 12 and became the eleventh contestant eliminated on Cycle 14, but was later disqualified, stripped of her title after it was made known that she had once worked as an escort. A lawsuit was filed by Preston in 2014 for breach of contract and labor law violations but dropped in 2018. The finale was re-filmed with the crowning of 30-year-old Lisa D'Amato from Los Angeles, California, who originally became the seventh contestant eliminated (since fellow contestant Cassandra Jean quit the competition in episode four) on Cycle 5 making her the oldest winner ever at the age of 30. Allison Harvard, who originally became the runner-up on Cycle 12 losing to Teyona Anderson, placed as the runner-up for the second time.

== Casting ==
This season has been subtitled "All-Stars," featuring fourteen returning non-winning contestants representing twelve of the series' sixteen cycles for a second chance to win the title. Cycles 3, 6, 7 and 8 are all not represented. Cycles 1, 2, 4, 9, 10, 12, 13, 14, 15 and 16 were all represented by one contestant each and Cycles 5 and 11 were each represented by two contestants.

Before Cycle 17 became an all-star season, early production for the cycle was a regular season. All of the American contestants of Cycle 18 were all contestants. The production team turned Cycle 17 into an All Stars season very early into production and promised the contestants that were new that they have a shot at winning by being on the next Cycle. Eventual sixth contestant eliminated, AzMarie Livingston from Cycle 18 and a Cycle 16 top 32 contestant named Molly (not to be confused with runner-up Molly O'Connell) who also auditioned and made it pass the top 32 contestants confirmed this.

Cycle 14 contestant Angelea Preston competed for the third time on America's Next Top Model in Cycle 17 as she was initially introduced as a Top 32 contestant on Cycle 12 best known for her fight with Sandra Nyanchoka who was the fifth contestant eliminated after Celia Ammerman survived the bottom two in week five. Tenth contestant eliminated Bianca Golden of America's Next Top Model Cycles 9 and eleventh contestant eliminated Dominique Reighard and 10, respectively, participated in a competition hosted by Tyra Banks for the third time as they had both appeared on Modelville alongside Renee Alway from Cycle 8 and Cycle 10 contestants, Fatima Siad and Lauren Utter. Modelville aired within The Tyra Banks Show after their original appearances on America's Next Top Model.

The following former America's Next Top Model contestants were asked to be on Cycle 17, but they all declined or did not make the final cut.

Contestant	Cycle	Ranking
Tessa Carlson	1	10
April Wilkner	2	4
Shandi Sullivan	2	3
Toccara Jones	3	7
Yaya DaCosta	3	2
Lluvy Gomez	4	10
Furonda Brasfield	6	5
Jade Cole	6	3
Joanie Dodds	6	2
Melrose Bickerstaff	7	2
Natasha Galkina	8	2
Heather Kuzmich	9	5
Lauren Utter	10	6
Fatima Siad	10	3
Analeigh Tipton	11	3
Samantha Potter	11	2
Fo Porter	12	5
Aminat Ayinde	12	3
Teyona Anderson	12	1
Jennifer An	13	4-3
Erin Wagner	13	4-3
Monique Weingart	16	8
Molly O'Connell	16	2

== Prizes ==
The prizes for this cycle included a fashion spread in Vogue Italia, a cover and a spread in Beauty in Vogue, a blog on Vogue.it, and a US$100,000 contract with CoverGirl cosmetics

Additional prizes included a fashion campaign with Express, a guest correspondent placement for Extra, and the chance to be the face of an ''America's Next Top Model'' fragrance. The contract with IMG Models (present in the last 2 cycles) was removed.

== Contestants ==
(ages stated are at start of contest)

Contestant	Age	Height	Hometown	Original Cycle	Original Placement	Finish	Place
Brittany Brower	29	1.83 m (6 ft 0 in)	Tallahassee, Florida	Cycle 4	4	Episode 1	13
Sheena Sakai	24	1.78 m (5 ft 10 in)	Harlem, New York	Cycle 11	6	Episode 2	12
Isis King	25	1.70 m (5 ft 7 in)	Prince George's County, Maryland	Cycle 11	10	Episode 3	11
Camille McDonald	33	1.76 m (5 ft 9 1/2 in)	Bronx, New York	Cycle 2	5	Episode 4	10
Brittney 'Bre' Scullark	26	1.73 m (5 ft 8 in)	Harlem, New York	Cycle 5	3	Episode 6	9
Kayla Ferrel Onder	20	1.73 m (5 ft 8 in)	Rockford, Illinois	Cycle 15	4–3	Episode 7	8-7
Bianca Golden	22	1.80 m (5 ft 11 in)	Chicago, Illinois	Cycle 9	4	Episode 7	8-7
Alexandria Everett	22	1.78 m (5 ft 10 in)	Newport Beach, California	Cycle 16	4	Episode 8	6
Shannon Stewart	27	1.80 m (5 ft 11 in)	Franklin, Ohio	Cycle 1	2	Episode 9	5
Dominique Reighard	27	1.78 m (5 ft 10 in)	Columbus, Ohio	Cycle 10	4	Episode 10	4
Laura Kirkpatrick	22	1.68 m (5 ft 6 in)	Stanford, Kentucky	Cycle 13	2	Episode 12	3
Angelea Preston	25	1.80 m (5 ft 11 in)	Buffalo, New York	Cycle 14	4–3	(Disqualified)	
Allison Harvard	23	1.78 m (5 ft 10 in)	New Orleans, Louisiana	Cycle 12	2	Episode 13	2
Lisa D'Amato	30	1.73 m (5 ft 8 in)	Los Angeles, California	Cycle 5	6	Episode 13	1

== Episodes ==
No. overall	No. in season	Title	Original release date	US viewers (millions)
200	1	"Nicki Minaj"	September 14, 2011	1.96
The top fourteen All-Star contestants arrived at their Los Angeles mansion. Most of them were excited to see each other, but Camille’s arrival was received with a lukewarm reception and many did not recognize Kayla. Bianca was upset that Bre, who was her friend in real life, didn’t tell her about her participation. Soon after the introductions, Mr. Jay arrived and led them to their first photo shoot in the backyard. The photo shoot would require the contestants to embody the personalities that made them stars during their previous cycles. Shannon refused to use lingerie and chose a bikini instead, which made Jay confused. Also, Bianca was upset that she was getting red extensions for the photo shoot. Each model have embodied with their personalities. After the photo shoot, the contestants learnt that judging would take place in front of a live audience at the Nokia Theatre, a first for the series. Rap artist Nicki Minaj was the guest judge. At panel, Camille, Laura and Allison received good criticism from both the judges and the audience for embracing the personalities they had to portray while the crowd’s taunting of Alexandria greatly affected her. Dominique was criticised by the judges for looking totally feminine rather than being masculine-feminine. Brittany was criticised by the judges for being too safe in her shot. Isis was appreciated by the judges for her strong shot and angles. Tyra revealed that this week's decision was going to be based on both the photos and the audiences' comments. Isis' strong photo earned the first call out (her first ever between both cycles), while Brittany and Alexandria landed in the bottom two. It was noted that Alexandria was the only girl with negative audience comments, but the judges deemed Brittany, who received neither positive nor negative comments, as forgettable, sending her home despite taking a good photo.: Featured photographer: Celeste Canino; Special guest: Nicki Minaj, Michael Kanyon, The GAME, Phu Styles
201	2	"Ashlee Simpson"	September 21, 2011	1.60
The first shocking elimination alarmed many of the top thirteen contestants, but their scare was soon overshadowed by the announcement of their impending makeovers. Many contestants saw minimal changes, but Bre, Alexandria and Lisa had meltdowns over the cutting of their hair, though the latter two end up liking it. For this week’s photo shoot, the contestants were each given a brand word, which they tried to personify in their photo (an advertisement for Pink's Hot Dogs) and for the rest of the competition as they are using their branding words during the photo shoot. At their "Ty-Overs" (Short for Tyra inspired makeovers), Bre was upset due to getting short hairstyle. Alexandria was crying of happiness about her new, drastically shorter hair, which left the contestants confused. At panel, many contestants received praise either for their photos or for embodying their brand word well. Lisa’s devil-may-care photo and daring outfit won the judges and she received the first call-out. Conversely, Kayla and Sheena’s failure to both produce a standout photo as well as not portraying their brand well saw them in the bottom two. The judges saw more potential in Kayla sending Sheena home.: Featured photographer: Ricky Middlesworth; Special guests: Ashlee Simpson, Martin Lindstrom, Loretta Nero, Yoshi Hagiwara, Jada Fitzgerald, Craig Beaglehole
202	3	"Kristin Cavallari"	September 28, 2011	1.76
Laguna Beach star Kristin Cavallari arrived at the contestants’ mansion and talked to them about achieving real world success after a reality show. Next, the contestants met Nigel for their reward challenge, which would require them to answer questions during an interview on Extra, conducted by Mario Lopez. The contestants were divided via schoolyard pick (starting with Lisa and Bianca) into teams of six, and it was only after the groups are created that they were informed that the winning team would win immunity. Lisa’s over-enthusiasm, Angelea’s reservations and Bianca's crudeness got the thumbs down, while Allison’s to-the-point answers, Isis’ confidence and Kayla’s sincerity got the thumbs up. In the end, the team consisting of Allison, Bianca, Bre, Camille, Kayla and Shannon won immunity, with Allison winning a guest-correspondent role on Extra for being the best overall. This week’s photo shoot saw the contestants paired up (one from each of the immune and non-immune group) on stilts. Many of the non-immune contestants felt the pressure and produced stunning photos; Bianca’s fear of heights caused her to cry before the shoot, although she produced a strong shot nevertheless. At panel, Tyra noted that the non-immune were overall much better. Angelea was praised for asking Nigel to clarify how she should balance both a professional style of answering interviews while still being able to showcase her “ghetto” personality. However, her mediocre photo landed her in the bottom two with Isis. While critiquing the bottom two, Tyra noted that they were not the weakest, but because of the immunity twist, the judges had to compare who was stronger out of the two. In the end, Angelea’s photo was deemed to be marginally better, and Isis was sent home.: Featured photographer: Sarah Silver; Special guests: Kristin Cavallari, Mario Lopez, Michael Kanyon, Trey Knight
203	4	"Anthony Zuiker"	October 5, 2011	1.74
Kayla was rushed to the hospital due to a cardiac arrhythmia and mini heart attack. Afterwards, the contestants convened at the studio of CSI: Crime Scene Investigation, and met producer Anthony Zuiker, who gave them the opportunity to audition for a role as their reward challenge. Some of the girls found it hard to memorize the long medical terms. Lisa dismayed Jay for not bringing her fire on set and ultimately forgetting all of her lines. Angelea and Bre impressed with their flawless takes, but it was Bre who ultimately won a guest starring role on a CSI episode. For their photo shoot, the contestants posed with male models for a fashion campaign in Express to embody with their different personas. At panel, Allison, Angelea, Dominique, Kayla, Laura and Shannon received good feedback. Camille was criticized for not yet producing a stellar photograph throughout the season; Alexandria's photo was deemed to be "aged" while Lisa was castigated for producing a bad film. She further irked the judges when she tried to blame the male models. Angelea received the first call-out while Camille and Lisa found themselves in the bottom two, Camille for producing a bad photograph and Lisa for complaining. Tyra handed the final photo to Lisa, Camille was sent home.: Featured photographer: Alvaro Goveia; Special guests: Anthony Zuiker, Robert David Hall, Lisa Gavales, Michael Kanyon
204	5	"La Toya Jackson"	October 12, 2011	1.90
Shannon drew up a time allocation schedule for everyone's phone usage. Bianca noticed a flaw in the system, but when she tried to explain this to Shannon, Shannon teared up, believing that Bianca was attacking her. Lisa became involved in the disagreement, angering Bianca who felt that Lisa was not minding her own business. The contestants headed to Santa Monica Beach for their runway challenge. They were tasked to walk for the Kardashian Sisters Collection, which required them to jump onto a moving carousel mid-walk. Although only one winner was intended, the sisters were unable to decide between Bre and Lisa, so both contestants won an outfit from the collection. Backstage, Miss J. confronted Bianca about her negative attitude, and she explained the conflicts she was having with the other contestants. This however, upset Lisa and she confronted Bianca again, but Bre managed to mediate the situation. At the photo shoot, the contestants had to portray Michael Jackson through different stages of his life. La Toya Jackson was present at the shoot to help the contestants embody her brother. Most of the contestants impressed La Toya, but Angelea was overwhelmed due to her love of the Jackson family. At panel, most of the contestants impressed the judges, however, Angelea's photo, Bianca's bad attitude, and Lisa's attire dismayed some of the judges. Tyra surprised the contestants by revealing that it was La Toya who arranged the call-out order this week. Laura earned the first call out (her first ever between both cycles). Conversely, Angelea and Lisa found themselves in the bottom two for the second time. Tyra handed the elimination proceedings over to La Toya, who explained that her brother had a loving and giving nature, and in the same vein, both contestants would be staying, and neither was sent home.: Featured photographer: Tim Petersen; Special guests: La Toya Jackson, Kim Kardashian, Kourtney Kardashian, Khloé Kardashian, Kris Jenner, Bruce Jenner, (Note: Jenner changed her name due to gender transition in 2015.) Rushka Bergman, Fiona Stiles
205	6	"Coco Rocha"	October 19, 2011	1.94
The contestants were taken to the beach, where they were introduced to a charity initiative - they would be split into two teams of five, and will participate in a game of flag football. To make up the numbers, recently eliminated contestants Brittany, Sheena, Isis and Camille were invited back to join them. Each team was also joined by two players from the NFL: Julian Edelman, Jahvid Best, Kareem Jackson and Dante Hughes, with the winning team earning US$5,000 for their football players' charities. In addition, at undefined points during the match, Nigel called the contestants over for a photo shoot challenge with the football players. Despite falling behind early on, the Blue team, consisting of Allison, Angelea, Bianca, Bre and Laura, won the game 14-7 (and the charity money), but it was Kayla of the Red team who performed the best at the shoot and she won a photo shoot with Andre for Tyra’s website as her prize. Later, the contestants were introduced to Coco Rocha, and discovered they would be modelling with her in pairs for their bar fight-themed photo shoot. Angelea disappointed Jay by arriving on set with low energy and after some negative feedback, left the set midway through the shoot, but returned with new life and impressed Jay. Alexandria and Bre entertained everyone with their loud screaming throughout the shoot, but Jay and Coco were concerned that they were more "actors" than "models." At panel, the pair of Dominique and Lisa received top praise for their shoot and they earned the top two call-outs (this also marks the first time ever where Dominique receives a first call-out between her two cycles), while Bianca, Angelea and Allison also impressed the panel. Alexandria and Bre landed in the bottom two for their poor performance at the shoot, and both were told that they were not living up to their standards from their original cycles, but in the end, Alexandria was saved for the second time and Bre left the panel with no farewell after six collective bottom two appearances between her two cycles.: Featured photographer: Douglas Friedman; Special guests: Coco Rocha, Brittny Gastineau, Julie Henderson, Julian Edelman, Jahvid Best, Kareem Jackson, Dante Hughes, John Ruggiero, Anita Patrickson, Molly Stern
206	7	"Kathy Griffin"	October 26, 2011	2.27
This week's reward challenge saw the contestants creating their own signature fragrances and endorsing their product in front of a live audience, greeting the public in bathtubs. Alexandria irritated some of the contestants when she took a long time picking her ingredients, while Bianca refused to pose in the tub. Cycle 3 winner Eva Pigford hosted the launch party. Lisa won the challenge for her fun label and endorsement (she splashed in the tub) which granted her immunity from the next elimination. For the photo shoot, the contestants emulated reality TV stars while riding and posing on a motorcycle, each portray NeNe Leakes and Snooki, respectively. Shannon failed to portray the sassiness of her star while Kayla got distracted by screaming fans. Comedienne Kathy Griffin surprised the contestants at panel with a comedic entrance. Tyra also announced an addition to this cycle's prize package - the face of the new America's Next Top Model Fragrance. Bianca became vocally defensive when questioned about her behavior during the fragrance launch party. After the deliberations, Tyra stated that she only had seven photos in her hand (meaning two contestants would be going home). Lisa's immunity and her strong photo earned her another first call-out while Bianca, Kayla and Shannon landed to the bottom three, Shannon for being too safe and not standing out, Kayla for slowly regressing throughout the competition and Bianca for her bad attitude and behavior. After Shannon received the last photo, Bianca and Kayla were both eliminated.: Featured photographer: Mike Rosenthal; Special guests: Kathy Griffin, Eva Pigford, Ben Bennett, Glenn Nutley
207	8	"Game"	November 2, 2011	1.87
Mr. Jay announced that the top seven all-star contestants would make a music video for the week's assignment. Each of them was assigned a tune and they had 20 minutes to compose lyrics. Allison got frustrated because of her lack of a singing background. Lisa’s past song-writing experience helped her excel and ultimately won the reward challenge. The next day, Tom Polce tasked the girls to incorporate "Pot Ledom" ("Top Model" being spelled backwards) as a hook into their song. Allison had a hard time then she managed to pull it together. After the recording, Lisa earned a visit from her fiancé Adam. Later, rapper Game guided them to film their music videos. Game was impressed by Allison’s awkwardness that shone in her video, and was touched by her dedication of the song to her late father. Her stellar video earned her the first call-out, while Alexandria and Angelea landed in the bottom two for the third time each, Alexandria for her rigid and robotic movements and Angelea's lack of energy that didn’t match up to the strong lyrics of her song. Ultimately, Angelea was saved for a third time and Alexandria was eliminated in her sixth collective bottom two appearance between her two cycles.: Featured director: Gretchen Warthen; Special guests: Keenan Cahill, Madison Hohrine, Tom Polce, Anita Patrickson, Adam Friedman (Lisa's Fiancé), Game
208	9	"Nikos Papadopoulos"	November 9, 2011	1.70
André arrived at the contestants’ house and informed them that they would be travelling to Greece for the remainder of the competition. When they arrived at Athens International Airport, Miss J. and Greece's Next Top Model host Vicky Kaya tasked them to write a one-minute speech introducing themselves to the Greek Tourism dignitaries once they touch down at their Aegean Airlines flight to Crete. Almost all of the contestants committed minor faux pas. Lisa was dressed inappropriately, Allison was really great, Shannon focused too much on herself, Dominique’s nervousness showed through, Laura was too excitable and Angelea signed off crudely. All these gave Allison, the only one who did not commit any errors, the challenge win. She won a piece of Lina Fanouraki jewelry. When the contestants arrived at their new home, they were given the opportunity to collaborate with designer Michael Cinco to design their final runway gown should they make it to the final two. This week’s photo shoot required the contestants to model lingerie while posing into a giant bowl of Greek salad. Shannon refused to pose in underwear and she sat out of the shoot, while Allison’s tearing eyes and Laura’s migraine caused discomfort at their respective shoots. At panel, Dominique’s photo was universally applauded, and while Allison’s eyes were closed in her photo, she pulled off a great shot nevertheless. Laura’s erotically-charged photo didn’t sit well with the judges, especially since they felt it was contradictory to her "lovable" brand. This caused her to land in the bottom two for the first time, together with Shannon, whom the judges appreciated for standing up for her beliefs, but in the end, the judges felt that Laura's overall performance in the competition was better, and Shannon was sent home.: Featured photographer: Nikos Papadopoulos; Special guests: Vicky Kaya, Maria Kafetzaki, Dimitris Kounenakis, Lina Fanouraki, Michael Cinco, Georgina Wilson
209	10	"Exploring Greece"	November 16, 2011	1.90
The week’s reward challenge required the contestants to critique and assess each other’s modelling potential. When asked who had the least amount of potential to be America’s Next Top Model, Lisa, Laura and Allison all refused to name one person, as they felt no-one was the weakest. However, Dominique said that Angelea has the least amount of potential, owing to her lack of confidence in herself. Laura agreed with Dominique and emotionally shouted at Angelea for not knowing her worth. They got into a heated argument, causing the latter to storm out in frustration. However, when asked to statistically rate each other’s overall star-quality, Allison was ranked the weakest while Laura scored the strongest, winning the challenge. After the challenge, the contestants were brought out for a day of yachting, swimming, clubbing and drinks. This week’s photo shoot required the contestants to portray ancient Olympic sports. Angelea initially struggled, as did Allison, although the latter later managed to redeem herself later on in the photoshoot. Lisa was initially worried about portraying long jump, as the judges complained that her photos were getting repetitive, as she kept giving shots with her legs open, although she managed to perform well. At panel, all of the contestants managed to produce good shots, albeit all were met with mixed reactions from the judges. In the end, Angelea and Dominique landed in the bottom two. The judges felt that although Dominique had taken striking photos throughout the All Stars cycle, and stronger shots than Angelea overall, she was not as memorable, and whilst Angelea had a better personality, she tended to crack under pressure. However, Angelea was given yet another chance and Dominique was eliminated.: Featured photographer: Nigel Barker; Special guests: Twylem Pyper, Maria Cristina Petrone, Michael Kanyon
210	11	"Highlights"	November 23, 2011	1.02
This was the recap episode that highlighted scenes from the first ten episodes of the cycle. It also included some never-before-seen footage such as Angelea and Bianca arguing over a phone list but later gaining a mutual understanding, the girls questioning Isis about her transgender life, Bianca and Camille's verbal altercation over phone use, Alexandria and Allison chatting about the former’s super nice and sensitive tough person, Bre chiding Bianca for not contributing to household chores, Angelea’s fascination with Kim Kardashian’s butt, Lisa’s many crazy antics around the house, a day trip to the Greek island of Santorini, the contestants celebrating Laura’s 22nd birthday, and Angelea and Laura’s Greek massage (as part of Laura’s challenge win prize from episode 10).
211	12	"Tyson Beckford"	November 30, 2011	1.91
The top four all-star contestants were given a blog-writing challenge for Vogue Italia they had 3 hours to select an outfit, drive to a location and take a photo of themselves there, and head back to their mansion to write about Crete lifestyle and fashion. This week, instead of a regular photo shoot, the contestants were required to film 2 days worth of motion editorial for Tyra’s New York Times best-selling young adult novel Modelland. Laura and Lisa excelled while Allison's watery eyes gave her problems again, and Angelea struggled due to a family crisis. After the Modelland motion editorial, Allison and Laura’s short postings are well received, while Lisa failed to talk about fashion, therefore handing Angelea her first win of the cycle. She won a 7-night return trip to Crete and a gold tiara. After the blog, supermodel Tyson Beckford joined them on the second day. At panel, in what Tyra called "one of the longest deliberations ever" (the deliberation over who would go home lasted a little over 1.5 hours), Lisa and Angelea's strong performances saved them and in turn, landed Allison and Laura in the bottom two. The judges were torn over Laura, who had a bubbly personality but impressed to take high-fashion photos, and Allison, who was opposite of Laura, she is introverted shy but had a quirkiness. In the end, Allison was saved and Laura was eliminated.: Featured director: Tony Croll; Special guests: Franca Sozzani, Tyson Beckford, Michael Kanyon, Michael Cinco
212	13	"All-Star Finale"	December 7, 2011	2.39
The top three all-star contestants shot their CoverGirl Intense Shadow Blast commercial and print ad. Lisa struggled to saying "oh yes", and the strong light once again caused problems for Allison's watery eyes, although both managed to pull off commendable efforts in the end, while Angelea did well in both. The top three contestants then were photographed for Vogue Italia. All three did a good job, and then it was time for the final runway show. For the final runway show, the final three wore personally-customized gowns by Michael Cinco, and were joined by previously eliminated contestants Shannon, Dominique and Laura. The elaborate theatrics of the show required the girls to swim underwater, do a quick-change, fly in the air and walk to their music video song from episode 8. Angelea cried shortly before the show started due to the pressure. All top three contestants faced minor runway faux pas - Lisa accidentally swam to the side of the pool (instead of the ramp at the centre) to fix her mask, which fell off as the result of trying to do a flip underwater, Angelea had problems remaining underwater and Allison impressed to control with her dress due to the gushing wind. At panel, it was revealed that Angelea was disqualified by production for unspecified reasons, and that the judging was now back in Los Angeles. For the CoverGirl print ad, Allison's photo was criticized for failing to “smize” and looking vacant, while Lisa's was applauded for being alluring and flirtatious. Both were impressed for their CoverGirl commercial - Allison was too introverted while Lisa impressed to showcase her personality. For the final runway, Allison's graceful swimming was lauded, as was Lisa's command of her dress, but Allison was disparaged for her strong runway walk and Lisa for her swimming fiasco. In the final deliberations, the judges agreed that the final two had personified their brands (“unique” and “daring” respectively). The merits and drawbacks of the final two were discussed - Allison was loved by photographers and designers alike as both a model and a muse but however, her introverted personality would deem her inappropriate for the role of an Extra correspondent. Lisa's sassy and outgoing personality, as well as her progress of refinement throughout the course of the competition was appreciated, as was her superior runway walk and confidence. It was noted that whilst Lisa's may not have been the best model, she was an all-rounder, being a good singer, performer, entertainer, actress, celebrity and would easily command attention on the red carpet – a vital attribute for an Extra correspondent. However, her personality could easily come off as too tough and conceited. In the end, the second half of Modelland was shown, which revealed Lisa as the winner of America’s Next Top Model: All Stars. Lisa is the second girl (after America's Next Top Model Cycle 8 Winner Jaslene Gonzalez) in the show's history to compete on more than one cycle and win.: Featured photographers: Nikos Papadopoulos, Dusan Reljin; Special guests: Paige Cali, Michael Kanyon, Valentina Serra, Michael Cinco

== Summaries ==
=== Call-out order ===
Order	Episodes												
Order	1	2	3 (Note: In episode 3, the team of Allison, Bianca, Bre, Camille, Kayla and Shannon won the challenge and received immunity from elimination as the prize. Allison was chosen as the best of the group and won an extra prize as a result. At panel, the six immune girls were judged separately from the non-immune group.)	4	5 (Note: In episode 5, the call-out order was decided entirely by guest judge La Toya Jackson. Angelea and Lisa were called forward as the bottom two before Jackson announced neither of them would be eliminated.)	6	7 (Note: In episode 7, Lisa won the challenge and received immunity from elimination as the prize; however, this did not influence her place in the call-out order. Bianca, Kayla and Shannon were called forward as the bottom three. Tyra handed the last photo to Shannon, eliminating the other two.)	8	9 (Note: In episode 9, Shannon did not participate in the photo shoot.)	10	12	13 (Note: In episode 13, Angelea originally won the competition; however, she was then disqualified from the competition and the finale was reshot. Lisa and Allison were then revealed as the winner and runner-up, respectively.)	
1	Isis	Lisa	Allison	Angelea	Laura	Dominique	Lisa	Allison	Dominique	Laura	Lisa	Angelea	Lisa
2	Allison	Bianca	Bianca	Dominique	Shannon	Lisa	Angelea	Lisa	Allison	Allison	Angelea	Allison; Lisa	Allison
3	Camille	Alexandria	Shannon	Allison	Dominique	Bianca	Laura	Dominique	Angelea	Lisa	Allison	Allison; Lisa	
4	Lisa	Laura	Bre	Laura	Allison	Angelea	Alexandria	Laura	Lisa	Angelea	Laura		
5	Angelea	Angelea	Kayla	Kayla	Alexandria	Allison	Allison	Shannon	Laura	Dominique			
6	Laura	Dominique	Camille	Shannon	Kayla	Kayla	Dominique	Angelea	Shannon				
7	Bre	Shannon	Alexandria	Bre	Bre	Shannon	Shannon	Alexandria					
8	Bianca	Allison	Lisa	Bianca	Bianca	Laura	Bianca; Kayla						
9	Shannon	Isis	Laura	Alexandria	Angelea; Lisa	Alexandria	Bianca; Kayla						
10	Dominique	Bre	Dominique	Lisa	Angelea; Lisa	Bre							
11	Sheena	Camille	Angelea	Camille									
12	Kayla	Kayla	Isis										
13	Alexandria	Sheena											
14	Brittany												

The contestant was immune from elimination
The contestant was part of a non-elimination bottom two
The contestant was eliminated
The contestant was originally eliminated but was brought back
The contestant originally won but was disqualified
The contestant won the competition

=== Bottom two ===
Episode	Contestants	Eliminated
1	Alexandria & Brittany	Brittany
2	Kayla & Sheena	Sheena
3	Angelea & Isis	Isis
4	Camille & Lisa	Camille
5	Angelea & Lisa	None
6	Alexandria & Bre	Bre
7	Bianca, Kayla, & Shannon	Bianca
7	Bianca, Kayla, & Shannon	Kayla
8	Alexandria & Angelea	Alexandria
9	Laura & Shannon	Shannon
10	Angelea & Dominique	Dominique
11	Allison & Laura	Laura
13	Allison & Lisa	Angelea
13	Allison & Lisa	Allison

The contestant was eliminated after her first time in the bottom two
The contestant was eliminated after her second time in the bottom two
The contestant was eliminated after her third time in the bottom two
The contestant was disqualified from the competition
The contestant was eliminated in the final judging and placed as the runner-up

=== Average call-out order ===
Final three is not included.

Rank by average	Place	Model	Call-out total	Number of call-outs	Call-out average
1	2	Allison	36	11	3.27
2	1	Lisa	46	11	4.18
3	4	Laura	49	11	4.45
4	3	Angelea	51	11	4.63
5	5	Dominique	47	10	4.70
6	8-9	Bianca	39	7	5.57
7	6	Shannon	52	9	5.78
8	7	Alexandria	57	8	7.13
9	12	Isis	22	3	7.33
10	10	Bre	45	6	7.50
11	8-9	Kayla	54	7	7.71
12	11	Camille	31	4	7.75
13	13	Sheena	24	2	12.00
14	14	Brittany	14	1	14.00

=== Photo shoot guide ===
- Episode 1 photo shoot: All-Star personality
- Episode 2 photo shoot: Pink's Hot Dogs
- Episode 3 photo shoot: Modeling on stilts in pairs
- Episode 4 photo shoot: Express campaign with male models
- Episode 5 photo shoot: Michael Jackson tribute
- Episode 6 photo shoot: Catfights in a bar with Coco Rocha
- Episode 7 photo shoot: Reality stars on a motorbike
- Episode 8 music video: Pot Ledom viral videos
- Episode 9 photo shoot: Bench body underwear on a salad bowl
- Episode 10 photo shoot: Ancient Olympic athletes
- Episode 12 motion editorial: Tyra Banks' Modelland with Tyson Beckford
- Episode 13 photo shoot and commercial: CoverGirl Intense Shadow Blast print ad and Commercial, and Beauty in Vogue spread

== Angelea's disqualification ==
Following the finale, reports circulated that Angelea Preston had originally won the competition before being disqualified. In January 2013, Preston said that she had won the cycle before being stripped of the title, but did not state the reason for the disqualification.

In 2014, Preston filed a $3 million lawsuit against the show's producers, The CW and CBS, alleging that she had been wrongfully disqualified after producers learned that she had previously worked as an escort. The lawsuit claimed that Preston had originally been entitled to the cycle's prizes, including a US$100,000 contract with CoverGirl and a spread in Vogue Italia, and alleged that her past work had not violated the show's rules because it occurred before her participation in the cycle. The lawsuit was later dropped in 2018.

In 2026, Preston discussed the disqualification in E!'s documentary special Dirty Rotten Scandals: America's Next Top Model. She said that several weeks after being crowned the winner, she was told that the episode would not air because she had been disqualified for "engaging in sex work", which she said was treated as a violation of a morality clause in her contract. The finale was reshot, with Lisa D'Amato named the winner and Allison Harvard named the runner-up.

== Cast members ==
=== Additional cast ===
- J. Alexander – runway coach
- Jay Manuel – photo shoot director
