= Kayla Ferrel Onder =

Kayla Ferrel Onder is an American attorney and former reality television contestant. She appeared on Cycle 15 of America’s Next Top Model and later returned for America’s Next Top Model: All-Stars.

== Early life and modeling ==
Onder is a native of Rockford Illinois. She later moved to Peoria before auditioning for America's Next Top Model.

In 2010, she was announced as a contestant on the 15th cycle of America's Next Top Model following an audition in Chicago.

An incident during the season where she was expected to kiss a male model for a shoot was later described as one of the most controversial moments during the show's run, coming after she had previously identified herself as a survivor of sexual abuse. She reached the final four before being eliminated.

She was announced as part of the cast for show's seventeenth cycle for the America’s Next Top Model: All-Stars season, which was composed of returning contestants from earlier cycles.

Despite being viewed as one of the frontrunners, she was eliminated in episode seven which she blamed, in part, on not understanding how to portray "free" which was chosen as her branding word.

== Legal career ==
Following her appearances on Top Model, Onder became an attorney after graduating from Saint Louis University School of Law and joining Onder Law in 2014. She runs the firm's sexual abuse department.

In 2024, she and civil rights attorney Ben Crump filed a St. Louis County lawsuit on behalf of more than 30 women alleging sexual abuse by former Bridgeton pediatrician Craig Spiegel and failures by affiliated institutions to protect patients, describing the case as a “systemic failure” involving ignored warnings, red flags, and patient-safety concerns. She led a lawsuit against Buffalo Public Schools alleging failed reporting of abuse and sexual assault.
