= XOXO (brand) =

Clothing brand

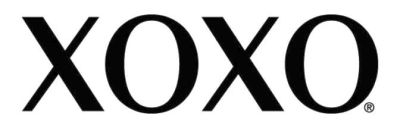

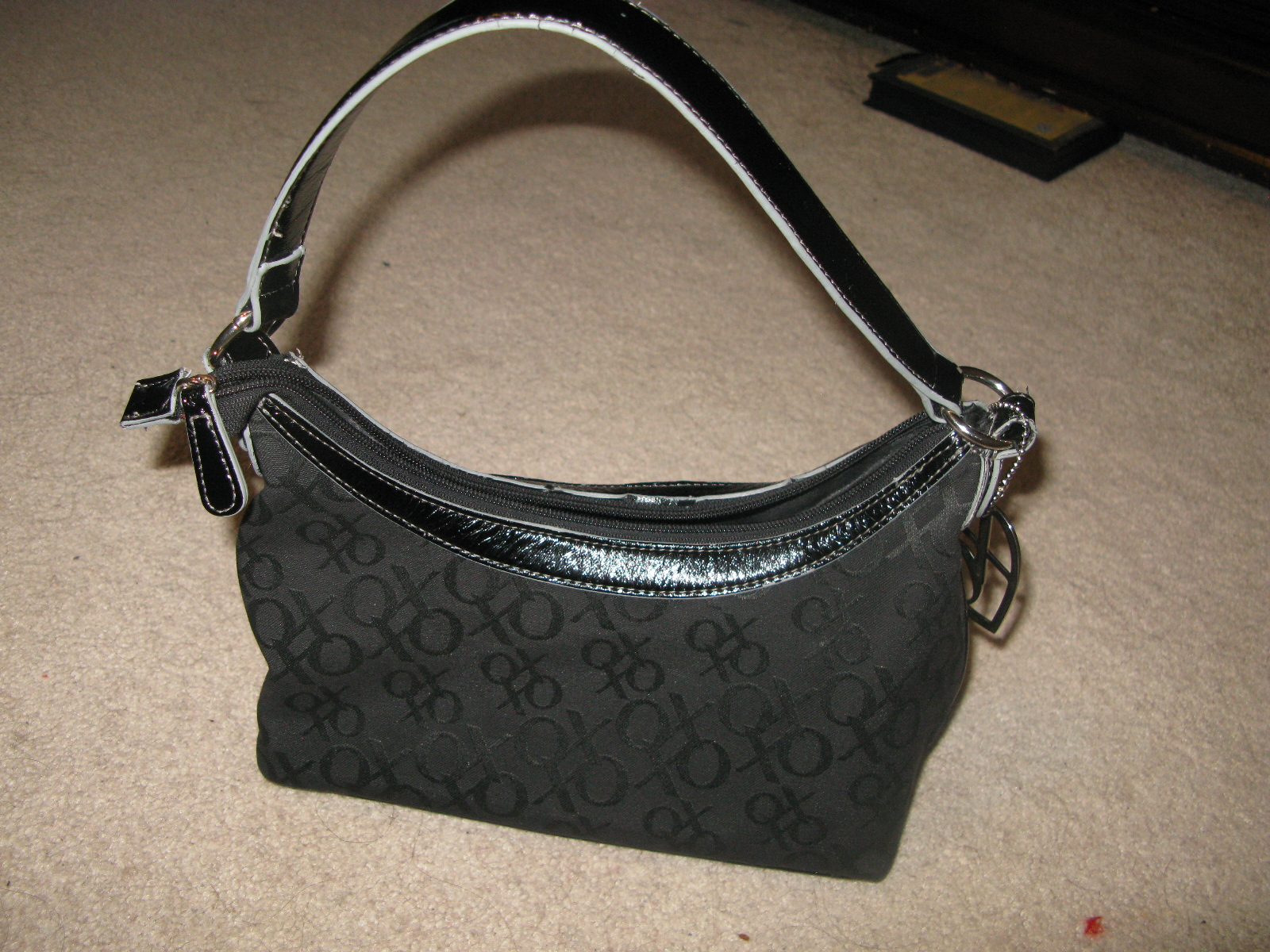
- XOXO purse
- Product type: Clothing, fashion accessories
- Current owner: Kellwood Company
- Country: United States
- Introduced: 1991
- Previous owners: Aris Industries (1999-2003); Global Brand Holdings (2003-?)
- Website: xoxo.com

XOXO is an American clothing brand of apparel and accessories (handbags, sunglasses, belts, jewelry) owned by Kellwood Company.

== History ==
XOXO was started by Gregg and Lynne Fiene in 1991 along with their partners, Marc and Michelle Bohbot (owners of Bisou Bisou). In 1999, annual sales reached $100 million but the company struggled financially. Gregg Fiene bought the Bohbot's shares and put the company on sale. XOXO was sold to Aris Industries in 1999 for $25 million. Aris cut costs down and moved the brand's production to Asia. Unable to turn a profit, Aris Industries sold XOXO to Global Brand Holding in 2003 for $43 million. Global Brand licensed the sportswear, dresses and intimate apparel to Kellwood. The equity firm Sun Capital Partners acquired Kellwood (and XOXO) in 2008, and sold it to a group of investors based in Hong Kong in December 2016.
