= Nicole Linkletter =

American model (born 1985)

- Born: Nicole Linkletter; April 18, 1985 (age 41); Grand Forks, North Dakota, U.S.
- Spouse: Adam Nathanson
- Children: 2
- Modeling information
- Height: 5 ft 9 in (1.75 m)
- Hair color: Brown
- Eye color: Blue
- Agency: Nous Model Management; L.A. Models; Ford Models; Diva Models; Dream Models; Elite Models; Paragon Models; M&P Models; Upfront Models; SMG Models

Nicole Linkletter Nathanson (born April 18, 1985) is an American fashion model and the winner of Cycle 5 of America's Next Top Model. Her prizes were a contract with Ford Models, a $100,000 contract with CoverGirl, and her photo appearing in a Ford Fusion (Americas) national advert. She is the first of two America's Next Top Model winners from North Dakota, the second being CariDee English, winner of America's Next Top Model, season 7.

== Family and education ==
Linkletter was born and raised in Grand Forks, North Dakota, the daughter of Monica and Steve Linkletter. She has two sisters.

Linkletter graduated from Grand Forks Red River High School in 2003, and attended the University of North Dakota in Grand Forks and St. Cloud State University in St. Cloud, Minnesota as a marketing major; she is currently attending California State University Northridge.

== America's Next Top Model ==
=== Winning America's Next Top Model Cycle 5 ===
Linkletter appeared on the UPN reality television show America's Next Top Model Cycle 5 after auditioning for the show at the Mall of America. She was the tenth contestants (just before Diane Hernandez, Ebony Taylor and eventual All Stars winner, Lisa D'Amato filled the final three places) chosen for the top thirteen to compete. Over her stay, Linkletter received one first call-out, was part of a non-elimination bottom two with Jayla Rubinelli and survived her second bottom two appearance over eventual All Stars contestant, Bre Scullark. In the final judging, the judges selected Linkletter over the runner-up Nik Pace.

Tyra Banks said of Linkletter, "She's got that 'It' thing." Fellow judges Twiggy and Nigel Barker likened Linkletter's look to that of an "English rose". Twiggy commented, "She has that magical something that you can't quite put your finger on. It's not enough to just be pretty." Although she had some of the best photos of the whole competition, she often did not receive as much recognition as some of the other contestants because of her seemingly "sour" facade and not breaking from pretty to beautiful in her photos.

I was always the girl who, like, never really got that much attention. And now here I am—I'm a CoverGirl and I'm a Ford model... my life is beginning right now—Nicole's life as a CoverGirl!

=== America's Next Top Model Cycle 11 ===
Linkletter appeared in a Top Models in Action segment during an episode of Cycle 11.

=== America's Next Top Model Cycle 13 ===
Linkletter appeared in a Top Models in Action segment during an episode of Cycle 13.

== Career ==
Linkletter is currently signed with Nous Model Management (L.A.); Diva Models (Singapore); Dream Models (Hong Kong); Agence Presse (Tokyo; signed by ModelScouts); L.A. Models runway division; Paragon Model Management (Mexico); M and P Model Management (London) and SMG Models.

=== Print work ===
Linkletter has appeared in editorials for American and Singaporean Elle, V, American and Malaysian Marie Claire, Nylon Mexico, Elle Girl, Cleo, Women's Health and Fitness Magazine, and Vanidades.

She has appeared in advertising campaigns for Burberry, Bebe, Christian Audigier, Forever 21, Volcom, Covergirl, Secret, Ford Fusion, and Vigoss jeans. In May 2009, she was featured in a spread for Elle Singapore. She appeared on the cover of CLEO Malaysia with two male models for May 2009 Issue. She was also featured in a spread for CLEO Malaysia for June 2009 Issue and a cover and spread in Country and Townhouse Magazine December 2009 in the UK. She has also had a cover and fashion spread for Nylon in Mexico.

=== Runway ===
Linkletter has walked for Gharani Strok Fashion show, Alice and Olivia (Fall 2006), Fashion for Life Benefit Show 2006, The Society of Young Philanthropists Gala/Fashion Show 2006, Bebe (Spring 2007), Rozae Nichols Spring 07, Juan Carlos Obando Spring 07.

=== Commercial ===
Linkletter won a $100,000 contract with CoverGirl Cosmetics. She was a guest on the internet talk show Covergirl's Talk Model, she did "My Life as a Covergirl" segments. She has also hosted a series of segments for VH1, in which she reported on Fashion Week. Linkletter has also modeled for the E! Pre-Oscar show and has appeared on E! news modeling summer shorts from Alice & Olivia. She starred in a commercial for PlayStation Portable. She has been featured in the Top Models in Action segments on America's Next Top Model, Cycle 11 and America's Next Top Model, Cycle 13.

=== Television ===
Linkletter was a finals judge at the Miss USA 2006 pageant. Her television credits include appearances on The Tyra Banks Show.

== Personal life ==
Linkletter is married to Adam Nathanson. They have 2 children together.

Preceded by Naima Mora	America's Next Top Model winner Cycle 5 (2005)	Succeeded by Danielle Evans
