= America's Next Top Model season 5 =

America's Next Top Model
- Season 5
- Cycle 5 cast
- Judges: Tyra Banks; Nigel Barker; J. Alexander; Twiggy
- No. of contestants: 13
- Winner: Nicole Linkletter
- No. of episodes: 13 + reunion

Release
- Original network: UPN
- Original release: September 21 – December 7, 2005

Additional information
- Filming dates: May 30 – July 11, 2005

Season chronology
- ← Previous; Season 4 Next → Season 6

America's Next Top Model (cycle 5) is the fifth season of the popular reality TV competition America's Next Top Model. This cycle introduced Twiggy and J. Alexander as new judges. The prizes included a contract with Ford Models, a cover in Elle Girl magazine and a spread in Elle magazine, and a $100,000 USD contract with CoverGirl cosmetics.

The international destination for this cycle was initially set to be London, U.K, making it the first time the show would be held in a primarily English-speaking international location. However, due to safety concerns following terrorist attacks in London, the final runway show was moved to Los Angeles.

The cast size was reduced from 14 to 13 contestants, a number that remained consistent until cycle 10.

The winner of cycle 5 was 20-year-old Nicole Linkletter from Grand Forks, North Dakota, then Nik Pace became the runner-up.

Lisa D'Amato, who was the seventh contestant eliminated (due to fellow contestant Cassandra Jean quitting the competition), would later return as an All-Stars contestant twelve Cycles later where she won.

== Contestants ==
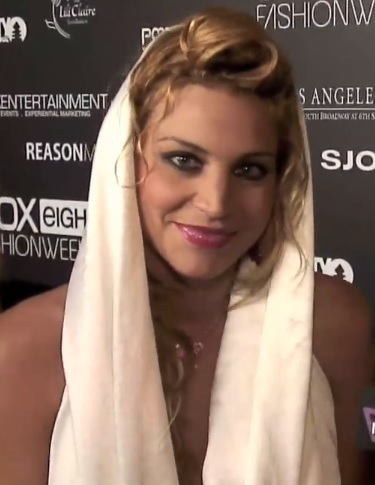
Lisa D'Amato

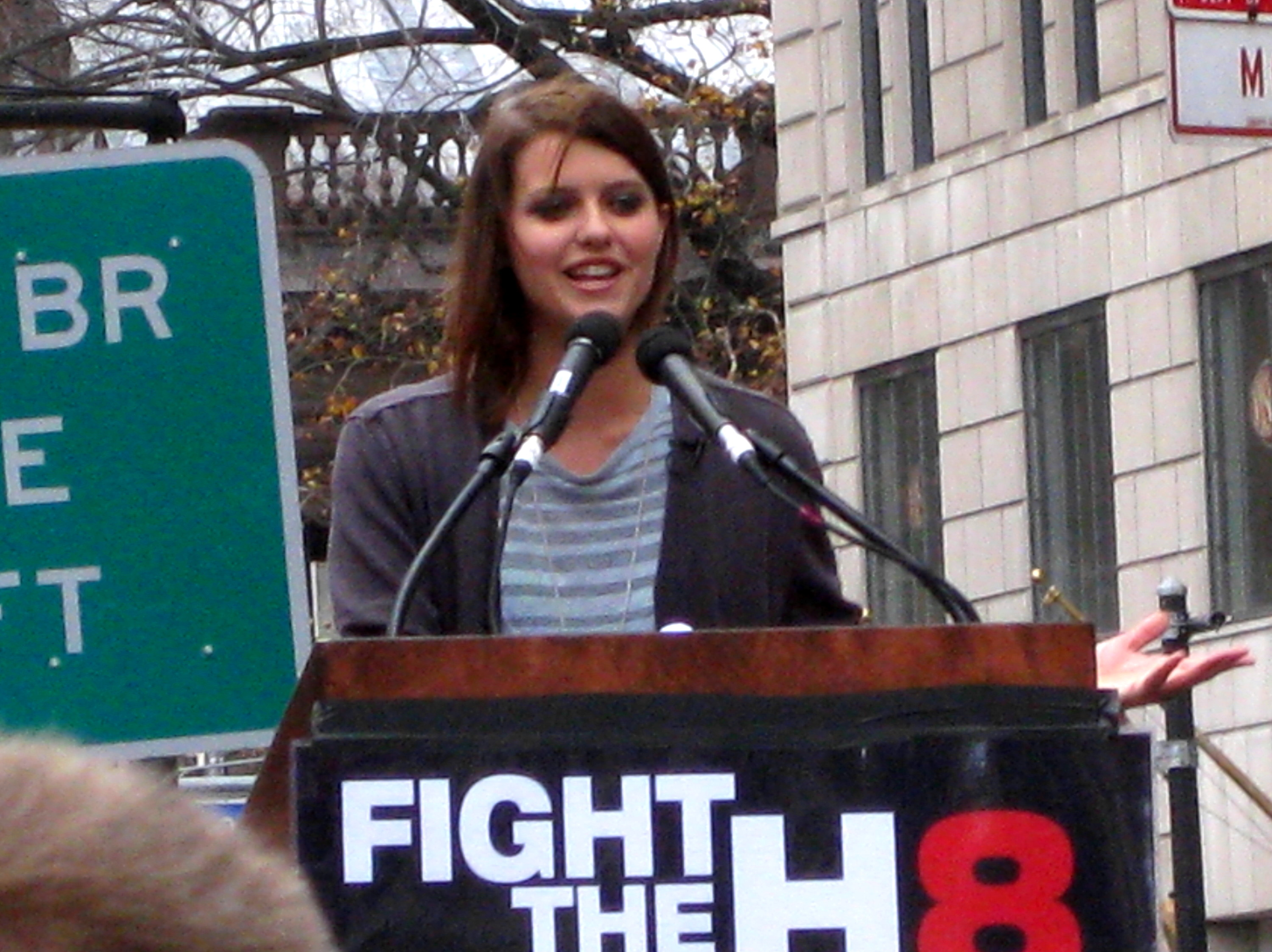
Kim Stolz

(Ages listed are at start of contest)

Contestant	Age	Height	Hometown	Finish	Place
Ashley Black	22	5 ft 8 in (1.73 m)	Fort Lauderdale, Florida	Episode 2	13
Ebony Taylor	18	5 ft 10 in (1.78 m)	Sylmar, California	Episode 3	12
Cassandra Whitehead	19	5 ft 7.5 in (1.71 m)	Houston, Texas	Episode 4	11 (quit)
Sarah Rhoades	18	5 ft 9 in (1.75 m)	Boonville, Missouri	Episode 4	10
Diane Hernandez	23	5 ft 11 in (1.80 m)	Orlando, Florida	Episode 5	9
Coryn Woitel	19	5 ft 9 in (1.75 m)	Minneapolis, Minnesota	Episode 6	8
Kyle Kavanagh	19	5 ft 10.5 in (1.79 m)	Dexter, Michigan	Episode 7	7
Lisa D'Amato	24	5 ft 8.5 in (1.74 m)	Thousand Oaks, California	Episode 10	6
Kim Stolz	21	5 ft 8 in (1.73 m)	Yorkville, New York	Episode 11	5
Jayla Rubinelli	20	5 ft 8 in (1.73 m)	Tucson, Arizona	Episode 12	4
Bre Scullark	20	5 ft 8 in (1.73 m)	Harlem, New York	Episode 13	3
Erika 'Nik' Pace	21	5 ft 8 in (1.73 m)	Atlanta, Georgia	Episode 13	2
Nicole Linkletter	20	5 ft 9.5 in (1.77 m)	Grand Forks, North Dakota	Episode 13	1

== Episodes ==
No. overall	No. in season	Title	Original release date	US viewers (millions)
47	1	"The Girl With the Twisted Catchphrase"	September 21, 2005	4.77
The casting process started out with 36 contestants who were then interviewed by Tyra Banks, and the two Jays, after a little pose-off. Notable interviews included Coryn revealing the fact that her mother struggled with depression, Nicole getting on her knees, Bre admitting she rarely showered, Jayla stating she went against her whole religion (Jehovah's Witness), and a girl named Susanna that had breast cancer. Nik was quickly judged to be similar to Naima Mora. After the interviews, the contestants were narrowed down to just 20 who were then sent to do a mock runway show. Sarah was the only girl to stumble. After that, each contestant received one on one time with Tyra, where Ebony's desire impressed Tyra, while Lisa used the time to ask Tyra about Will Smith. The judges deliberated and chose just 13 to be in the running this time.
48	2	"The Girls Become Superheroes"	September 21, 2005	4.77
After moving into their new home, the top thirteen contestants went to a party with celebrities and had to walk a runway, portraying different styles given to them by MC Nate Dogg. Sarah, who was given size 10 shoes (she wears a seven), stumbled, while Kim, who didn't know how to put on makeup, was blown off by Ashley, despite being friends. Sarah and Kim shared a kiss in the limousine on the way home. The week's photoshoot had a superhero theme. Nik, Cassandra, Jayla, and Lisa excelled but Kim, Ashley, and Sarah struggled. Coryn managed to overcome her fear of heights. During judging, the judges liked Kim's look but not her picture and Diane's face but not her pose or walk, and Twiggy criticized Jayla's and Bre's walks as well as Bre's lack of eye contact. Sarah landed in the bottom two because she lost her confidence on the runway but it was Ashley who was eliminated first because the judges felt that she was just trying to get by as a pretty girl.: Featured photographer: Mike Ruiz; Special guests: Robin Leach, Nate Dogg, Rob Talty, and Eric Howard
49	3	"The Girl Who Needs a Miracle"	September 28, 2005	4.52
The top twelve contestants received makeovers and were excited about their new looks, with the exception of Cassandra. Cassandra was upset that Tyra chose a "Mia Farrow in Rosemary's Baby"–inspired look for her and cried as her long brown hair was cut. The contestants were photographed in their new look as Jay assigned each of them a new personal style to adopt. For the week's challenge, the contestants met former club kid James St. James, who explained how to exhibit one's personal style. He then explained that the contestants would be given $500 to shop for a new outfit in Beverly Hills that demonstrated their new personal style. Lisa was declared the winner and, for her prize, she was allowed to keep the new outfit she bought as well as three items she liked from the other contestants' outfits. Lisa chose Ebony and Kim to share the prize with her and they were also allowed to keep one item from the outfits. For the week's photoshoot, each contestant was paired up with another contestant of her choosing and the two were photographed in the same country-inspired couture outfit. Ebony was annoyed with her partner Lisa's antics on the shoot and struggled to produce a great photo while Cassandra was reluctant to let go of her beauty pageant training as she posed. At judging, the contestants were called in pairs as opposed to being called individually. Tyra informed Cassandra that if she survived on to the next week, her hair would be cut even shorter to look more like Mia Farrow (the original cut was not what Tyra requested). Additionally, the judges decided that Jayla's extensions were too heavy for her face and if she survived on to the next week, she would receive a shorter haircut as well. Cassandra, Nicole, Coryn, Kim, Lisa, and Nik were declared the winners of the pairs and safe until the following week. Diane and Ebony landed in the bottom two for performing poorly at the photoshoot. Ultimately, the judges felt Ebony did not have a real future in modeling and thus she was eliminated second.: Featured photographer: Craig De Cristo; Special guests: Louis Licari, Mr. Waatani Norris, Lorgh, Latanya, Rob Talty, Erica Howard, and James St. James; CoverGirl of the Week: Lisa D'Amato
50	4	"The Girl Who Makes a Disclaimer"	October 5, 2005	4.81
Tyra stopped by to see how the top eleven contestants were doing. Miss J helped the contestants with their walks by a pool in the ritzy part of L.A. They donned fun hats and skirts and danced around the pool in order to loosen up their movements. Their challenge was to walk on a runway and pose on a turning platform for Sue Wong, and Bre won. After Kim, Nik, Jayla, Coryn, and Bre went out to eat caviar, Kim and Sarah made out in one of their beds together (seen on security camera). They also went for a swim and talked on the lawn chairs. Then the contestants posed as fashion victims. The shoot was taken on a moving platform in front of a green screen. During the shoot, Jayla and Cassandra had to get their short hair cuts. Jayla's was successful while Cassandra was unwilling to have her hair cut even shorter and she refused this assignment. In the end, Cassandra decided to quit the competition despite a huge and strong modeling potential and portfolio and being in the top three for photos for the first three weeks. Cassandra became the first girl in the history of America's Next Top Model to quit the show of her own will. In panel, Tyra asked the contestants to think very carefully if being a Top Model was something they really wanted to pursue as Cassandra's decision to quit the fifth cycle of America's Next Top Model after refusing to cut an inch of hair was mentioned before the official judging began. After the judges told the contestants about Cycle 2 contestant Camille's signature walk, the contestants were instructed to give their own signature walk. Bre impressed the judges with her walk. Jayla redeemed herself with being able to work her new look in a striking photo and received the first call-out. The judges placed Kim and Sarah in the bottom two: Kim for giving a disclaimer before demonstrating her runway walk and Sarah for her weak shoot and bad runway walk. It was Sarah who got eliminated third for lack of self-confidence.: Featured photographer: Mike Rosenthal; Special guests: Rob Talty and Sue Wong; CoverGirl of the Week: Nik Pace
51	5	"The Girl Who Gets a Boob Job"	October 12, 2005	5.47
The top nine contestants talked with Twiggy about their flaws and then took a photoshoot to show and hide them. Kyle won the challenge, which was a spa treatment with two friends. She chose Kim and Coryn. Kim expressed that she missed Sarah. Former panel judge Janice Dickinson photographed the remaining contestants in the following plastic surgery-themed photoshoot with undergone beauty enhancements. During the photoshoot, Lisa had a conversation with Janice, who told her not to "diss" the other contestants since Lisa stated that she was "by far the healthiest of the contestants," which caused Coryn to tell Janice that Lisa "dissed everyone." In the end, this caused Lisa to break down, because of what Janice said. Nik had to shoot nude because Jay, Janice, and other crew members did not like the dress that she had to wear. They decided she would shoot nude with the hair covering her as she sat down and only wore stilettos. This worried Nik as she knew her parents did not want her shooting nude. At panel Kyle wowed the judges, with judge Nigel Barker calling it "One of his favorite photos of the cycle." Nik, Coryn, and Jayla impressed the judges, but Diane failed to show her personality more and landed in the bottom two together with Bre, who wasn't strong enough to handle criticism (despite a strong photo). In the end, Bre was saved and Diane was eliminated due to lack of confidence and inability to own her curves.: Featured photographer: Janice Dickinson; Special guests: Jay Goldman, Rob Talty, Dean Factor, and, Davis Factor; CoverGirl of the Week: Nik Pace
52	6	"The Girl Who Loves Bubbles and Talk to Plants"	October 19, 2005	5.45
The top eight contestants had Iman show them how to use food to apply makeup to their faces. Later that day, they were given a three-minute interview for an organic product. Kyle won the challenge and was given a mock interview as a spokesperson for a product and picked Nicole to count down the five greatest supermodels of all time with her on The Fabulous Life of Supermodels special on VH1. After the challenge ended, tensions flared in a critical argument between Lisa and Coryn. Tyra later dropped by the house to talk to the models about vices such as smoking and drinking. The show implied that the talk was due to Lisa's actions and the concerns of the other girls around her drinking and breakdowns. Later, they had a challenge where they had to complete a commercial shoot, photoshoot, and press interview, all advertising Secret deodorant, in the space of thirty minutes. Behind the scenes, there was much drama, because Jayla stole Nik's secret on camera, making Nik and other girls upset. Originally Nik was going to say she was afraid of the dark and slept with a night light and Jayla was going to say she was afraid of the dark. Once on camera, Jayla said she was afraid of the dark and they stopped her commercial. However, when they did take two, she said she slept with a night light. This caused Nik to lose sight of her objective and ultimately deliver a bad interview. The undeclared prize was that the girl with the strongest photograph would have her picture run as an actual advertisement for the product in print media. The judges agreed that Lisa had the strongest performance this week, but they chose Nicole's photo as the best one and selected it. Meanwhile, Kim and Jayla also did well on both. Bre had a great commercial and interview but her photo was criticized. Nik's lack of focus and poor performance during her commercial landed her in the bottom two with Coryn, who was eliminated because she could not overcome her melancholy demeanor.: Featured photographer: Jason Willheim; Featured commercial director: Bill Heuberger; Special guests: Iman, Chris Spencer, Kevin Mock, and Ryan Devlin; CoverGirl of the Week: Nik Pace
53	7	"The Girls Who Are 1940s Pin-Ups"	October 26, 2005	5.48
The top seven contestants were coached in a black-and-white photoshoot with Tyra assisting them. They then went to a boot camp where they had to do all sorts of physical activities, including crawling in the mud, and then directly (without changing or showering) to a go-see with Elle Girl, a challenge which Lisa won, allowing her to meet and be taught by fashion stylist Todd Hallman. The contestants shot advertisements for Ford Fusion dressed as Vargas "pin-up" contestants. They also learned that the future winner of the cycle would have her picture run in magazines as a real ad. Most of the contestants impressed the judges; although Bre once again showed her limitations in front of the camera, it was Kyle who was sent home as she failed to show expression in her face and use the potential she had to stand out in photo shoots.: Featured photographer: Richard Dean; Special guests: Eric Viskovicz, Brandon Holley, Marie Sutter, Lori Trott, Todd Hallman, Ruth Kahn, and Rob Talty; CoverGirl of the Week: Nik Pace
54	8	"The Girl Who Wants to Step on a Pretty Flower"	November 2, 2005	4.65
A clip show/recap episode about the top thirteen contestants. It included Lisa's drinking problem and the fight between Coryn and Lisa, as well as many unseen moments from the cutting room floor.
55	9	"The Girl Whose Boyfriend Is Cheating on Her"	November 9, 2005	5.54
The top six contestants went to see a photoshoot featuring cycle 3 winner Eva Pigford and learned some valuable information from her about entourages, and proceeded to have a challenge in which they had to choose their own entourage. They had to also impress Benny Medina by doing a storyboard on their lives, which Kim won and got to guest star in an episode of Veronica Mars. The contestants then did a photoshoot with Wildboyz, who helped portray various scenarios that were meant to annoy and anger the contestants. Steve-O seemed to take a particular shine to Nicole, but Wee Man's immature personality did not sit well with Bre, and neither did Lisa's proclamation when she announced that she was going to urinate in a diaper while on-set, which Nicole was disgusted about. Meanwhile, Nik and Kim did well; Bre stepped up her game and wowed Jay and the judges and received the first call-out. Nicole and Jayla failed to impress with their photographs and were called forward as the bottom two, both for the first time ever. Tyra shocked the contestants by announcing that both contestants were "packing their bags," then revealed a picture of the Union Jack. Both contestants were still in the running to becoming the fifth winner of America's Next Top Model because everyone would be packing her bags to go to London, U.K.: Featured photographer: Nadia Pandolfo; Special guests: Benny Medina, Kristen Bell, Eva Pigford, Steve-O, Chris Pontius, Jason Acuna, Nadia Pandolfo, Samara D'Auria, Marie Suter, Terell Muller, Jonathan Hanover, Kareem Black, BJ Gillian, Jean Kwolek, Rob Talty, and Thi Chien; CoverGirl of the Week: Nik Pace
56	10	"The Girl Who Talks Behind Everyone's Back"	November 16, 2005	5.53
The six contestants got a visit from Jenny Shimizu, which inspired Kim, as well as a lesson about image where they were shown bad pictures of themselves. While Nik was phoning a friend, Kim took the phone and made a joke to the person on the other end about Nik's lack of personality, greatly irritating her. The contestants then took passport pictures, which was revealed to be a challenge, and Bre was chosen as the winner. She picked Nik to share her prize. Then each of the girls got a message from her close ones. Then they finally were on their way to their plane, much to their relief. In the limo, Kim was confronted by Nik, Jayla, and Bre about talking about people behind their backs after she caught Nik and Bre talking about her. Bre told Kim that she had an ugly character, which caused Kim to cry, and she apologized for her actions. The contestants arrived in London Heathrow Airport, and Miss J gave them a tour of London and escorted them toward a crowd of paparazzi, who ambushed and photographed them. They then moved into Savoy Hotel as their loft for the remainder of the competition and later that night two English gentlemen took Bre and Nik out on a carriage in London. Kim used this time to write an apology letter to Nik and Bre and left it on their bed to find; however, they were still not convinced about Kim's sincerity. For the shoot, the contestants posed together in a phone booth with only underwear, their galoshes, and a newspaper to cover themselves, as if they had tried to flee from the paparazzi. At judging, it was revealed that the paparazzi "attack" when they first arrived in London was a judging test and Jayla was the only girl without a bad picture. All the contestants were complimented for their phone booth shots, apart from Jayla, who was told that she blended in with the other contestants during her shoot. Whilst all the other five girls who had previously survived the bottom two were safe, Lisa was eliminated in her single bottom-two appearance as her spitfire personality came across as arrogance, despite her having a strong photo.: Featured photographer: Nick Maroudias; Special guests: Jenny Shimizu, Mark Anderson, Nick Maroudias, and Kevin Frazier; CoverGirl of the Week: Bre Scullark
57	11	"The Girl Who Retaliates"	November 23, 2005	4.72
For this week's challenge, the contestants had to pose as statues in a park. Nicole struggled being surrounded by pigeons as she had a fear of birds, which had irritated Bre, who also mentioned that Nicole's voice is annoying. Nik won and chose Jayla and Bre for the prize—a shopping spree worth $15,000 at Harrods ($10,000 for Nik and $5,000 for Bre and Jayla). Back at the hotel, Bre discovered her opened granola bars were stolen and, believing Nicole to be the one who stole them (when it was actually Lisa D'Amato, who confessed that she had stolen the granola bar in 2011), threw out her Red Bull in a sink. Kim caught Bre trying to hide the cans of Red Bull and felt uncomfortable when she knew what Bre had done. Later, the five remaining contestants then posed as modern interpretations of classical art in an advertisement for Quench body lotion by Olay. Kim told Nicole what had happened, which caused an argument between Bre and Nicole. Nicole denied touching any of Bre's possessions and wanted Bre to either replace or pay for the Red Bull she stole. Bre refused and was agitated that Kim had been gossiping again. The drama took its toll on all of the girls during the shoot, affecting Kim the most. All of the contestants, with the exception of Kim, impressed the judges on the panel with their pictures. While the judges were deliberating, Bre and Kim fought behind the scenes. Bre broke down and claimed that Kim was an "ugly person" who had an "ugly personality" and would therefore not win America's Next Top Model. When the contestants were brought back in, Nik, Jayla, and Nicole were all safe in first, second, and third places respectively. Consequently, Bre and Kim landed in the bottom two, Bre for her unprofessional behavior, despite a strong Mona Lisa photo, and Kim for her lackluster Birth of Venus photo. Tyra asked Bre if she wanted to leave, to which an emotional Bre replied "not at all", and with that Bre was saved for the third time. Due to a lack of consistency during the competition, Kim was eliminated in the top five. This elimination had upset Nicole the most as Kim was her good friend. Kim stated that she wanted to continue on with modeling as she came out with great skills as a model on America's Next Top Model.: Featured photographer: Barry Lategan; Special guests: Jason Leung and Sukeena Rao; CoverGirl of the Week: Bre Scullark
58	12	"The Girl Who Takes a Pill"	November 30, 2005	5.23
The top four contestants went on go-sees throughout London. They had to dress mod, Bollywood, preppy, and punk. Nik won the challenge and chose Nicole to share in the prize. Nicole then picked Jayla. Nik won 100 frames, Nicole won 80 frames, Jayla won 60 frames, and Bre only had 50 frames and had to shoot first and could not see herself before the photo shoot took place. Then, the contestants split into two groups to go sightseeing around London. Jayla came clean to Nik about wanting to see Nik sent home back in United States and Bre and Nicole made up, with Bre even agreeing to recompense for Nicole's energy drinks. The top four contestants traveled to the Indian neighborhood and were photographed in a Bollywood-inspired shoot to stand out in front of the crowd, reflecting the Indian influence on British fashion in recent years. Having been sick, Bre took some medicine that Jayla gave her, which made her sleepy, and she underperformed at the shoot. Nik excelled in her photoshoot, as did Nicole. Afterward, they had dinner at an Indian restaurant with Nigel who introduced them to his Sri Lankan mother and she showed them how to wear a sari properly. At panel, they had a judging test to dress in saris. Nicole and Nik once again wowed the judges with their stunning photos and were called first and second respectively. While Bre was saved for the fourth time in the bottom two, Jayla was eliminated in her third bottom-two appearance because the judges felt that she no longer believed in herself and that she wasn't strong enough to survive in the cutthroat modeling industry.: Featured photographer: Nigel Barker; Special guests: Simon Doonan, Ashley Isham, Robert Cary-Williams, Barbara Hulanicki, Sarah Feeney, Amy Molineaux, and Gillian Barker; CoverGirl of the Week: Nik Pace
59	13	"The Girl Who Is on the Cover"	December 7, 2005	6.44
In the season finale, Nik, Bre, and Nicole shot a CoverGirl commercial and stills. While Nik's strong performance was a significant improvement from her previous showing in the Secret shoot, Bre and Nicole who both previously did well in the Secret shoot struggled with their lines in the CoverGirl commercial. Nik was chosen first to continue on in the final round. Nicole landed in the bottom two with Bre, who was eliminated in her third consecutive bottom two appearance (also her fifth collective bottom two appearance of this cycle), because she was not as strong as the other two girls, despite making an improvement.: Featured photographer: Kate Martin; Nik and Nicole then shot a magazine cover with Tyra Banks, photographed by Gilles Bensimon, knowing that the winner's cover would be published in the February 2006 issue of Elle Girl. They then competed against each other in the final runway competition, in which the previous two America's Next Top Model winners Eva Pigford (cycle 3) and Naima Mora (cycle 4) participated. At the final elimination panel, the judges favored both Nicole's walk and look and Nik's final performances in the CoverGirl shoot and Nicole was subsequently selected to be the fifth winner of America's Next Top Model.: Featured photographers: Gilles Bensimon; Featured commercial director: Sara Dunlop; Special guests: Eva Pigford, Naima Mora, Gilles Bensimon, Jim De Yonker, Brandon Holly, Nargess Gharani, and Vanya Strok; CoverGirl of the Week: Nik Pace

== Summaries ==
=== Call-out order ===
Order	Episodes												
Order	1 (Note: In episode 1, the pool of 36 girls was reduced to 13. This call-out order does not reflect their performances that week.)	2	3	4 (Note: In episode 4, Cassandra quit the competition during the photo shoot.)	5	6	7	9 (Note: In episode 9, Jayla and Nicole landed in bottom two. Neither of them was eliminated, as both Cassandra's choice to quit and Sarah's elimination during the same week had forced a non-elimination episode.)	10	11	12	13	
1	Cassandra	Nik	Cassandra	Jayla	Kyle	Lisa	Kim	Bre	Kim	Nik	Nicole	Nik	Nicole
2	Nik	Lisa	Nicole	Kyle	Jayla	Jayla	Lisa	Kim	Bre	Jayla	Nik	Nicole	Nik
3	Kyle	Cassandra	Coryn	Nik	Nik	Kim	Nik	Nik	Nicole	Nicole	Bre	Bre	
4	Ashley	Diane	Kim	Bre	Lisa	Nicole	Jayla	Lisa	Nik	Bre	Jayla		
5	Bre	Jayla	Lisa	Lisa	Nicole	Kyle	Nicole	Jayla; Nicole	Jayla	Kim			
6	Kim	Kyle	Nik	Diane	Kim	Bre	Bre	Jayla; Nicole	Lisa				
7	Sarah	Bre	Bre	Coryn	Coryn	Nik	Kyle						
8	Jayla	Ebony	Jayla	Nicole	Bre	Coryn							
9	Coryn	Coryn	Sarah	Kim	Diane								
10	Nicole	Nicole	Kyle	Sarah									
11	Diane	Kim	Diane	Cassandra									
12	Lisa	Sarah	Ebony										
13	Ebony	Ashley											

Eliminated
Quit the competition
Part of a non-elimination bottom two
Won the competition

=== Bottom two ===
Episode	Contestants	Eliminated
2	Ashley & Sarah	Ashley
3	Diane & Ebony	Ebony
4	Kim & Sarah	Cassandra
4	Kim & Sarah	Sarah
5	Bre & Diane	Diane
6	Coryn & Nik	Coryn
7	Bre & Kyle	Kyle
9	Jayla & Nicole	None
10	Jayla & Lisa	Lisa
11	Bre & Kim	Kim
12	Bre & Jayla	Jayla
13	Bre & Nicole	Bre
13	Nicole & Nik	Nik

Eliminated after her first time in the bottom two
Eliminated after her second time in the bottom two
Eliminated after her third time in the bottom two
Eliminated after her fifth time in the bottom two
Quit the competition
Eliminated in the final judging and placed as the runner-up

=== Average call-out order ===
Casting call-out order and final two are not included.

Rank by average	Place	Model	Call-out total	Number of call-outs	Call-out average
1	11	Cassandra	4	2	2.00
2	2	Nik	34	11	3.09
3	6	Lisa	29	8	3.63
4	4	Jayla	38	10	3.80
5	1	Nicole	48	11	4.36
6	3	Bre	51	11	4.63
7	5	Kim	42	9	4.67
8	7	Kyle	31	6	5.17
9	8	Coryn	34	5	6.80
10	9	Diane	30	4	7.50
11	12	Ebony	20	2	10.00
12	10	Sarah	31	3	10.33
13	13	Ashley	13	1	13.00

=== Makeovers ===
- Bre - Straightened with bangs
- Cassandra - Mia Farrow inspired pixie cut and dyed blonde; never fully achieved
- Coryn - Long golden blonde extensions with matching eyebrows
- Diane - Dyed wheat-colored with bangs
- Ebony - Brandy inspired long micro braids
- Jayla - Long straight black extensions; later, pixie cut
- Kim - Dyed red
- Kyle - Long straight chocolate brown extensions
- Lisa - Cut shorter and dyed chocolate brown; later, re-dyed blonde
- Nicole - Long curly brown weave
- Nik - Dyed sun-kissed blonde and eyebrows lightened
- Sarah - Asymmetrical chin-length bob

== Post-Top Model careers ==
- Ashley Black has modeled for hair care products and is currently an on-air personality for 93 Rock.
- Ebony Taylor walked in various fashion weeks but left modeling to return to college. She competed in the 2010 Miss California pageant, where she won one of three preliminary evening dress awards. Ebony also supported her sister, Angel Taylor, during her audition for The Voice.
- Cassandra Whitehead has worked with UPN and ventured into television acting. She appeared in films such as Fast & Furious (2009) and 2 Dudes and a Dream (2009). Cassandra later competed on 1 vs. 100, winning $500,000. She married Canadian actor Stephen Amell on December 25, 2012, while on vacation in the Caribbean.
- Sarah Rhoades returned to her career as a ballet dancer and currently works as a company artist for the Atlanta Ballet.
- Diane Hernandez signed with Wilhelmina Models and has been featured in Silhouette, Marianne, and Vogue.it.
- Coryn Woitel has modeled for FingerHut.
- Kyle Kavanagh pursued some modeling opportunities in Los Angeles.
- Lisa D'Amato signed with L.A. Models and MI Models under their talent division. She has modeled for various brands, released two singles, and appeared in Celebrity Rehab with Dr. Drew. Lisa was also the winner of cycle 17, an all-star season featuring past competitors.
- Kim Stolz signed with Elite Model Management and worked for several brands before becoming a correspondent for MTVu. She has modeled for Ford Models and transitioned from modeling to working in finance as an intern at Citigroup and Bank of America.
- Jayla Rubinelli has modeled for brands like New York Couture, Ganett, and Zitomer, and appeared in the Great Guns 2008 Calendar and Tucson Lifestyle.
- Bre Scullark signed with Ford Models and appeared in commercials and print ads. She also competed in America's Next Top Model, cycle 17, where she placed 10th.
- Nik Pace signed with Fusion Model Management and modeled for brands like Snuggle, Us Weekly, and Soft Sheen Carson. She is now signed with Ford Models and appeared in a hair styling video by the agency. In September 2009, she gave birth to a boy.
- Nicole Linkletter is signed with Nous Model Management in L.A., and various international agencies including Upfront Models in Singapore, Models in Hong Kong, Agence Presse in Tokyo, and Paragon Model Management in Mexico.
