= America's Next Top Model season 8 =

America's Next Top Model
- Season 8
- Judges: Tyra Banks; Nigel Barker; J. Alexander; Twiggy
- No. of contestants: 13
- Winner: Jaslene Gonzalez
- No. of episodes: 12

Release
- Original network: The CW
- Original release: February 28 – May 16, 2007

Additional information
- Filming dates: October 23 – December 13, 2006

Season chronology
- ← Previous; Season 7 Next → Season 9

The eighth cycle of America's Next Top Model aired from February 28, 2007, to May 16, 2007, and was the second season of the series to be aired on The CW network.

The winner, similar to all of the cycles aired on The CW network, received representation by Elite Model Management, a cover and six-page spread within Seventeen magazine, and a US$100,000 contract with CoverGirl cosmetics.

The international destination during this cycle was Sydney, Australia, the show's first visit to Oceania.

The cycle's promotional tagline was "Welcome to the Jungle, Ladies" and the promotional theme songs were both Danity Kane's "One Shot" and Shiny Toy Guns' "Le Disko".

The winner was 20-year-old Jaslene Gonzalez from Chicago, Illinois, who notably had made it to the Top 50 of Cycle 7, but was not cast. Gonzalez was the first Hispanic woman to win ANTM. She also became the first winner to compete on more than one cycle as well as have no bottom two appearance. Natasha Galkina placed as the runner up this season.

The cycle's finale episode attracted more than 6.6 million viewers, a record for both the franchise and the CW.

== Contestants ==
(Ages stated are at start of contest)

Contestant	Age	Height	Hometown	Finish	Place
Kathleen DuJour	20	5 ft 11 in (1.80 m)	Brooklyn, New York	Episode 1	13
Samantha Francis	19	5 ft 11 in (1.80 m)	Pinson, Alabama	Episode 2	12
Cassandra Watson	24	5 ft 11 in (1.80 m)	Seattle, Washington	Episode 3	11
Felicia Provost	19	5 ft 9 in (1.75 m)	Houston, Texas	Episode 4	10
Diana Zalewski	21	6 ft 1 in (1.85 m)	Garfield, New Jersey	Episode 5	9
Sarah VonderHaar	20	5 ft 9 in (1.75 m)	Lake Zurich, Illinois	Episode 6	8
Whitney Cunningham	21	5 ft 10 in (1.78 m)	West Palm Beach, Florida	Episode 7	7
Jael Strauss †	22	5 ft 11.25 in (1.81 m)	Detroit, Michigan	Episode 8	6
Brittany Hatch	21	5 ft 11 in (1.80 m)	Savannah, Georgia	Episode 10	5
Dionne Walters	20	5 ft 11 in (1.80 m)	Montgomery, Alabama	Episode 11	4
Renee Alway	20	5 ft 10.5 in (1.79 m)	West Branch, Michigan	Episode 12	3
Natasha Galkina	21	5 ft 9 in (1.75 m)	Dallas, Texas	Episode 12	2
Jaslene Gonzalez	20	5 ft 8 in (1.73 m)	Humboldt Park, Illinois	Episode 12	1

== Episodes ==
No. overall	No. in season	Title	Original release date	US viewers (millions)
85	1	"The Girl Who Won't Stop Talking"	February 28, 2007	5.36
In Episode 1, the 33 contestants were sent to Los Angeles, and were immediately thrown into model boot camp. They met Jay Manuel and J. Alexander, who tested them with a quick photo shoot and a quiz on fashion-related knowledge. Sarah impressed the Jays and won the posing challenge. Later that day, they met Tyra. After the boot camp, the top forty told Tyra, Jay and Miss J more about themselves. Returning applicant Jaslene (who initially did not make it to the previous cycle) gave comments about her past. Some memorable auditions included Micheline, who had at least 20 tattoos on her body; Natasha, who revealed she'd married a man in his forties at 18; and Dionne, who called her hair color "1B-30". The top 20 contestants were photographed at a party hosted by Marc Ecko, before the top thirteen (including Jaslene) were chosen. The top thirteen contestants had their first photo shoot, dealing controversial political issues. Samantha and Whitney agreed to decide to take a photo shoot together. After the photo shoot, the contestants moved to their new mansion. For the week's reward challenge, the top thirteen contestants were taken to a Goodwill thrift shop. They were given three minutes to put together an outfit that reflected their personal style. After a runway show featuring their outfits, each outfit was auctioned to raise money for Goodwill. Jael's received the highest bid. Her reward was to sign her name on the ceremonial check given to the charity for the vocationally challenged. Jael won the opportunity to be dressed by Phillip Bloch before meeting the judges. Only Jaslene, Felicia, Samantha, Cassandra, and Brittany pulled off good photos, while the rest failed to impress. The judges criticized Jael for her apparent fear of success. Jael felt she may be hated by the other contestants for potentially winning future challenges. Despite several contestants producing unsatisfactory pictures, Jael and Kathleen were the bottom two contestants for having the worst photos of the bunch. It was Jael who got saved for displaying more potential, by winning the challenge, and having a stronger photo. Kathleen was the first contestant eliminated due to her inability to follow direction from photographer, Nigel Baker.: Featured photographer: Nigel Barker; Special guests: Johnta Austin, Jermaine Dupri, Russell Baer, Marc Ecko, Phillip Bloch
86	2	"The Girls Go to Prom"	March 7, 2007	4.46
In Episode 2, the top twelve contestants were greeted by J. Alexander and a marching band at a high school before they were divided into teams. They were taught a runway-walking routine based on timing and precision. After the rehearsal, they met fashion show producer, Roy Campbell. He introduced them to their next challenge – a prom fashion show. The show consisted of three styles each: (1) modern/ contemporary; (2) the 1980's; and (3) ghetto fabulous. Sarah's wardrobe malfunctioned. Although she was commended for not allowing that to affect her walk, Sarah was criticized for not covering up in front of the students. Brittany won the runway challenge and received a trophy. Although Samantha did not win, she expressed her happiness for being there as she had missed her own prom. The next day, the contestants returned to the high school for a photoshoot, where Jay Manuel assigned each of them different high school clichés. Jaslene stood out and was called first once again. Felicia and Diana impressed the judges, Natasha and Samantha struggled to fit into their characters, and they landed in the bottom two. Natasha was criticized for her inability to transfer her beauty into a photograph. Natasha was told her photo was worse than Ann Markley's first photo from Cycle 3. The judges saw Samantha as inexperienced. Tyra handed the last photo to Natasha because of her positive attitude, thus making Samantha the second girl eliminated.: Featured photographer: Carlos Rios; Special guests: Roy Campbell, Hallie Bowman; CoverGirl of the Week: Jaslene Gonzalez
87	3	"The Girl Who Cries all the Time"	March 14, 2007	5.16
In Episode 3, the top eleven contestants traveled to a Beverly Hills salon for their makeovers. While most of the contestants liked their new looks, a lot of pain came with Brittany's new hair weave. The long weave originally planned for Jael was taken out, after eight hours in the salon. Back at the house, Brittany complained that her new weave made her itch. This irritated Whitney since, as a black woman, had tolerated her weave for many years. Later, Jael received a devastating phone call, discovering that one of her close friends had died of a drug overdose. The contestants participated in a challenge to test their ability to apply makeup, which Brittany won and shared her Seventeen photoshoot prize with Jael and Sarah. It was announced Cassandra would have won, had she not been late. For the photoshoot, the contestants posed nude, decorated with various types of candy. At judging, the judges were impressed by Brittany's "editorial" photograph and learned of the tragic death of Jael's friend. Most contestants received praise for their improvements, particularly Natasha for somewhat improving. The judges criticized Jaslene for losing her "spicy personality." The judges were disappointed with Cassandra's picture, seeing that she had not stepped up to the plate at all. With that, Cassandra landed in the bottom two with Diana, who had a hard time posing her plus-sized body. In the end, the judges felt that Cassandra was not able to transfer her inner and outer beauty into a photo and she was eliminated third.: Featured photographer: Joseph Cultice; Special guests: Neeko, Roxanna Floyd, Carissa Rosenberg; CoverGirl of the Week: Jaslene Gonzalez
88	4	"The Girl Who Changes Her Attitude"	March 21, 2007	5.04
In Episode 4, the top ten contestants met posing instructor, Benny Ninja, who taught the art of "voguing", using type of their poses. They were put to the test when they had to maneuver their way through a laser maze within two minutes while being judged on their posing. Renee was the only contestants to fail the task. Whitney won her first challenge, and her reward was a US$40,000 bracelet from Angara. For the week’s photoshoot, the contestants posed as crime scene victims. They were to appear "alive" in their photos, while looking "dead". At the end of the photo shoot, Jay Manuel commented that the judges would have a hard time deliberating during panel. He felt each of the contestants exceeded his expectations in delivering strong photos for judging. As predicted, most of the contestants received positive feedback from the judges, with the exception of Dionne and Felicia. Dionne was critiqued on not taking enough initiative to produce great shots. The judges felt Dionne was depending upon the creative director and photographer to position her. Felicia was unable to bring life into her film. While deliberating, Dionne was also chastised for not looking like a model in person. They felt Felicia produced the weakest photo in the bunch, resting on good critiques at previous panels. In the end, despite having a stronger portfolio overall, Felicia was eliminated because she was getting weaker as the weeks passed. This proves that, on this show, only one bad photo may have a contestant eliminated.: Featured photographer: Mike Rosenthal; Special guest: Benny Ninja; CoverGirl of the Week: Jael Strauss
89	5	"The Girl Who Takes Credit"	March 28, 2007	5.32
In Episode 5, the top nine contestants learned about fashion appeal. They met with Elite Model Management director, Cathy Gould. Cathy taught the contestants what not to wear and what outfits were considered “top model” standard. After this, the contestants were divided into groups of three and put to the test. Their challenge, judged by two fashion mavens, was to assemble their own clothing line and be their own mannequins. When they were called to pose, Whitney ignored Natasha’s reminder. Instead, Whitney sat on the floor, outside the designated posing platform. Thus, she disqualified herself and her group. They were then told that their group would have won. They selected Sarah as the next best and she won her first reward: double the frames for the week’s photoshoot. When Sarah claimed all the credit, this angered Dionne and Renee, who had chosen her outfit for her. Sarah discussed how she saw a top she wanted to wear and knew she had to wear it. In fact, Sarah did not choose any part of her outfit at all. For the week’s photoshoot, contestants were excited when they saw male models on set. However, they were surprised to hear they were drag queens. The drag queens would pose as women, and the contestants would pose as men. (Note: One of the men posed as future RuPaul's Drag Race season two contestant Raven.) While Brittany and Jaslene again impressed Jay with their shots, the real shock of the day came from Natasha, who wowed everyone on set. Not only did Natasha achieve a great photo, she also incorporated some ideas of her own, such as including grills from a gum wrapper and a toothpick. Diana and Whitney struggled with their plus-size bodies, and landed in the bottom two. The judges felt that Diana had no fire. When Jay Manuel asked why she wanted to be a top model, she answered "just 'cause." Whitney was unable to take good picture. In the end, the judges decided that passion was more important than the portfolio. Thus, they gave Whitney a second chance. Diana was eliminated fifth.: Featured photographer: Richard Reinsdorf; Special guests: Cathy Gould, Deda Coben, Raven, Claudia Mason; CoverGirl of the Week: Whitney Cunningham
90	6	"The Girl Who Gets Thrown in the Pool"	April 4, 2007	5.22
In Episode 6, the top eight contestants met Twiggy and cycle 7’s Melrose Bickerstaff. They were told to assign themselves nicknames and they would be use these to introduce themselves at a party. The event was to be attended by many industry influential people. Jael overly irritated rapper 50 Cent and he pushed her in the pool. Natasha jumped in after her. Later, the two were embarrassed when they met Tyra’s manager, Benny Medina, for an interview as they were soaking wet. Nicole Richie gossiped to Jael that Renee hated her. This led to a fight between Jael and Renee. The week’s photo shoot required the contestants to do their own hair and makeup, in order to show four sides of their personalities. Dionne impressed Benny the most at the party. After the shoot, Dionne, won the reward of a spread for Keds in Seventeen magazine. Dionne chose Jaslene and Whitney to accompany her. The next day, Tyra chatted with the contestants in person. Renee was criticized by each of the contestants. Tyra managed to mediate the problem and allowed Renee to air her grievances. Renee confessed that, due to a troublesome, abusive childhood, she had a tendency to lash out at people. At panel, Jael, Natasha, Dionne, Brittany, and Renee all received praise. Jaslene was criticized for making all four of her personalities look the same. The judges felt that Sarah had yet to step out of her comfort zone. Whitney did not produce a stellar photo once again. Thus, Sarah and Whitney landed in the bottom two. Whitney was given one last chance as Sarah’s overly posed photos sent her home.: Featured photographer: Kareem Black; Special guests: 50 Cent, Melrose Bickerstaff, Nicole Richie, Paris Hilton, Beverly Johnson, Nancy Josephson, Nikki Haskell, Larry Sanitsky, Benny Medina, Tia Mowry, Tamera Mowry, Bill Maher, Markus Klinko and Indrani, Jennifer Weiderman; CoverGirl of the Week: Natasha Galkina
91	7	"The Girl Who Impresses Pedro"	April 11, 2007	5.65
In Episode 7, the top seven contestants received a crash course in character acting from actress, Tia Mowry. They were immediately thrown into an acting challenge with Efren Ramirez, who portrayed Pedro in the film, "Napoleon Dynamite." Renee was picked as the best actress. She chose Dionne to share in her prize of a custom-made t-shirt. However, the real prizes were surprise visits from their families. Natasha became emotional due to missing her daughter. Despite being down, Natasha was able to get past this and was able to model (as Mr. Jay puts it) "like a professional." Excitement rose when contestants from past cycles of America's Next Top Model showed up for their next photo shoot. The current cycle girls were to portray memorable moments from past contestants' ANTM appearances. At panel, Dionne, Natasha, and Brittany impressed the judges with their outstanding photographs. Jael landed in the bottom two for being too mechanical at the shoot. Jael also failed to express herself eloquently at panel. Whitney fell in the bottom two for failing again to deliver a good photo, despite her high intelligence. However, the judges felt that Jael's portfolio was more impressive, Therefore, Whitney was eliminated in her third consecutive bottom two appearance. She was unable to effectively translate her beauty and (as Tyra put it) "spark" into photographs.: Featured photographer: Matthew Jordan Smith; Special guests: Tia Mowry, Efren Ramirez, Rebecca Epley, Kim Stolz, Joanie Dodds, Michelle Deighton, Bre Scullark, Michelle Babin, Amanda Babin, Shannon Stewart, Christian Marc; CoverGirl of the Week: Jaslene Gonzalez
92	8	"The Girls Go Down Under"	April 18, 2007	5.20
In Episode 8, the top six contestants received a crash course in interviewing from cycle 2 contestant, April Wilkner, and comedian, Gary Riotto. The next day, when April was preparing for a challenge, Tyra showed up. Tyra was wearing a kangaroo jumpsuit and was accompanied by the zookeepers. She revealed to the contestants that their international destination was Sydney, Australia. Upon landing, the contestsnts were met by Erika Heynatz and immediately tasked to interview the locals on American fashion faux pas, using as much Australian slang in Downtown Sydney as possible. Natasha won the challenge. She won the opportunity to be a correspondent for The Tyra Banks Show. In this week's episode, instead of a photo shoot, the contestants were in a CoverGirl commercial at Hyde Park. They were instructed to talk in an Australian accent. Tyra was surprised that Natasha was able to cover her thick Russian accent with a commendable Australian accent. Natasha was able to pull off "Steve Irwin" in her take. Brittany struggled to remember her lines because of her short-term memory loss (due to a car accident a few years ago). She landed in the bottom two with Jael. Jael also had a lackluster take. In the end, despite Jael's take still being better than Brittany's, Jael was eliminated in her third bottom two appearance. The judges valued Brittany’s previous photographs which were strong.: Featured commercial director: Simon Higgins; Special guests: April Wilkner, Erika Heynatz, Gary Riotto, Nick Hudson; CoverGirl of the Week: Natasha Galkina
93	9	"The Girl Who Picks a Fight"	April 25, 2007	3.87
Episode9 was the season's recap episode. Never-before-seen footage included the contestants making a mock runway show called "Top Model High Fashion Show." Jael followed Renee with a pair of pom-poms. Dionne and Renee had a heated argument. Natasha and Renee bonded while cleaning the house. Cassandra went to the hospital for frostbite, following the nude "candy-coated" photo shoot. Natasha had a tooth removed.
94	10	"The Girl Who Blames the Taxi Driver"	May 2, 2007	5.23
In Episode 10, Renee and Dionne expressed their shock that Brittany used her short- term memory loss as a way to escape elimination despite Jael being in the bottom two three times. The top five contestants were sent on go-sees all around Sydney and were given a time limit of four hours. Natasha and Brittany arrived back at the modeling agency late. Thus, they were disqualified. Natasha, who was just one-minute late accepted it gracefully. Brittany, on the other hand, threw her portfolio on the ground, cursed and yelled at Natasha to "shut up", and blamed the taxi driver for not meeting her at the designated area. Everyone inside the agency, including challenge administrator, Priscilla Leighton Clark, could hear Brittany expressing her displeasure with her disqualification right in front of Natasha. Jaslene impressed the clients the most and won the challenge. She chose Dionne to accompany her to share a photo shoot on top of the famous Sydney Harbour Bridge with photographer, Nigel Barker. At the photo shoot, the contestants worked a swimsuit in two ways: (1) Tyra shot them in sensual poses for a women's magazine; and (2) then they struck sexy poses for a men's magazine. Tyra was impressed with Jaslene's variety of poses. However, Tyra was disappointed with Dionne after Dionne had to be coached through the entire photo shoot. At panel, everyone (except for Dionne) was hailed for their photos. Natasha, for seven weeks in a row, impressed the judges for her great photos. Tyra revealed that she was shocked that none of the go-see designers wanted to hire Brittany, despite a stellar portfolio.(Ms. Jay revealed that Brittany is the first contestant in ANTM history to have disinterested designers.) Ultimately, Dionne's lackluster photos and Brittany's poor go-see performance landed them in the bottom two. In the end, despite never placing below fifth, it was Brittany's poor go-see performance that had her eliminated ninth in her second consecutive bottom two appearance.: Featured photographers: Tyra Banks, Michael Omm; Special guests: Jodhi Meares, Priscilla Leighton Clark, Wayne Cooper, Lill Boyd, Anna Hewett, Tina Kalivas, Jayson Brunsdon, Arabella Ramsay, Alice McCall, Kit Willow, David Sciola, Brad Rope, Adrian Allen, Tamati Williams, Samuel Sirena; CoverGirl of the Week: Natasha Galkina
95	11	"The Girl Who Does Not Want to Dance"	May 9, 2007	4.92
In Episode 11, the top four contestants visited aboriginal teachers. They were given a lesson on self-expression and storytelling through dance. They decorated themselves and their costumes with traditional body paint, before relating their life stories to a crowd. While the cold irritated Dionne, Renee embraced the dance and subsequently won the challenge. She picked Jaslene to share in her prize of pearl jewelry. That night, Renee, Dionne, and Jaslene hit the town, while Natasha stayed home sick. Renee, Dionne, and Jaslene took the opportunity to talk behind Natasha's back. They questioned whether or not Natasha even had a husband and child. This culminated in Renee stating that they needed to have Natasha eliminated. At the photo shoot, each girl expressed herself through aboriginal dance. At judging, only Renee received unanimous praise. Jaslene's photo received lukewarm remarks as her latest photo was reminiscent of her first photo shoot. Thus, they questioned Jaslene's versatility. Both Dionne and Natasha were criticized for weak photos. Natasha was criticized more for having the weakest photo out of the top four contestants. Things got heated when the contestants ganged up on Natasha. Tyra asked everyone who they felt had the most and least amount of potential. Despite being singled out for having the least potential, Natasha held her cool and handled the situation well. Dionne and Natasha landed in the bottom two, where Tyra lambasted Dionne for not improving enough. Tyra also did not like that Dionne picked Jaslene (after Tyra had asked who had the most potential). Natasha was criticized because she didn't manage to hide her illness during the photo shoot. It produced her worst photo to date. In the end, the judges felt that Natasha's "body of work was stronger than Dionne's." The judges dismissed the other contestants' criticism against Natasha as jealousy. Dionne was sent packing after three bottom two appearances.: Featured photographer: Kane Skennar; Special guests: Carissa Rosenberg, Uncle Max, Calita Murray, Justin Schwarz, Sharon Williams; CoverGirl of the Week: Jaslene Gonzalez
96	12	"The Girl Who Becomes America's Next Top Model"	May 16, 2007	6.42
In Episode 12, the top three contestants were put to the test when they had to shoot a CoverGirl commercial and print ad. For the commercial, the contestants were told to ad-lib. Natasha initially wrote a script. She later dropped it so her voice would sound more natural. Jaslene was impressive, speaking Spanish in her commercial. All the contestants were praised, but the judges noted differing weaknesses in them. Natasha gave a natural smile only when she was laughing. Jaslene's picture looked like a yearbook photo. Renee's photos looked old. Despite having a strong commercial and previous strong performances, Renee was eliminated in her first-ever bottom two appearance. Natasha joined Jaslene after surviving three bottom two appearances.: Featured photographer: Jim De Yonker; The next day, the final two contestants, shot their covers for Seventeen magazine. Jaslene expressed her surprise of Natasha being in the final two over Renee. Tyra visited both contestants for one-on-one sessions before they prepared for the final runway challenge. Cycle 7 winner CariDee English joined Jaslene and Natasha in the runway show, themed "evolution" for Australian fashion label sass & bide. Jaslene began with a weak walk but ended up strong and natural. Natasha had a wardrobe malfunction backstage. The production went smoothly. The judges were also impressed by Natasha's professional handling of the situation when her skirt fell while on the runway. At the final judging, the panel saw both finalists as winners. However, they were divided over their preference of the finalists' walks. Natasha's striking look got the thumbs up, but her ability to learn was both lauded and questioned. Jaslene's photos received universal praise, though there was a concern for her commercial ability. The judges were also torn between Natasha's astounding progress and Jaslene's overall consistency. After long deliberation, the finalists were called in. Jaslene was revealed to be the eighth winner of America's Next Top Model. Jaslene is the first contestant in the show's history to compete on more than one cycle and win. Jaslene is also the first Hispanic woman to win ANTM.: Special guests: CariDee English, Brent Poer, Sarah-Jane Clarke, Heidi Middleton, Carissa Rosenberg

== Summaries ==
=== Call-out order ===
Order	Episodes												
Order	1 (Note: In the first half of episode 1, the pool of 33 girls was reduced to 13. This call-out order does not reflect their performances that week.)		2	3	4	5	6	7	8	10	11	12	
1	Natasha	Jaslene	Jaslene	Brittany	Renee	Natasha	Jael	Dionne	Natasha	Jaslene	Renee	Jaslene	Jaslene
2	Kathleen	Brittany	Felicia	Jael	Natasha	Dionne	Natasha	Natasha	Renee	Natasha	Jaslene	Natasha	Natasha
3	Sarah	Felicia	Diana	Sarah	Brittany	Brittany	Dionne	Brittany	Jaslene	Renee	Natasha	Renee	
4	Cassandra	Diana	Renee	Dionne	Whitney	Jaslene	Brittany	Renee	Dionne	Dionne	Dionne		
5	Renee	Samantha	Brittany	Felicia	Jaslene	Sarah	Renee	Jaslene	Brittany	Brittany			
6	Samantha	Cassandra	Cassandra	Renee	Jael	Renee	Jaslene	Jael	Jael				
7	Dionne	Renee	Dionne	Whitney	Diana	Jael	Whitney	Whitney					
8	Whitney	Sarah	Jael	Natasha	Sarah	Whitney	Sarah						
9	Brittany	Dionne	Whitney	Jaslene	Dionne	Diana							
10	Felicia	Whitney	Sarah	Diana	Felicia								
11	Jael	Natasha	Natasha	Cassandra									
12	Jaslene	Jael	Samantha										
13	Diana	Kathleen											

The contestant was eliminated
The contestant won the competition

=== Bottom two ===
Episode	Contestants	Eliminated
1	Jael & Kathleen	Kathleen
2	Natasha & Samantha	Samantha
3	Cassandra & Diana	Cassandra
4	Dionne & Felicia	Felicia
5	Diana & Whitney	Diana
6	Sarah & Whitney	Sarah
7	Jael & Whitney	Whitney
8	Brittany & Jael	Jael
10	Brittany & Dionne	Brittany
11	Dionne & Natasha	Dionne
12	Natasha & Renee	Renee
12	Jaslene & Natasha	Natasha

The contestant was eliminated after their first time in the bottom two
The contestant was eliminated after their second time in the bottom two
The contestant was eliminated after their third time in the bottom two
The contestant was eliminated in the final judging and placed as the runner-up

=== Average call-out order ===
Casting call-out order and final two are not included.

Rank by average	Place	Model	Call-out total	Number of call-outs	Call-out average
1	5	Brittany	31	9	3.44
2	1	Jaslene	38	11	3.45
3	3	Renee	42	11	3.82
4	2	Natasha	45	11	4.09
5	4	Dionne	47	10	4.70
6	10	Felicia	20	4	5.00
7	6	Jael	48	8	6.00
8	9	Diana	33	5	6.60
9	8	Sarah	42	6	7.00
10	7	Whitney	52	7	7.43
11	11	Cassandra	23	3	7.67
12	12	Samantha	17	2	8.50
13	13	Kathleen	13	1	13.00

=== Photo shoot guide ===
- Episode 1 photo shoot was split in two halves:
  - First half: Mark Ecko's Pool Party (casting)
  - Second half: Political Controversies
- Episode 2 photo shoot: Highschool clichés
- Episode 3 photo shoot: Nude Candy-coated
- Episode 4 photo shoot: Crime Scene Victims
- Episode 5 photo shoot: Gender-swap
- Episode 6 photo shoot: Four Personalities Beautyshots
- Episode 7 photo shoot: Unforgettable ANTM moments with Past Contestants
- Episode 8 commercial: CoverGirl Queen Mascara Commercial with Australian Accent
- Episode 10 photo shoots: Swimsuits for Women's and Men's Magazines
- Episode 11 photo shoot: Aboriginal Dances
- Episode 12 photo shoots & Commercial: Covergirl beauty shot; "My Life As A Covergirl" commercial shoot for truShine lip color; Seventeen magazine covers

=== Other cast members ===
- Jay Manuel – photography
- Sutan – make-up
- Christian Marc – hair
- Anda & Masha – wardrobe

=== Makeovers ===
- Cassandra - Voluminous curly black afro weave
- Felicia - Long layered curly black weave with bangs
- Diana - Long blonde extensions
- Sarah - Cut shorter and dyed light brown
- Whitney - Long wavy black weave
- Jael - Long dark brown weave; later, weave removed and Mia Farrow inspired pixie cut
- Brittany - Long wavy red weave; later, weave removed
- Dionne - Kelis inspired cut and dyed black
- Renee - Yoanna House inspired cut
- Natasha - Vidal Sassoon inspired shoulder length cut with bangs and dyed chocolate brown
- Jaslene - Trimmed and blown-out

== Post-Top Model careers ==
- Kathleen DuJour posed for some test shots. She now works as a hair stylist in Brooklyn.
- Samantha Francis was signed with Fusion Model Management in New York City, Apple Model Management in Bangkok and Style International Management in Hong Kong. She used to be signed with Elite Model Management in New York. Her print work credits include Knit.1, Ming Pao Weekly, Macau Closer Lifestyle, Harper's Bazaar Hong Kong and Thailand, Elle Thailand, Seventeen and Elle UK. She was featured as a "Top Model in Action" during Cycle 13.
- Cassandra Watson was signed with Look Model Agency in San Francisco and SMG Models in Seattle.
- Felicia Provost used to be signed with Elite Model Management in Chicago. She was in Time Out Chicago and Brune magazine. She is now a dance teacher in Hong Kong.
- Diana Zalewski continued her education, and posed for some test shots. She signed with Slam Piece Model Management in Phoenix and modeled for Pound Cake Couture, Mama Piggy, and Skorch magazine in 2007. She became an ambassador for Cool Whip, Oscar Meyer, and Hostess LLC.
- Sarah VonderHaar was signed with Elite Model Management in Chicago. She became a recording artist and had a debut album in 2008 called "Are You Listening Now" with music videos for "I Got Sunshine" and "All Mine".
- Whitney Cunningham had posed for some test shots and was in Plus magazine and IMT Styles magazine. She used to be signed with CESD Modeling Agency. She is now the president of a marketing company.
- Jael Strauss used to be signed with Otto Models and also had her own clothing line with Hitch Couture. As of 2012, Strauss was reported to be battling methamphetamine addiction. Appearing on the Dr. Phil show on September 13, 2012, she discussed her struggle with addiction. She made a full recovery and modeled for HeartWater and The Legging Project in 2017. In 2018, she was diagnosed with stage 4 breast cancer and died at age 34 on December 4, 2018.
- Brittany Hatch was signed with Beatrice International Models in Milan and with New York Model Management. She was in magazines such as South, DS and Twill. She was a model for tests shots by Sarah VonderHaar.
- Dionne Walters was signed with Eye Candy Model Management. She was in magazines such as Kontrol, Upgrade and Ellements.
- Renee Alway was signed with NEXT Model Management and appeared on Modelville. On December 10, 2014, DeWitt was sentenced to 12 years in prison after pleading guilty to four felony burglary counts, one count of vehicle theft, one count of firearm possession and one misdemeanor count of identity theft. She was dismissed of more than a dozen other counts under a plea agreement.
- Natasha Galkina is currently signed with Red Model Management in New York City, under the name "Alie M", NEXT Management in Milan and Elite Model Management in New York. She used to be signed with MUSE Modeling Agency in New York, IMG Models in New York, MGMT First in New York City, Ace Model Management in Athens, Beatrice International Models in Milan, Wilhelmina Models in Los Angeles and Ford Models in New York. She also appeared in editorials for Italian Vogue as well as A Cover Of Beauty In Vogue In Russia, Teen Vogue, I-D Magazine, Elle Magazine, Seventeen Magazine, Harper's Bazaar in Hong Kong, Fashion Magazine, Vanity Fair, Marie Claire and Maxim Magazine. She also signed with Fenton Moon New York, along with other alumni Andrea Debevc and Mikaela Schipani from Cycles 6 (semifinalist) and 16, respectively.
- Jaslene Gonzalez is currently signed with MC2 Models in New York, Faces Model Management in Malaysia and Exodus Model Management. She has modeled for the New York Post (Tempo), Us Weekly, In Touch Weekly, had a 6-page spread in an issue of Vibe Vixen magazine, a 12-page fashion spread for ZooZoom Magazine. Named One Of Latina Magazine's Latinas Of the Year, had a 9-page spread for Colures (U.K. fashion Magazine), was featured in Trace: Model Behaviour as Falls new faces, has been on the covers and had spreads of over a dozen magazines such as Latina, Imagen, Hombre, 6 Degrees, FN, ZooZoom, Fashion Salon Seventeen, Urban Latino, Bleu, Vanidades, Scene, JamRock, Splendor, Time Out. and Metrostyle Catalog. She has also appeared in Lot29 Fall/Winter 07-08 and Spring/Summer 08 ad campaigns; she has had a total of four billboards in Times Square so far. Also, she shares one of her Lot29 billboards in Times Square, New York with Katarzyna Dolinska. Gonzalez shot an ad campaign for online retailer ShopBop, 8-page fashion spreads for both Scene Magazine and JamRock Magazine. She is also featured on the pages of Living Proof Magazine, American Salon Magazine and currently has an ad campaign with Marianne Stores. Gonzalez has had an Ad Campaign for designer Cesar Galindo 's Spring 2008 Collection and appeared on the pages of Supermodels Unlimited Magazine twice for the August and September/October 2008 issues. Gonzalez is also part of the "Heart On My Sleeve" clothing campaign by Aubrey O'Day. Gonzalez is on the pages of YRB Magazine. She has also been featured on COACD, fashionista.com and in Women's Wear Daily. Gonzalez currently has nationwide campaigns with Garnier Nutrisse, and Southpole. In addition, Kett Cosmetics, Marianne Stores F/W 09, and Recession Denim F/W 09 campaigns. She has also been on the cover Nuovo Magazine. She has been on the cover of Nylon Mexico. In India, she has been in Marie Claire (June 2012), New Woman and Grazia. She was in the Celestino Couture 2017 Lookbook.

== Death of Jael Strauss ==
On December 4, 2018, Strauss died at age 34 due to stage 4 inflammatory breast cancer.
