= Cassandra Jean =

American actress and model

- Born: Cassandra Jean Whitehead; Houston, Texas, U.S.
- Education: Texas A&M University–Corpus Christi
- Occupations: Actress; model; beauty pageant queen
- Spouse: Stephen Amell (m. 2012)
- Children: 2

Cassandra Jean Whitehead, also known as Cassandra Jean W. Amell, is an American actress, model and beauty pageant titleholder. Jean attended Texas A&M University–Corpus Christi.

== Beauty pageants ==
Jean competed in the Miss Texas Teen USA pageant from 2002 to 2004. She held the local title of Miss Houston Teen USA in 2003. In these pageants, she competed alongside future Miss Texas USA Lauren Lanning (2006) and Magen Ellis (2007). Jean (as Cassandra Whitehead) won Miss Corpus Christi 2004, a title held by Eva Longoria in 1998. She made the top 10 at Miss Texas USA 2005.

Whitehead competed in the Miss California USA 2008 pageant but was disqualified due to her appearance on America's Next Top Model. In June 2009, the Miss Universe Organization changed the rule barring former reality show contestants from competing in state pageants. This rule change would benefit Cycle 12 finalist Natalie Pack, who later won Miss California USA 2012, and The Voice contestant DeAnna Johnson, who won the title of Miss Georgia USA 2017.

In 2008, Whitehead was a judge for the Miss Newport Beach pageant. Whitehead was a 19-year-old student at Texas A&M University–Corpus Christi while participating in America's Next Top Model.

== America's Next Top Model ==
Jean was the first girl chosen for the top thirteen to compete on the UPN reality television show America's Next Top Model, Cycle 5; however, she quit the competition outside of judging panel during the fourth episode. She became very emotional during the makeovers in episode three, wherein her long, dark brown hair was cut extremely short and bleached blonde. During the next judging round, host Tyra Banks was still not pleased with Jean's haircut, wanting to make it even shorter and scheduling a time to have it redone but, Jean refused. Claiming that the producers gave her one night to consider her options, she walked out the following morning. During her time on Top Model, Jean took two photos and received one third call-out and one first call-out. Jean's choice to quit and Sarah Rhoades's elimination during the same week later forced a non-elimination episode where together both Jayla Rubinelli and Nicole Linkletter (who eventually won over Nik Pace) survived their first-ever bottom two appearances each. Jean made an appearance in The Cycle 5 Reunion, America's Next Top Model: Where the Girls Are, and America's Next Top Model: Exposed. In 2009, she was voted one of the most memorable contestants by AOL Canada entertainment.

== Acting career ==
Jean appears in the film 2 Dudes and a Dream (2009). She has had guest roles on several TV shows including One Tree Hill, The Middleman, CSI: Miami, CSI: Crime Scene Investigation, Las Vegas, Hannah Montana, Twenty-Four Seven (MTV), America's Next Producer (TV Guide Network), and a speaking role on Mad Men.

Jean hosted Lucky Strike's Bowl for a Cause, MySpace and Tommy Lee's Super Bowl XL Event, Miss Corpus Christi 2006, America's Next Top Model Diva Dish along with "Red Carpet Makeovers" for the Tyra Banks Show. She also appeared on the game show 1 vs. 100 on February 15, 2008, winning $500,000.

Jean played the character of Nora Fries in Elseworlds, the 2018 Arrowverse crossover event between The CW series The Flash, Arrow, and Supergirl.

== Filmography ==
=== Film ===
Year	Title	Role	Notes
2009	2 Dudes and a Dream	Hot girl	Direct-to-video
2010	Kill Katie Malone	Ellen	
2012	Yellow	Becky	
2013	Love and Skin	Stephanie	Short film
2017	Rice on White	Izabella	

=== Television ===
Year	Title	Role	Notes
2005	America's Next Top Model	Herself	Contestant (4 episodes)
2007	CSI: Miami	Murder victim	Uncredited role (Episode: "Born to Kill")
2007	Hannah Montana	Pretty girl	Uncredited role (Episode: "Sleepwalk This Way")
2007	Las Vegas	Bikini contestant	Uncredited role (Episode: "Head Games")
2007	CSI: Crime Scene Investigation	Pola Chesterwood	Episode: "The Chick Chop Flick Shop"
2008	The Middleman	Dana Barrett	Episode: "The Ectoplasmic Panhellenic Investigation"
2009	One Tree Hill	Missy	2 episodes
2010	Passenger	Cherub Zoon / Sarah	1 episode
2010	Mad Men	Carolyn Jones	Episode: "Tomorrowland"
2010	NCIS: Los Angeles	Receptionist	Episode: "Anonymous"
2011	CSI: NY	Olivia Prescott	Episode: "Do or Die"
2013	Hart of Dixie	Claudette	Episode: "The Gambler"
2018	Arrow	Nora Fries	Episode: "Elseworlds, Part 2"
2018	Supergirl	Nora Fries	Episode: "Elseworlds, Part 3"
2020-2021	Roswell, New Mexico	Louise Truman	8 episodes

== Personal life ==
Jean married actor Stephen Amell on December 25, 2012, while they were on a vacation in the Caribbean. They have a daughter Mavi, born in 2013, and a son, Bowen Auguste Amell, born on May 13, 2022.
