= America's Next Top Model season 10 =

America's Next Top Model
- Season 10
- Cycle 10 cast
- Judges: Tyra Banks; Nigel Barker; J. Alexander; Paulina Porizkova
- No. of contestants: 14
- Winner: Whitney Thompson
- No. of episodes: 13

Release
- Original network: The CW
- Original release: February 20 – May 14, 2008

Additional information
- Filming dates: November 2 – December 20, 2007

Season chronology
- ← Previous; Season 9 Next → Season 11

The tenth season of America's Next Top Model was the fourth of the series to air on The CW network. The promotional catchphrase of the cycle is "New Faces, New Attitude, New York". The promotional song was "Feedback" by Janet Jackson.

A few major changes were made this season. The show was moved back to New York, after being housed in Los Angeles since cycle 4. The number of contestants was also increased to 14, after being maintained at 13 since cycle 5. Finally, the judging panel, unchanged since cycle 5, was also altered; Twiggy was replaced by model Paulina Porizkova due to the former's scheduling conflicts.

The prizes for this cycle were:

- A modeling contract with Elite Model Management
- A fashion spread and cover in Seventeen
- A US$100,000 contract with CoverGirl cosmetics

The international destination for this cycle was Rome, Italy, the franchises' second of three visits to Italy throughout the current seasons.

The winner of the competition was 20-year-old Whitney Thompson from Atlantic Beach, Florida. Thompson was the first plus-size model to win the competition. This season averaged 4.23 million viewers per episode.

== Contestants ==
(Ages stated are at start of contest)

Contestant	Age	Height	Hometown	Finish	Place
Kimberly Rydzewski †	20	5 ft 10 in (1.78 m)	Worcester, Massachusetts	Episode 2	14 (quit)
Atalya Slater	18	5 ft 9.5 in (1.77 m)	East Flatbush, New York	Episode 2	13
Allison Kuehn	18	5 ft 11 in (1.80 m)	Waunakee, Wisconsin	Episode 3	12
Amis Jenkins	20	5 ft 11 (1.80 m)	Bartlesville, Oklahoma	Episode 4	11
Marvita Washington	23	6 ft 0 in (1.83 m)	Anchorage, Alaska	Episode 5	10
Aimee Wright	18	5 ft 10 in (1.78 m)	Spanaway, Washington	Episode 6	9
Claire Unabia	24	5 ft 9 in (1.75 m)	Crown Heights, New York	Episode 7	8
Stacy-Ann Fequiere	22	5 ft 11 (1.80 m)	Miami, Florida	Episode 9	7
Lauren Utter	22	6 ft 0 in (1.83 m)	Bedford-Stuyvesant, New York	Episode 10	6
Katarzyna Dolinska	22	5 ft 10 in (1.78 m)	Roslyn, New York	Episode 11	5
Dominique Reighard	23	5 ft 11 in (1.80 m)	Columbus, Ohio	Episode 12	4
Fatima Siad	22	5 ft 11 (1.80 m)	Boston, Massachusetts	Episode 13	3
Anya Kop	18	5 ft 10 in (1.78 m)	Honolulu, Hawaii	Episode 13	2
Whitney Thompson	20	5 ft 10 in (1.78 m)	Atlantic Beach, Florida	Episode 13	1

== Episodes ==
No. overall	No. in season	Title	Original release date	US viewers (millions)
110	1	"Welcome to the Top Model Prep"	February 20, 2008	3.81
35 contestants arrived in Los Angeles at "Top Model Prep" where they met "the two Jays", Jay Manuel and J. Alexander. They shot a class photo before commencing runway lessons with Miss J., where Lauren was seen as the weakest walker. Next, the contestants attended a bonfire where the "Homecoming Queen" was going to be announced. The cheerleaders by the stage were revealed to be contestants from previous cycles: Furonda and Joanie (cycle 6), twins Amanda and Michelle (cycle 7) and Jael (cycle 8). Mr. Jay then announced that the contestants would be taken to New York City. The homecoming queen turned out to be Tyra, who surprised the contestants by coming out from behind the curtains. Casting interviews then commenced. Notable contestants included Shaya Ali, Shalynda McKenzie, Marguerite Swallow and Kristen Hubbard. The contestants were pared down to the top 20 contestants, where they participated in a senior class photoshoot in which they had to do their own hair and makeup. Later in the day, Tyra revealed the top thirteen contestants. When she called "Aimee/Amy," both advanced, and Amy offered to change her name to avoid confusion. Initially, Anya had been called out as the last contestant to join the thirteen contestants, however, Tyra mentioned that the remaining seven contestants not selected to be in the top thirteen had very strong potential. After revealing that "thirteen is an unlucky number" an extra slot had been opened in the competition in order to allow Dominique to join the cast as the fourteenth contestant.: Special guests: Furonda Brasfield, Joanie Dodds, Michelle Babin, Amanda Babin, Jael Strauss
111	2	"New York City, Here we Come"	February 27, 2008	3.82
The contestants were taken to their loft in New York City, which featured a humanitarian theme. Amy decided to change her name to "Amis." To Amis, Fatima and Kim's frustration, there was a "no smoking" sign which led them to smoke outside of the loft which Atalya was shocked to know about. Mr. and Miss J. arrived and rounded up the contestants for a city tour. The final stop was a Badgley Mischka runway show. After the show, Fatima unintentionally hit Marvita in the face with her hand, brewing tension. The contestants were then taken to the Elite Model Management building, where they met Paulina Porizkova and Neal Hamil; Paulina gave each contestant brutal and harsh criticism on their appearance. At the photo shoot, the contestants had to portray homeless women being surrounded by high fashion models, one of the models was future Cycle 11 contestant Isis King. Most of the contestants received positive feedback, but Allison's Pilates, Amis' over-enthusiasm and Kim's dead expressions were criticized. Later, Kim admitted to Fatima that high fashion was not her interest. At panel, Kim was called for evaluation, she stated her lack of desire for the fashion industry, and proceeded to quit the competition as was the third contestant to voluntarily leave the show (see her reason to quit below). Tyra announced that there would still be an elimination. Atalya and Amis were in the bottom two, Atalya for lacking a high fashion appeal, and Amis for looking lost in her photo. However, the judges felt Amis had more potential, and Atalya was the first contestant eliminated.: Featured photographer: Sarah McColgan; Special guests: Mark Badgley, James Mischka, Neal Hamil, Taz Tagore, Isis King; CoverGirl of the Week: Claire Unabia
112	3	"Top Model Makeovers"	March 5, 2008	3.52
The contestants received Apple Bottoms apparel that came in white purses. Allison was offended when Fatima told her that she had a larger body than hers, and Allison revealed her past struggles with anorexia. The contestants were taken to Walmart for a CoverGirl makeup challenge, which Claire won. Back at the house, Allison used dolls to represent the earlier incident between herself and Fatima. Playing with an African-American doll, Allison re-enacted the incident offensively with somewhat racist remarks. Fatima took this badly and fired back that it wasn't her problem that Allison had an eating disorder and "needed to grow up and really take responsibility for her own anorexic issues". Later, the contestants received their makeovers. To mimic a true agency, Tyra didn't tell the contestants their makeovers. Fatima's new weave came with a lot of pain and tears, but she ended up loving it. There was general satisfaction among the other contestants as well, even for Stacy-Ann, who wished for Naomi Campbell's long hair but ended up with short hair that she said "Brought out her features, so she had no choice but to bring it", but it was at first unclear whether or not Allison liked her hair, though later she appeared to and claimed she did in interviews. This was the first makeover episode without breakdowns over haircuts or hairstyles. Even Stacy-Ann, who received one of the more drastic makeovers, was still satisfied. The photoshoot took place on a yacht with the Brooklyn Bridge in the background. They met Elle Macpherson and modeled her line of lingerie. At judging, Lauren's awkwardness translated into high fashion in her photo, and Marvita and Aimee also excelled. Amis managed to have a better shot than last week while Katarzyna was criticized for looking too sexy. Tyra was disappointed when she found out that the stylist covered up Whitney's sexy full-figured body. Dominique and Allison landed in the bottom two; Dominique for thinking that she was "perfect" despite a lackluster photo, and Allison for "coming into the competition so cocky because she had more experience than the other girls" and not saying "thank you" when Tyra told her she looked "so soft and pretty". An emotional Allison was the second girl eliminated and was shocked by the other contestants.: Featured photographer: George Holz; Special guests: Elle Macpherson, Stephen Knoll, Brent Poer, Molly Stern; CoverGirl of the Week: Claire Unabia
113	4	"Where's The Beef?"	March 12, 2008	3.65
The contestants were taken to the New York City Fire Department, where they met Miss J. for a runway teach. They had 90 seconds to change into proper outfits, but Fatima failed to change shoes. The mock runway was performed in front of the firefighters. The contestants were then taken to a runway show where they had to walk for fashion label "Tuleh." They met cycle 8 winner Jaslene Gonzalez, who critiqued them after the show. Fatima and Whitney's wardrobe malfunctions didn't go unnoticed and Lauren's speedy walk was heavily criticized. Katarzyna won the challenge, and picked Amis and Marvita to join in her prize – a Lot 29 photoshoot in Seventeen magazine with Jaslene. For the week's photoshoot, the contestants were taken to the Meat Packing District, posing with and wearing meat. Aimee, Amis, and Fatima all struggled in the strange environment. Twenty minutes before panel, Amis was still sleeping, and she only had time to put on a headband and hooded jacket. Unsurprisingly, she was criticized for not dressing like a model. At panel, Anya's high fashion photo and Whitney's quirky and creative shot received universal praise, but Lauren's shot was once again deemed the best by the judges. However, she wasn't called first because of her poor walk. Claire performed well once again, and Katarzyna and Dominique's photos showed signs of improvement. Aimee and Marvita, however, performed worse this week than the week prior. The bottom two were Amis, for her lack of focus, and Fatima, for her inability to model head to toe. Amis was eliminated because the judges thought she lacked passion and aimed less.: Featured photographer: Trevor O'Shana; Special guests: New York City Fire Department, Bryan Bradley, Andrew Weir, Jaslene Gonzalez, Ann Shoket, Janice Welles; CoverGirl of the Week: Claire Unabia
114	5	"Top Model Takes it On the Streets"	March 19, 2008	3.79
The contestants met posing instructor Benny Ninja, who teamed up with model Vendela Kirsebom to teach the contestants different poses for catalog, commercial and couture shots in an abandoned warehouse. Back at the house, Whitney created a phone list, which was a schedule that assigned each contestant a limited amount of time to call home. When Dominique missed her phone time, she caused a row with Whitney, escalating to the point where Dominique accused Whitney of being a racist, which the latter angrily denied. For their challenge, Benny and Vendela tested their knowledge of the three types of poses by pitting them against each other in a posing challenge, splitting into two groups of five, Team A and Team B. Team B won the challenge after Katarzyna was chosen as she and her team ultimately won a trip to a swag tent. Claire was deemed the best overall and won an additional prize – a trip to Bora Bora. The week's photoshoot required the contestants to do an extreme beauty shot with paint as their main makeup. Most contestants delivered once again but Marvita struggled with her shot. At panel, most of the contestants were praised for strong shots, especially Stacy-Ann's and Dominique's, but Marvita and Whitney's pictures were deemed unsatisfactory. The judges thought Fatima's picture was beautiful but she was heavily criticized for not shaving her armpits, which showed in her picture. In the end, for the first time ever Whitney and Marvita landed in the bottom two, both for their bad photos and questionable passion for the competition. The judges felt that Whitney had more desire and Marvita was eliminated despite auditioning again for Top Model.: Featured photographer: Peter Buckingham; Special guests: Benny Ninja, Vendela Kirsebom, Karen Wood; CoverGirl of the Week: Katarzyna Dolinska
115	6	"House of Pain"	March 26, 2008	3.53
This episode started with Dominique's alarm clock going off sporadically throughout the night, irritating her roommates especially Claire. Tension mounted when Lauren, Claire and Whitney accused Dominique of being a negative person and ganged up on her bringing her to tears. But her mom convinced her that she was better than them, and Dominique believed her and tried to ignore them. Tyra taught the girls how to pose at the end of the runway and how to pose while looking pained. She then declared a pose-off, in which Anya impressed Tyra the most. The teach was actually a secret challenge, and Anya won a chance to shoot timeless nude photographs taken by Nigel Barker. The photoshoot this week was taken place at McCarren Pool for embodying different genres of music. Whitney was commended for her photo, while Fatima was once given approval for her range of poses. Katarzyna produced her best photograph to date while sporting a wig, which inspired Tyra to give her a haircut. Stacy-Ann, on the other hand, was criticized for her photo. In the end, it was Aimee and Claire who landed in the bottom two, both for the first time ever. Despite both the girls having two of the easiest genres, each one produced a bad photo, with Aimee's being deemed lackluster and Claire's too harsh for a country theme. In the end, Claire was spared, and Aimee was sent home, despite having delivered previous great photographs.: Featured photographer: Russell James; CoverGirl of the Week: Anya Kop
116	7	"If You Can't Make it Here, You Can't Make it Anywhere"	April 2, 2008	3.87
Tension brewed when Fatima accused Lauren of dumping away her unfinished coffee. While Fatima remained calm, Lauren started swearing at Fatima. The girls arrived at the Elite building for their go-sees challenge, in which they were split into two groups of four. The models walked for three designers, where they all received rather positive reviews; however, the designers criticized Lauren's walk. There was concern that Whitney and Dominique's dislike of each other would impede their team's progress, but their team nevertheless won the challenge, with Stacy Ann receiving the most bookings on the winning team. The entire team won a shoot for the June issue of Seventeen magazine. At the photoshoot, the contestants had to pose over a mylar sheet in water from the off-Broadway show Fuerza Bruta. Claire hurt her neck after falling straight down on the sheet (which she had been specifically told not to do), causing her to struggle with her shoot. Half of the girls shone, while the other half struggled. Whitney impressed Jay highly, probably because she wasn't afraid to show another side of herself. While Anya constantly made very good poses, Fatima also impressed Jay, however, she moved too slow so most of her film would appear the same. Katarzyna received her shorter haircut, and was at first a little upset at the quick way her long hair was cut off and the drastic change, but was initially happy at the mid-neck length result. She also impressed Jay even though she was a little bit slow at first. Both Dominique and Stacy Ann failed to fully impress Jay, both of them did mediocrely but turned out to produce decent photos. However, Lauren failed to bring her awkwardness to the camera and didn't impress Jay, and Claire's work didn't turn out very well after she hurt her neck. At panel, Fatima, Anya, Katarzyna, and Whitney received universal praise, Katarzyna's haircut getting highly complimented from all the judges. Stacy Ann was congratulated for her challenge win, but her film was criticized. Lauren's awkward personality, a weak presence in the judging room, and mediocre photo landed her in the bottom two together with Claire, who was criticized for her lack of versatility and her "one-note look." Despite a stellar portfolio, Claire was sent packing.: Featured photographer: Mike Rosenthal; Special guests: Karen Lee, Kristy Hinze, Shoshanna Gruss, Pamella De Vos, Stacey Bendet, Ann Shoket; CoverGirl of the Week: Katarzyna Dolinska
117	8	"Top Model 10 Confidential"	April 9, 2008	2.38
This was the cycle's recap episode. It reviewed the first seven episodes and showed some never-before-seen footage, including Stacy-Ann singing to the judges during casting, Claire's breastmilk-pumping antics, Marvita parading around the house naked as well as annoying the other contestants by playing badly on a guitar, the New York firefighters' mock runway show, Anya photographing the other contestants, a playful wrestling fight between some contestants and a fun night out at "Libation," a New York pub, where Stacy-Ann took a bottle of "complimentary" vodka back home.
118	9	"For Those About to Walk, We Salute You"	April 16, 2008	3.85
The contestants learned about interview skills from Paulina Porizkova. Later, Lauren cut the tip of her thumb while chopping onions and needed stitches. This week's challenge required the contestants to work a "green" carpet at a 7 Up party and handle themselves well at the party. Anya was praised for her ability to connect with others, and won another nude photoshoot for 7 Up and US$10,000 as payment. Back at the house, Stacy-Ann confessed that she was jealous of Anya for winning the challenge. The girls assumed they were going to travel abroad due to a hint in Tyra Mail, so the contestants packed their belongings. They were taken to the airport but Jay told them that they would actually be doing a photoshoot portraying a group of jet-setters boarding an airplane, using suitcases as props. Fatima ran into trouble with her travel documentation (since she was a refugee and not a United States citizen, but a permanent citizen holding a Green Card) and missed the photoshoot due to an appointment the show's producers had made to fix the issue at an unidentified consulate. After the shoot, the contestants were told that judging would take place immediately at the tarmac airplane hangar. It was also revealed that after judging, the top six contestants would be jet-setting to their abroad location, though Tyra did not reveal where this was. Anya once again gave phenomenal poses, and really stood out in the group thus receiving her third first call-out. Lauren was highly praised for keeping her face in a right expression, while Katarzyna was praised for looking different from the other contestants. Whitney was criticized for being too "pageant," though Mr. Jay gave her credit for working hard on set. Stacy-Ann was lambasted for not knowing her angles. In the end, Fatima landed in the bottom two with Stacy-Ann. Fatima was severely reprimanded for missing the photoshoot and not having her travel documents, and Stacy-Ann for her overall potential. Fatima was ultimately saved for the second time by her better and improving portfolio. (Note: Fatima thus became the second contestant in the show's history to miss a photo shoot yet not get eliminated, the other being Shannon Stewart from cycle 1.) Stacy-Ann was eliminated and Tyra announced that the remaining six contestants would go to Rome, Italy for the rest of the competition.: Featured photographer: Bill Heuberger; Special guests: Jay Godfrey, Courtney Kish, Lara Spencer, Ric Ocasek, April Wilkner, Jaslene Gonzalez, Ann Shoket, Hillary Wolf; CoverGirl of the Week: Lauren Utter
119	10	"Viva Italia!"	April 23, 2008	4.35
The contestants arrived in Rome, where they toured the city before going to their new home. Not long after, Fatima came down with a fever; Anya helped her by bringing her dinner while Dominique gossiped about her. Claudio Brassini gave the contestants a fashion tour on Segways. Afterward, they went to their challenge, where Gai Mattiolo judged their walks and how they looked in his clothing. Anya won the challenge, and her prize was a long white red carpet dress, designed by Gai Mattiolo. The contestants filmed a CoverGirl commercial in Italian. Fatima, Katarzyna, and Whitney were the only ones able to get their lines out fully. Jay called out Whitney for acting too fake, and Katarzyna for being too flat, while he named Fatima the best of the day. Anya's lines were unintelligible, Dominique overacted and didn't get many words right although she did put in the effort and tried, and Lauren looked like she didn't even try. At judging, the only contestants that were able to impress all the judges were Katarzyna and Fatima because they delivered the dialogue really well, however Tyra was afraid that they looked too flat and not selling the CoverGirl, Anya and Dominique failed to deliver the dialogue well, and Whitney was deemed too fake. However, most criticisms came to Lauren, who seemed like she really didn't even try at all. For the second time each, Whitney and Lauren were revealed as the bottom two. Whitney received the last photo and Lauren was eliminated despite taking strong photos.: Featured commercial director: Piersandro Buzzanca; Special guests: Gai Mattiolo, Claudio Brassini, Attilio Vaccari, Brent Poer; CoverGirl of the Week: Anya Kop
120	11	"We Are Spartans!"	April 30, 2008	4.19
The contestants were brought to a gladiator fighting school, where fighting instructor Alex Mariotti taught them the basics of gladiator fighting. After donning gladiator costumes, Mr. Jay and Miss J. explained that the teacher was supposed to help them bring out more versatility and power in their photos, before revealing the photo challenge, which was using the moves that they had just learned, while still keeping grace and composure. Whitney won the challenge and was given a €1,000 shopping spree; she chose Anya to accompany her. The contestants were taken to a Roman castle for their photoshoot, where they were dressed in modern Renaissance fashion. Fatima and Dominique received universal praise during the photoshoot. At panel, Dominique was heralded for producing a gorgeous shot, but was criticized for dressing too "game-showish." Anya's photograph received universal praise, though the judges voiced concern over her generic personality. Katarzyna was criticized for having dead eyes in her photograph and for her seemingly flat personality, while Whitney was criticized for her "cramped" poses. At panel, Fatima, Dominique and Anya were all safe in first, second and third places, respectively, while Katarzyna and Whitney landed in the bottom two. Whitney (for the third time) for her inability to live up to her full modeling potential, and Katarzyna who was ultimately eliminated in her first-ever bottom two appearance because the judges felt that she was just "coasting along" rather than really making an impression.: Featured photographer: Tyra Banks; Special guests: Alex Mariotti, Marianna Bertagnolli; CoverGirl of the Week: Katarzyna Dolinska
121	12	"Ready For My Close-Up"	May 7, 2008	4.02
To help them better understand their role in front of the camera, the contestants received a photography lesson. This was followed by a challenge in which they directed and shot Paulina Porizkova, as Seventeen editor Ann Shoket looked on. Dominique's lack of focus and Anya's over-enthusiasm were critiqued, while Fatima and Whitney's professionalism were praised. Fatima was chosen as the winner, with a reward of 50 extra frames at the upcoming photoshoot. At the photoshoot, with Nigel Barker as the photographer, the contestants portrayed Italian movie stars being pursued by the paparazzi. Mr. Jay and Nigel experienced difficulty getting the contestants into character, leaving all feeling vulnerable. At the panel, no one produced the super-super good photo except for Anya who Nigel pointed out that it was highly accidental. Dominique was criticized for looking like a drag queen and Fatima for not taking direction from Mr. J and Nigel on the shoot. Both Dominique and Fatima landed in the bottom two. Deemed as having more potential, Fatima was saved for the third time and Dominique was eliminated.: Featured photographer: Nigel Barker; Special guests: Francesco Licata, Ann Shoket; CoverGirl of the Week: Whitney Thompson
122	13	"And... the Winner is!"	May 14, 2008	4.75
The top three contestants were put to the test when they had to shoot a commercial and a photoshoot for CoverGirl LashBlast Mascara. It was revealed that the winner of the cycle would have her ad on a billboard in Times Square. During the commercial, all of the contestants struggled with their lines, but still managed to look like real CoverGirls. During judging, the judges commented that Whitney's commercial was average, but deemed her photo stellar. Anya's commercial was described as a "train wreck," but that was overlooked by her personality on film and her stellar look in the commercial. However, her beauty shot, as portrayed by Paulina, came off as her looking "stupid." They were not impressed by Fatima's performance in her commercial. Anya was called first for the fifth and last time for her personality in the commercial leaving Fatima and Whitney in the bottom two, both for the fourth time. Tyra was still not clear who Whitney actually was, and whether she was not as beautiful as she seemed to be and act. They also criticized Fatima for still not listening. Ultimately, Whitney moved on and Fatima was eliminated.: Featured photographer: Jim De Yonker; Whitney and Anya competed in an Italian fashion runway show, with Cycle 9 winner Saleisha Stowers joined them for the show. Whitney and Anya competed against each other in Versace gowns, with their outfits handpicked by the designer herself, Donatella Versace. During the final deliberation, Whitney was told she did a very good job, but she forgot to pose long enough at the end of the runway. Anya was told she didn't walk as strong as Whitney, but she still looked stunning and improved a lot since the beginning of the competition. The judges then examined both Whitney and Anya's body of work. The judges felt that Anya's photos were edgy, high fashion, and made the clothes appear worth buying while Whitney's were warm, approachable, and attractive to men. Tyra announced Whitney as the tenth winner of America's Next Top Model.: Featured photographer: Nigel Barker; Featured commercial director: Brent Poer; Special guests: Saleisha Stowers, Ann Shoket

== Summaries ==
=== Call-out order ===
Order	Episodes												
Order	1 (Note: In episode 1, the pool of 35 girls was reduced to 13. This call-out order does not reflect their performances that week. Aimee and Amy were called simultaneously when Tyra vaguely said their name. Amy later changed her name to "Amis" to avoid confusion with Aimee. The judging panel originally intended to have thirteen contestants in the final cast, but after the final thirteen were revealed, Tyra announced that the fourteenth contestant–Dominique–would also be part of the cast.)	2 (Note: In episode 2, Kimberly quit the competition when she was called forward for her individual evaluation at judging panel.)	3	4	5	6	7	9 (Note: In episode 9, Fatima did not participate in the photoshoot.)	10	11	12	13	
1	Allison	Anya	Lauren	Anya	Stacy-Ann	Whitney	Fatima	Anya	Fatima	Fatima	Anya	Anya	Whitney
2	Fatima	Claire	Marvita	Whitney	Dominique	Katarzyna	Anya	Lauren	Katarzyna	Dominique	Whitney	Whitney	Anya
3	Katarzyna	Whitney	Aimee	Katarzyna	Claire	Fatima	Katarzyna	Dominique	Anya	Anya	Fatima	Fatima	
4	Kimberly	Lauren	Claire	Claire	Anya	Lauren	Whitney	Katarzyna	Dominique	Whitney	Dominique		
5	Stacy-Ann	Aimee	Stacy-Ann	Dominique	Lauren	Anya	Stacy-Ann	Whitney	Whitney	Katarzyna			
6	Aimee; Amis	Fatima	Fatima	Stacy-Ann	Aimee	Dominique	Dominique	Fatima	Lauren				
7	Aimee; Amis	Marvita	Anya	Lauren	Katarzyna	Stacy-Ann	Lauren	Stacy-Ann					
8	Claire	Katarzyna	Whitney	Marvita	Fatima	Claire	Claire						
9	Whitney	Stacy-Ann	Katarzyna	Aimee	Whitney	Aimee							
10	Marvita	Dominique	Amis	Fatima	Marvita								
11	Lauren	Allison	Dominique	Amis									
12	Atalya	Amis	Allison										
13	Anya	Atalya											
14	Dominique	Kimberly											

The contestant was eliminated
The contestant quit the competition
The contestant won the competition

=== Bottom two ===
Episode	Contestants	Eliminated
2	Amis & Atalya	Kimberly
2	Amis & Atalya	Atalya
3	Allison & Dominique	Allison
4	Amis & Fatima	Amis
5	Marvita & Whitney	Marvita
6	Aimee & Claire	Aimee
7	Claire & Lauren	Claire
9	Fatima & Stacy-Ann	Stacy-Ann
10	Lauren & Whitney	Lauren
11	Katarzyna & Whitney	Katarzyna
12	Dominique & Fatima	Dominique
13	Fatima & Whitney	Fatima
13	Anya & Whitney	Anya

The contestant was eliminated after their first time in the bottom two
The contestant was eliminated after their second time in the bottom two
The contestant was eliminated after their fourth time in the bottom two
The contestant quit the competition
The contestant was eliminated in the final judging and placed as the runner-up

=== Average call-out order ===
Casting call-out order and final two are not included.

Rank by average	Place	Model	Call-out total	Number of call-outs	Call-out average
1	2	Anya	29	11	2.64
2	1	Whitney	45	11	4.09
3	3	Fatima	48	11	4.36
4	6	Lauren	36	8	4.50
5	5	Katarzyna	43	9	4.78
6	8	Claire	29	6	4.83
7	4	Dominique	53	10	5.30
8	7	Stacy-Ann	40	7	5.71
9	9	Aimee	32	5	6.40
10	10	Marvita	27	4	6.75
11	11	Amis	33	3	11.00
12	12	Allison	23	2	11.50
13	13	Atalya	13	1	13.00
14	14	Kimberly	—N/a	—N/a	—N/a

=== Photo shoot guide ===
- Episode 1 photo shoots: School ID (casting)
- Episode 2 photo shoot: Homeless models
- Episode 3 photo shoot: "Intimates" lingeries by Elle Macpherson on a yacht by the Brooklyn Bridge
- Episode 4 photo shoot: Meat packing factory
- Episode 5 photo shoot: Extreme beauty shots with paint
- Episode 6 photo shoot: Music genres
- Episode 7 photo shoot: Fuerza Bruta on mylar
- Episode 9 photo shoot: Vintage jet setters boarding an airplane
- Episode 10 Commercial: CoverGirl queen collection vibrant hue lipcolor commercial in Italian
- Episode 11 photo shoot: Roman castle renaissance haute couture
- Episode 12 photo shoot: Paparazzi divas
- Episode 13 Commercial and photo shoot: CoverGirl lashblast mascara commercial and print ad; Seventeen magazine covers

=== Other cast members ===
- Jay Manuel
- Sutan Amrull
- Christian Marc
- Anda & Masha

=== Makeovers ===
- Allison – Volumized and dyed copper
- Amis – Long golden blonde extensions with bangs
- Marvita – Horse mane weave
- Aimee – Cut to shoulder-length with bangs and dyed red
- Claire – Buzz cut and dyed platinum blonde
- Stacy Ann – Cut short
- Lauren – Long strawberry blonde extensions
- Katarzyna – Trimmed and dyed chocolate brown; later, bob cut
- Dominique – Bob cut and dyed dark brown; later, re-dyed dark blonde
- Fatima – Long chestnut brown weave
- Anya – Cut to shoulder-length and dyed platinum blonde with bleached eyebrows
- Whitney – Long blonde extensions

== Post-Top Model careers ==
- Kimberly Rydzewski modeled for Twenty Three Vintage, Calico and Swimwear Plus and did some test shots. She died on December 19, 2016, aged 29.
- Atalya Slater is signed with Wilhelmina Models under the W Media division in New York and has walked for Jose Duran in New York Fashion Week and House of Dereon on the Tyra Show. She appeared in Source Magazine, New York Daily News, American Cheerleader magazine, Cosmogirl Prom F/W 2009, Cosmopolitan, April 2009 and has modeled for hair magazines. She also has a campaign with South Pole and had a Billboard in Times Square. Atalya played a female fan in the movie Notorious. She is also on the cover of the Book Friend Til the End. She has modeled on The View Elisabeth Hasselbeck's clothing line. and the clothing line Coogi. She featured in the Fabolous video "Throw it in the Bag". She has also appeared on the June 19, 2009, broadcast of The Today Show modeling swimwear and later Fall fashion. and appeared in Seventeen magazine August 2009 issue.
- Allison Kuehn is signed to DreamModels Workshop in Hong Kong and BMG Models in Chicago. She was previously with Ford Models in Milwaukee, Vue Model Management and I Model and Talent in Los Angeles. She has been in Wedding More, Jessica Code and Pop magazine. She currently lives in Hong Kong with cycle 1's Elyse Sewell.
- Amis Jenkins has done some test shoots; but she revealed on the Tyra Banks Show that the show helped her realize that she is not interested in modeling, but instead wants to pursue a styling career.
- Marvita Washington is signed with Ikon Model Management. She appeared in Ebony Magazine, December 2008. and Supermodels Unlimited. She has walked for various designers, including at BET's Rip the Runway 2009.
- Aimee Wright is signed to Heffner Model Management in Seattle, Washington.
- Claire Unabia signed to Empire Model Management in New York City. She has modeled for Fati Light and has an ad for Kodak. She appeared on the cover of Parents magazine with her daughter Halina in 2007 and February 2009 and was in Unvogue, New York Daily News and Supermodels Unlimited. Recently she appeared as one of the models for Ven Budhu on Project Runway season 10's season premier. A stock photo of Unabia was used to represent the character "Juliet" on the first season of HBO's Westworld.
- Stacy-Ann Fequiere is signed to Base Models in Miami. She has walked for various designers for Miami Funkshion fashion week and Toronto Fashion Week. She has modeled for Cooyah clothing, and appeared in the Seminole Hard Rock Hotel & Casino 2009 Calendar. She made it to the semi-finals of the Victoria's Secret model search. She appeared in magazines like Seventeen, JamRock, Fair Lady, Winter Park, Chellea, Vocess and Glamour South Africa. She also worked for Iman's Global Chic collection on HSN.
- Lauren Utter is signed to VIP Stars Models in New York. She has done some test shoots and starred in Modelville (see above) which she later quit. She modeled for Pomp and Circumstance magazine, Thorn and Class Struggle. She also appeared in the season finale on the sixth season of Project Runway.
- Katarzyna Dolinska ("Kat Doll") is signed with Elite Model Management in New York City and Ace Models in Athens, Greece, She has also walked in Athens Fashion Week S/S 09 for designers Vassilis Zoulias, Custo Barcelona, Elena Strongyliotou, Afroditi Hera. She walked for Issey Miyake in Paris Fashion Week F/W 09.10. She closed the Christophe Josse show in Paris Haute Couture fashion week S/S '09 and walked in Dilek Hanif Haute Couture S/S '09. She was one of the Top Models in Action featured in cycle 11 and was featured again in cycle 13. She was on a billboard with Jaslene Gonzalez in Times Square for a Lot 29 advertisement. She has been on the cover of Women's Wear Daily and TJF Magazine and has appeared in City Magazine, Cosmogirl, OZON, Young Magazine Greece, Cosmopolitan Greece, Diva Magazine Greece, LaMilk, L'Officiel. Gerlan Jeans Look Book, Vogue Australia, Italian Glamour, Bolero, Ninja Magazine and Tokion.
- Dominique Reighard has signed with House of Talent PA. She has won Modelville, as a result, she is currently a spokesmodel for Carol's Daughter. She was a contestant on the first All-Star Season of America's Next Top Model. She has been seen in J'Adore, Fashion Q&A, Ebony, C Magazine and Seventeen. Reighard had also been featured on the websites of Essence and Sovereign Soles and ads for Carol's Daughter and Grove City Dental. She has walked in Philippine Fashion Week for Michael Cinco and modeled for Bench in "Bench Universe" with Sophie Sumner and Allison Harvard. Dominique has released her first music video called "On Top of the World".
- Fatima Siad is currently signed with IMG Models NY. She has signed to New York Model Management, LA Model Management, Ace Models in Athens, Greece and Ice Models in Milan, Italy. She has been in In Fashion Magazine and Elle, March 2009 and July 2009. Siad has a contract with the Swiss cosmetic company, Arbonne and is one of the new faces for Arbonne FC5, appearing in ads for the products. She was in Marie Claire in July 2010. In addition, Siad had an ad campaign with BCBG Max Azria for their Spring/Summer 2010 campaign. She was also chosen for the Spring 2012 Herve Leger campaign by Max Azria. Fatima also walked for noted fashion houses such as Dries van Noten and Hermès during the Spring/Summer 2012 fashion week.
- Anya Kop is signed to Wilhelmina Models in New York and Style International Management in Hong Kong and was once signed with Elite Model Management. Rozova has appeared in both Level Magazine and Nylon Magazine. Rozova has appeared in several Hong Kong based publications including Elle Hong Kong, Cosmogirl Hong Kong, Marie Claire Hong Kong, Daily Sun, "Jessica Magazine" and Jessica Code. She shot a Fall 2009 campaign for the Chinese brand "Calfland". Anya has also appeared in Vogue Nippon. Anya walked the Nuj Novakhett and Julian Louie runway shows during New York Fashion Week Spring/Summer 2009 season. She also walked for shows during Hong Kong fashion week in the Fall/Winter 2009 season such as Fashion Shenzhen, Taipei in Style, In Full Bloom, HK Young Fashion Designers' Contest 2009, Brands Collection Show I and The 9th Footwear Design Competition Awards Hong Kong 2009. In August 2009, Rozova was featured in Project Runway All Star Challenge as one of the models for Sweet P Vaughn's collection.
- Whitney Thompson has collected her prizes though has since ended her representation with Elite Model Management and has since switched to Wilhelmina Models in New York. Whitney created a jewelry line called ShopSupermodel. She's also the spokesmodel for Smile Stylists, modeled for Metrostyle, JCPenney, People Magazine, Diana Warner Jewelry, Forever 21, Saks Fifth Avenue, the face for Torrid, Converse One Star, Fashion Bug, and a campaign with Pure Energy/Target, Fall 2010. She's also an ambassador for the National Eating Disorders Association, and a spokesperson for the Right Fit brand of Fashion Bug. She has also shot a CoverGirl commercial with Rihanna. In January 2010, Whitney became a model for the Faith 21 line by Forever 21. In 2015, she made an appearance on cycle 22 as a judge.

== Controversies ==
=== Kimberly ===
Months later after the second episode (see top), Kimberly Rydzewski appeared on the October 15, 2008, episode of The Tyra Banks Show together with fellow cycle 10 contestants Marvita Washington, Dominique Reighard and cycle 8 winner Jaslene Gonzalez where they talked about domestic violence. Rydzewski revealed later that the true reason she quit the contest was because she experienced depression, influenced by her ex-boyfriend's suicide three months prior to the competition, which in turn, revived her experiences of her mother's suicide when she was a child.

She explained that she initially wanted to join ANTM to help her divert her emotions, but she felt that it was not working and later used an ambiguous excuse to voluntarily leave the contest. She confessed that she really likes fashion and wanted to pursue it as a career. Rydzewski died on December 19, 2016, at the age of 29.

=== Property damages ===
During the contestants’ stay in New York, the models stayed in a $6 million apartment. However, when the season was over, it was revealed the contestants had caused over $500,000 in damages. The landlord Michael Marvisi explained that the girls had left food on the walls, damaged a $15,000 chandelier “beyond repair” and caused $90,000 of damage to a store below. He also said the film crew had punched “hundreds of holes in the ceiling to hang lighting equipment.” and had torn up the Brazilian wood floors. A $125K settlement deal was reached between the landlord and America's Next Top Model.
