= America's Next Top Model season 11 =

America's Next Top Model
- Season 11
- Judges: Tyra Banks; Nigel Barker; J. Alexander; Paulina Porizkova
- No. of contestants: 14
- Winner: McKey Sullivan
- No. of episodes: 13

Release
- Original network: The CW
- Original release: September 3 – November 19, 2008

Additional information
- Filming dates: May 20 – June 30, 2008

Season chronology
- ← Previous; Season 10 Next → Season 12

The eleventh cycle of America's Next Top Model premiered on September 3, 2008, and was the fifth season to be aired on The CW network. The promotional catchphrase of the cycle was "Feel The Love."

The prizes for this cycle were:

- A modeling contract with Elite Model Management.
- A fashion spread and cover in Seventeen.
- A US$100,000 contract with CoverGirl cosmetics.

Approximately the first half of the competition took place in Los Angeles, moving the show back from New York City where it was held last season. The international destination for the final episodes of the cycle was Amsterdam, the Netherlands. The promotional song was "When I Grow Up" by the Pussycat Dolls.

The winner was 19-year-old McKey Sullivan from Lake Forest, Illinois with Samantha Potter placing as the runner up.

== Season summary ==
Starting from this cycle, the contestant called first in judging every week would have her picture (or commercial) displayed as digital art in the models' house for the rest of the week. The CoverGirl of the Week contest was replaced by a new segment called Top Models in Action, focusing on former alums post-show careers.

The show featured fourteen contestants, similar to cycles 3, 4 and 10. The winner of this cycle, similar to the past four cycles, won management and representation by Elite Model Management, a $100,000 contract with CoverGirl cosmetics, and the cover and six-page fashion spread in Seventeen. This season averaged 4.43 million viewers.

This cycle included a first for the series – having a transgender contestant named Isis King participate and qualify for the top fourteen. The inclusion has been noted as an "unprecedented opportunity" by Neil Giuliano, president of GLAAD, a national LGBT media advocacy group.

== Contestants ==
(Ages stated are at time of contest)

Contestant	Age	Height	Hometown	Finish	Place
Sharaun Brown	18	5 ft 10 in (1.78m)	Chicago, Illinois	Episode 2	14
Nikeysha Clarke	19	5 ft 11 in (1.80m)	Allerton, New York	Episode 3	13
Brittany Rubalcaba	19	5 ft 11 in (1.80m)	Henderson, Nevada	Episode 4	12
Hannah White	18	5 ft 9.in (1.74m)	Fairbanks, Alaska	Episode 5	11
Isis King	22	5 ft 7 in (1.70m)	Prince George's County, Maryland	Episode 5	10
Clark Gilmer	19	5 ft 10 in (1.78m)	Pawleys Island, South Carolina	Episode 6	9
Lauren Brie Harding	20	5 ft 9 in (1.75m)	Charlottesville, Virginia	Episode 7	8
Joslyn Pennywell	23	5 ft 11 in (1.80m)	Lucky, Louisiana	Episode 9	7
Sheena Sakai	21	5 ft 11 in (1.80m)	Harlem, New York	Episode 10	6
Elina Ivanova	18	5 ft 10 in (1.78m)	Seattle, Washington	Episode 11	5
Marjorie Conrad	19	5 ft 11 in (1.80m)	San Francisco, California	Episode 12	4
Lio Tipton	19	5 ft 9.75 in (1.77m)	Sacramento, California	Episode 13	3
Samantha Potter	18	5 ft 11 in (1.80m)	Woodland Hills, California	Episode 13	2
McKey Sullivan	19	6 ft 0 in (1.83m)	Lake Forest, Illinois	Episode 13	1

== Episodes ==
No. overall	No. in season	Title	Original release date	US viewers (millions)
123	1	"The Notorious Fierce Fourteen"	September 3, 2008	3.51
The 33 contestants were driven to San Fernando Valley, where they met Jay Manuel "Alpha J" and J. Alexander "Beta J" at the fictitious "Top Model Institute of Technology." Inside, they went through a series of reviews and catwalk analysis. Later, Tyra Banks "Tyra Bot" met the contestants and individual interviews began. In between, Isis revealed she is a trans woman, leaving other 33 contestants with mixed feelings. Surprising some of the other contestants, Joslyn confessed that she tried to audition for America's Next Top Model for over 30 times (revealed to be 33 on The Tyra Banks Show) and she left on the product on the commercial, and Analeigh revealed that they were sold to a Saudi Arabian prince by a human trafficking ring pretending to be an agency, but it was later resolved before any deals were made . Twenty of those vying continued and they took part in the first photo shoot – posing in metallic blue catsuits. After final deliberations, fourteen contestants were chosen. Kacey Leggett failed to make the final cut. (Note: Kacey Leggett would come back two years later for the fifteenth Cycle where she would successfully become an official contestant.)
124	2	"Top Model Inauguration"	September 3, 2008	3.51
As the start of the episode, the three Brittanys changed their names. To avoid confusion, Brittney B became ShaRaun, Brittany S became McKey, and Brittany R remained with her own name. The notorious fierce fourteen contestants were driven to their homebase loft in Los Angeles, California. The contestants asked Isis questions regarding her gender transition, drawing both empathy and disdain. Clark and Hannah gossiped about Isis, calling her a he-she and saying that she had "no place in this competition." The next day, they visited Magic Castle, a private club for magicians, where judges Nigel Barker, Paulina Porizkova and the Jays conducted one-on-one interviews with the contestants. Isis impressed Nigel with her knowledge about how to flatter her face in certain light, while ShaRaun left the judges cold by constantly introducing herself in the show. The photo shoot theme was voting each portrayed with a political issue. During the shoot, several of the other contestants, including Clark and ShaRaun, heckled Isis about being transgender, while McKey struggled until drawing inspiration from boxing moves, which Clark laughed at. During panel, McKey's picture received tremendous praise. Isis also shocking everyone in the show that she can bring a powerful photograph, while Marjorie, Joslyn and Elina also received unanimous praise for their photos. The judges were unimpressed with ShaRaun’s photo, her interview and her insincere personality. They were also put off by Nikeysha's verbosity during her critique, despite a strong photo. In the end, ShaRaun and Nikeysha landed in the bottom two. Nikeysha for consistently interrupting the judges and ShaRaun's arrogant personality. However, ShaRaun's swagger, yet lack of modeling potential cost her the competition.: Featured photographer: Mike Rosenthal; Special guests: Ed Alonzo, Christian Marc, Sutan; Top Model in Action: Toccara Jones (cycle 3)
125	3	"The Ladder of Model Success"	September 10, 2008	3.86
The contestants met posing coach Benny Ninja and contortionist Bree Robertson for a lesson on extreme posing inside fabric tubes. The following day, the posing challenge featured Tarina Tarantino jewelry and handbags. Many of the contestants utilized awkward poses, and Sheena's inappropriately suggestive pose was criticized. Elina won the challenge, and received a handbag full of the featured jewelry for being the best, as well as the unaired prize to do some work with the brand. At the house, Isis was shown injecting hormones to aid in her gender transition which made her nauseous. Elina kissed Clark during a game of truth or dare. Tensions rose when Hannah – who had already made nasty comments about Isis – absent-mindedly pushed Isis for "crowding her" in the jacuzzi, even though she was surrounded by other contestants, and was later confronted about it in a large discussion inside, and then again later on where some of the other girls accused of her discrimination towards Isis and towards the girls of darker skin. The photo shoot challenged the models to hang from a rope ladder, with the images later digitally composited to photos of a hot air balloon. At judging, after first denying that she had surgery, Sheena admits she did have breast augmentation. Lauren Brie's photo was perceived as one of the best pictures in the history of the show and was Tyra's all-time favorite picture at the time. While most of the girls also impressed the judges, Brittany's photo was deemed average (but Tyra was convinced that she can earn a million dollars doing catalog modeling) and Analeigh was criticised for overthinking the shoot, which showed in their picture. Isis' plain appearance at the judging panel and uninspiring close-up photo landed her in the bottom two with Nikeysha, who was eliminated in her second consecutive bottom two appearance for an unsatisfactory photo, together with her overly-verbal personality and an admonishment for her very thin body and she continued to talk, even after getting eliminated, and was heard still talking as the credits rolled.: Featured photographer: Mike Ruiz; Special guests: Benny Ninja, Tarina Tarantino, Bree Robertson; Top Model in Action: Shannon Stewart (cycle 1)
126	4	"You're Beautiful, Now Change"	September 17, 2008	4.26
Tyra joined the contestants over princess-themed pizza, after which she announced that makeovers would commence the following day. But in a twist, as she was about to announce their makeovers, an evil witch (Miss J) appeared and gave her an apple, which turned out to be 'poisonous' as Tyra then fainted. She was revived by 'Prince Couture' (Mr. Jay) but told the contestants she could no longer remember their makeovers. The next day, all mirrors inside of the salon were covered, indicating that the contestants will only see their new looks when they are finalized. Most contestants were satisfied, except Elina, who cried, expressing that her look did not fit the image she had of herself. Afterwards, the contestants were taken to Walmart for a CoverGirl makeup challenge in which they had to record a 30-second mock commercial without a script. Hannah's commercial was deemed the best, earning her a featured spot on the CoverGirl website and a US$1,000 Walmart gift card. Back at the house Brittany and Joslyn talked about how much they loved their families and how much they missed them. Elina passed by and admitted that she never loved her mother, saying that she didn’t know how to be a mother and her not being able to express her emotions. She said that’s the best reason why she had been in control. Brittany then said that Elina was ungrateful and that she was using her mother which made Elina uncomfortable. The girls took part in a Sports Illustrated-style photo shoot featuring Susan Holmes swimwear. As some added pressure to the situation, Holmes herself was present for the shoot, and Jay Manuel held back all critique and direction. At judging, Elina was praised for her edgy ambiguous look. Lauren Brie's photo loved a lot, especially Miss J and Clark was compared to Lauren Brie by Paulina, with them stating she was the complete opposite of Lauren Brie; Clark looked like a model in person, but her photos were lackluster and vice versa. Most contestants received praise, but Isis, Analeigh, Hannah and Brittany struggled. Isis was once again criticised for her weak eye expression in her photo, though her pose received positive critique. Analeigh and Brittany landed in the bottom two; Analeigh for not utilising their posing potential as a former ice skater, and Brittany for continuing to come across as too commercial and not exhibiting intensity in her photos. In the end, Brittany was eliminated.: Featured photographer: Russell James; Special guests: Susan Holmes, Neil Weisberg, Amanda George, Kiyah Wright, Cristen Chin Barker; Top Model in Action: Lisa Jackson (cycle 9)
127	5	"Fierce Eyes"	September 24, 2008	4.13
The contestants got a runway lesson at a bowling alley from J. Alexander. The next day, they participated in a runway show for fashion designer Jeremy Scott. There were two twists. Firstly, the contestants would be wearing see-through blindfolds, and secondly, one contestant would be instantly eliminated following the challenge. Notable standouts on the runway included Joslyn, Analeigh, McKey, Isis, and Sheena, though most girls also excelled. Despite being instructed not to do so, Samantha pulled up her dress while posing on the runway. Joslyn's performance was deemed the best, winning her a photoshoot for Seventeen which she shared with Isis and Sheena. The least impressive contestants were Hannah and Samantha, Hannah was eliminated due to her overall poor performance together with her terrible runaway walk. This week's photoshoot took place in their own pool, with Nigel Barker photographing the contestants. The girls were to pose with their faces partially underwater, with an emphasis on their eyes. While many received positive feedback, Elina and Joslyn struggled with the shoot, as did Isis, who was awkward in the pool because she felt uncomfortable wearing a swimsuit. At judging, Clark's huge improvement inspired everyone in the place, as she produced a super strong photo with very fierce eyes. Analeigh also improved significantly from the last week, finally using their ice skating ability to create a photo with strong, fierce eyes. Sheena's photo was deemed by Tyra as an "Asian warrior that is going to kill you", while Lauren Brie impressed for the third consecutive week. Despite having a strong photo, Samantha was strongly reprimanded by Jeremy Scott, because she was acting like a know-it-all and seemed to want to be the rockstar of the runway show, and she ended up in the bottom two along with Isis. In the end, Samantha was spared and Isis was eliminated, praising on her LGBT community.: Featured photographer: Nigel Barker; Special guests: Jeremy Scott, Ann Shoket, Kira Plastinina; Top Model in Action: Chantal Jones (cycle 9)
128	6	"Natural Beauty"	October 1, 2008	4.03
The contestants met Paulina Porizkova at an empty warehouse for a challenge teach, where they were taught how to make an oversized outfit that will fit them well and carry off the pose. After the lecture, each contestant was assigned an outfit to improvise and fit themselves. Samantha was admonished over physically altering the dress’s look, while McKey's creativity won her the challenge and the reward of 50 extra frames at their next photo shoot. Back at the house, Marjorie's insecurities irritated some of the other contestants. This week’s photo shoot had the contestants portray disasters in California. Most contestants received praise for their photos, though Lauren Brie was cautioned not to rely on just being pretty. However, it was Clark and Joslyn's mediocre photos that landed them in the bottom two both for the first time ever. The judges saw Joslyn as starting out at the top of the pack, but slowly falling, while Clark’s lackluster portfolio had the judges worried. In the end, Joslyn's bubbly personality saved her and Clark was ultimately sent home.: Featured photographer: Brian Edwards; Special guest: Paulina Porizkova; Top Model in Action: Eugena Washington (cycle 7)
129	7	"Fiercee Awards"	October 8, 2008	3.93
The contestants were driven to a photo studio where they met Tyra for a teach on how to create and improve on their "signature poses." While Lauren Brie disappointed by producing what Tyra deemed as pretty but "empty" photos, Marjorie’s high-fashion take on The Hunchback of Notre-Dame impressed Tyra – and won her the challenge. She chose Analeigh to share in her prize of diamond necklaces from Rafinity totaling US$12,000. For this week's photo shoot, the contestants were taken to the Orpheum Theatre in downtown Los Angeles to portray different award show mishaps inspired from Tyra’s Fiercee Awards on The Tyra Banks Show. Marjorie and Analeigh wowed Jay, while Elina had trouble letting go of her control and freeing her emotions. Marjorie's dramatic photo received unfavorably great praise, with her reward win earned her a very clear first call-out. Analeigh’s photo yet again wowed the judges, as well as McKey and Elina. In the end, Lauren Brie and Sheena were placed in the bottom two – both for their flawed photos. The judges perceived Lauren Brie's personality as being washed out, while Sheena was criticized for her overt sexual appeal and her presence being a model. Sheena's personality won the judges over despite having a slightly weaker portfolio. The judges had then to eliminate Lauren Brie in the competition.: Featured photographer: Mike Rosenthal; Special guests: Jim De Yonker, Kiyah Wright, Ann Mangini; Top Model in Action: Danielle Evans (cycle 6)
130	8	"Top Model 11 Confidential"	October 15, 2008	3.21
This was the recap episode featuring some never-before-seen footage, including Samantha being left without a bed at the start of the competition, an argument between Elina and Sheena regarding animal rights and respect for others' beliefs, McKey cooking meals for the girls because she felt left out, Sheena losing her hair during her makeover, the contestants admiring Nikeysha's talent for rapping, a night out at Red Pearl Kitchen in Hollywood, a bee attack (with McKey saving the bee after it is hairsprayed by Clark), and Hannah talking about her life in Alaska and "Alaska Pixie Dust.": Top Model in Action: Nicole Linkletter (cycle 5)
131	9	"Now You See Me, Now You Don't"	October 22, 2008	4.44
The contestants got a lesson from the Aswirl Twins on how to properly showcase a garment. This was immediately followed by a challenge in which the contestants wore green bodysuits to mask their bodies via greenscreen, while modeling clothing for Petro Zillia, judged by Ann Shoket. While many were criticized, Elina was chosen as the winner, and got to shoot a holiday fashion spread for Seventeen along with Analeigh and Marjorie. When they returned, Elina and Sheena argued on whether it was hypocritical for Elina, an atheist, to appear in a holiday spread. The following day, the contestants met Cycle 10 winner Whitney Thompson for a CoverGirl commercial shoot. They were allotted five takes and got to read their lines from a teleprompter. While some excelled and others struggled, Joslyn was ill and had a particularly difficult time. At judging, Tyra challenged the contestants to walk in wooden clogs, leading her to announce that they would be going abroad to Amsterdam, though one contestant would be eliminated first. Analeigh was praised highly, with Tyra stating that their commercial was the best ever in the show's history. Sheena was also praised for her personality in the commercial. However, Elina was once again lambasted for being too constrained. Conversely, Joslyn was told that she overacted, but overall, she was lauded for pulling through and doing the commercial despite being very ill. McKey was surprisingly criticized for having a mediocre performance (despite having previous strong photos). Though McKey had a bad commercial, Elina and Joslyn ended up as the bottom two. Tyra then noted that Elina had composure and confidence, while Joslyn possessed tenacity and determination. Both Sheena and Samantha were shown cheering for Joslyn. However, in a shocking elimination, though she was called a "survivor," Joslyn was axed for her declining performance, but was told that she could survive the modeling industry without winning the contest.: Featured commercial director: Frank Ockenfels; Special guests: Whitney Thompson, James St. James, Nony Tochterman, Ann Shoket, Ron Harris, Richard Harris, Aswirl Twins, Elyssa Traub; Top Model in Action: Jaslene Gonzalez (cycle 8)
132	10	"Planes, Trains and Automobiles"	October 29, 2008	3.90
When the contestants arrived in Schiphol Airport at Amsterdam, they were greeted by Holland's Next Top Model host Daphne Deckers. They were split into pairs to find their house through a series of tasks. Elina and Samantha were the quickest and earned 50 extra frames to share. The contestants then went to the Red Light district for yet another challenge, this time posing as store-front models selling various designers' dresses. While Marjorie was singled out as the best contestant, McKey and Samantha won the prize to appear in several runway shows in Amsterdam International Fashion Week because of their teamwork. For the photo shoot, the contestants posed in 17th century couture gowns on a boat. McKey, Analeigh and Marjorie received positive comments, while Samantha used her extra frames to deliver better shots. Elina's focus made her ignore Jay at one point. At panel, McKey and Analeigh once again impressed the judges. Though Samantha was also appreciated for producing a stellar picture, her poor choice of clothing was criticized. Marjorie was also given a good critique, but her timid personality didn't sit well with Daphne. Elina again landed in the bottom two with Sheena; Sheena was criticized for her inconsistency and trouble controlling both her body and face together, while Elina was again chastised for her stiffness and uninspiring in-person look. However, deemed to have more potential, Elina was saved for the second time in a row thus eliminating Sheena in her second bottom two appearance.: Featured photographer: Andy Tan; Special guests: Daphne Deckers, Jan Taminiau, Carlo Wijnands, Edwin Oudshoorn, Bas Kosters, Mariette Hoiting; Top Model in Action: Katarzyna Dolinska (cycle 10)
133	11	"The Final Five"	November 5, 2008	3.81
The top five contestants went on go-sees. Marjorie became lost and frustrated causing her to not book either of the two designers she managed to see; Samantha was told she was too commercial but managed to book two out of four; Elina, because of her tattoos, only booked two out of the four she visited; McKey was booked by all four of her go-sees, but was disqualified from the challenge for being five minutes late. As a result, Analeigh won US$18,000 worth of designer clothes for booking all three of the three designers they saw. This time Tyra was the photographer and took two pictures of the contestants – one with no makeup, and one with edgy and glamorous styling, with a warehouse background. Marjorie struggled on the first shoot, but excelled at the second. Elina was once again too controlling, while Samantha and McKey shone in both shoots. Analeigh was amazing in their glamour shot, but Tyra wasn't sure if they could pull off a washed face look. At panel, Samantha's photos were deemed the best and she was called first. Elina and Marjorie both landed in the bottom two because they stood in their own way (Marjorie's nerves and Elina's control), but with her third consecutive bottom two appearance, Elina was eliminated and Marjorie was given another chance.: Featured photographer: Tyra Banks; Special guests: Frederick Koster, Pearl Macnack, Marlies Dekkers, Monique Collignon, Hans Ubbink, Mart Visser; Top Model in Action: Mollie Sue Steenis-Gondi (cycle 6)
134	12	"Good Times and Windmills"	November 12, 2008	3.71
The top four contestants got a lesson from Paulina Porizkova on modeling with unusual props. They were then challenged to audition for a short commercial in which they kissed male model Mark Vanderloo. Marjorie was chosen as the winner, and received a US$10,000 shopping spree at G-Star which she shared evenly with Analeigh. That evening, the contestants let loose when they invited their go-sees boatmen from the previous episode to the house. As Marjorie was the only girl in the house who drank alcohol, she ended up getting drunk and eventually Analeigh had to look after her. The photo shoot was set in the Dutch Countryside, with windmills as the backdrop accompanied by dramatic hair and makeup. Analeigh and McKey excelled once again while Samantha and Marjorie struggled. At judging, Samantha was again criticized for her unprofessional appearance and for having a bad film overall despite producing a good photo. Analeigh won best photo, with editor-in-chief of Seventeen magazine, Ann Shoket, describing her as “a contestant to be reckoned with”. Despite a stellar portfolio, Marjorie was admonished for having lost her appeal in her attempt to act more aloof, which sent her home.: Featured photographer: Barrie Hullegie; Special guests: Richard Gorodecky, Mark Vanderloo, JM Van Tilburg, Ann Shoket; Top Model in Action: Kim Stolz (cycle 5)
135	13	"America's Next Top Model is..."	November 19, 2008	4.84
The top three contestants have their CoverGirl commercials would be the next day. When they arrived, the contestants found out that the commercials would be shot on a boat traveling through Amsterdam, and that they would each have to deliver a "scene-stealing kiss" with Dutch male model Timothy Dingeman at the end of the commercial. Samantha's commercial lacked energy while Analeigh went blank and had to be fed the lines. McKey produced a stunning commercial, improving immensely from her first commercial performance. Afterwards, all the contestants shot their CoverGirl print ads. At panel, McKey received unanimous praise for both her commercial and photo, Analeigh and Samantha landed in the bottom two and Analeigh was sent home. Samantha joined McKey after surviving three bottom two appearances.: Featured photographer: Jim de Yonker; Samantha and McKey joined Cycle 10 winner Whitney Thompson and Holland's Next Top Model Cycle 4 winner Ananda Marchildon and runner-up Yvette Broch, at a long, whimsical, fairy tale-themed fashion show. The final two showed consistent walks, although both were critiqued that they were not as strong as they could have been. During deliberation, the judges recognized that the final two had stunning portfolios, and had greatly improved as models from their first shoot. McKey's photogenic look, edginess, diversity and strut were acknowledged as well as Samantha having commercial appeal while simultaneously delivering high fashion photos. McKey was crowned as the eleventh winner of America's Next Top Model.: Featured photographer: Nigel Barker; Featured commercial directors: Jay Manuel, Elyssa Traub; Special guests: Whitney Thompson, Ananda Marchildon, Addy van den Krommenacker, Ann Shoket, Yvette Broch; Top Model in Action: Anya Kop (cycle 10)

== Summaries ==
=== Call-out order ===
Order	Episodes												
Order	1 (Note: In episode 1, the pool of 33 girls was reduced to 14. This call-out order does not reflect their performances that week.)	2	3	4	5	6	7	9	10	11	12	13	
1	Sheena	Marjorie	Lauren Brie	Elina	Clark	Samantha	Marjorie	Analeigh	McKey	Samantha	Analeigh	McKey	McKey
2	Analeigh	Isis	Elina	Lauren Brie	Analeigh	Analeigh	Analeigh	Sheena	Analeigh	McKey	Mckey	Samantha	Samantha
3	Nikeysha	McKey	Joslyn	Samantha	Lauren Brie	McKey	McKey	Samantha	Marjorie	Analeigh	Samantha	Analeigh	
4	Marjorie	Joslyn	Marjorie	McKey	Sheena	Elina	Samantha	Marjorie	Samantha	Marjorie	Marjorie		
5	Samantha	Elina	McKey	Sheena	McKey	Marjorie	Elina	McKey	Elina	Elina			
6	Elina	Samantha	Samantha	Joslyn	Marjorie	Lauren Brie	Joslyn	Elina	Sheena				
7	Brittany	Brittany	Sheena	Marjorie	Joslyn	Sheena	Sheena	Joslyn					
8	McKey	Sheena	Hannah	Clark	Elina	Joslyn	Lauren Brie						
9	Sharaun	Analeigh	Clark	Isis	Samantha	Clark							
10	Hannah	Clark	Brittany	Hannah	Isis								
11	Lauren Brie	Lauren Brie	Analeigh	Analeigh	Hannah								
12	Isis	Hannah	Isis	Brittany									
13	Clark	Nikeysha	Nikeysha										
14	Joslyn	Sharaun											

The contestant was eliminated
The contestant was eliminated outside of judging panel
The contestant won the competition

=== Bottom two ===
Episode	Contestants	Eliminated
2	Nikeysha & Sharaun	Sharaun
3	Isis & Nikeysha	Nikeysha
4	Analeigh & Brittany	Brittany
5	Isis & Samantha	Hannah
5	Isis & Samantha	Isis
6	Clark & Joslyn	Clark
7	Lauren Brie & Sheena	Lauren Brie
9	Elina & Joslyn	Joslyn
10	Elina & Sheena	Sheena
11	Elina & Marjorie	Elina
12	Marjorie & Samantha	Marjorie
13	Analeigh & Samantha	Analeigh
13	McKey & Samantha	Samantha

The contestant was eliminated after their first time in the bottom two
The contestant was eliminated after their second time in the bottom two
The contestant was eliminated after their third time in the bottom two
The contestant was eliminated outside of the judging panel
The contestant was eliminated in the final judging and placed as the runner-up

=== Average call-out order ===
Casting call-out order and final two are not included.

Rank by average	Place	Model	Call-out total	Number of call-outs	Call-out average
1	1	McKey	34	11	3.09
2	2	Samantha	42	11	3.82
3	4	Marjorie	39	10	3.90
4	3	Analeigh	47	11	4.27
5	5	Elina	41	9	4.56
6	8	Lauren Brie	31	6	5.17
7	6	Sheena	46	8	5.75
8	7	Joslyn	41	7	5.86
9	9	Clark	37	5	7.40
10	10	Isis	33	4	8.25
11	12	Brittany	29	3	9.67
12	11	Hannah	30	3	10.00
13	13	Nikeysha	26	2	13.00
14	14	Sharaun	14	1	14.00

=== Photo shoot guide ===
- Episode 1: Futurists in a metallic blue catsuit (casting)
- Episode 2: Electoral promotion campaign
- Episode 3: Hanging on a rope ladder from a hot air balloon
- Episode 4: Swimsuits on Malibu beaches
- Episode 5: Fierces eyes above water
- Episode 6: Mod-style natural disasters
- Episode 7: Scenarios at an awards ceremony
- Episode 9: CoverGirl Eye Enhancers Blast commercial
- Episode 10: 17th century pirates on a clipper
- Episode 11: Simplistic and dramatic in a warehouse
- Episode 12: Windmill couture
- Episose 13: CoverGirl WetSlicks Amaze Mint Lipgloss commercial and print ad; Seventeen magazine covers

=== Makeovers ===
- Brittany - Long straight black weave
- Hannah - Katie Holmes inspired bob cut with bangs and dyed dark brown
- Isis - Long wavy dark brown weave
- Clark - Dyed chocolate brown
- Lauren Brie - Dyed platinum blonde
- Joslyn - Long curly black weave
- Sheena - Trimmed and dyed brown with blonde highlights
- Elina - Curly red weave
- Marjorie - Dyed light brown; later, cut shorter
- Analeigh - Layered and dyed blonde
- Samantha - Agyness Deyn inspired cut and dyed ice blonde
- McKey - Linda Evangelista inspired pixie cut and dyed black

== Post-Top Model careers ==
- Sharaun Brown signed with Elite Model Management in Chicago and LA. In 2025, she became a trophy presenter at the 2025 Grammy Awards.
- Nikeysha Clarke was still searching for an agency after having been kicked off the show in 2008.
- Brittany Rubalcaba left the modelling industry to further her education.
- Hannah White has taken test shots and signed with Nous Model Management.
- Isis King successfully underwent gender reassignment surgery; she had done test shots which were featured in The Tyra Banks Show together with her surgery. She also appeared on America's Next Top Model, Cycle 17, the first all-star edition of the show. In 2012, she became American Apparel's first openly transgender model.
- Clark Gilmer competed for Miss South Carolina USA earning her a spot in the top 10. She is a full-time professional model living in Los Angeles with boyfriend Kenny Florian. She appears on Enrique Iglesias music video "Tonight (I'm Lovin' You)" and Taylor Swift music video "Mean". She has appeared in Bravo's The Millionaire Matchmaker as a date for one of the millionaire bachelors." She also made two appearances on the hit TV show How I Met Your Mother, one in 2010 and the other one in 2011 as Barney Stinson's date.
- Lauren Brie Harding signed with Major Model in New York, MGMT First in New York, Muse Management in New York, L.A. Models, Nova Models in New Zealand and signed with Priscilla's Model Management in Sydney, Australia under the name "Brie."
- Joslyn Pennywell signed with an agency in Los Angeles and has done some test shoots. She has modeled for Reset Couture and appeared in a commercial. She walked at the Runway On Fire Fashion Show and Trendsetters fashion show. She also appeared in BET's The Family Crews and Bravo's The Millionaire Matchmaker as a date for one of the millionaire bachelors.
- Sheena Sakai signed with Model Management Group and Roman Personal Management. She has also modeled for 1800whoopass, appeared in a Trojan condoms commercial and walked in BET's Rip the Runway 2009. as well as She by Sheree SS 2010. Sakai also appeared on America's Next Top Model, Cycle 17, the first all-star edition of the show.
- Elina Ivanova has signed with TCM Models & Talent in Seattle and Vision Models in Los Angeles since 2013 and then signed with Elite Model Management in LA .
- Marjorie Conrad signed with Look Model Agency in San Francisco and was featured in the American Apparel Daily Update and opened a Marciano Fashion Show. In April 2014, she was working on her directorial debut "Chemical Cut" and launched a funding campaign on the website Kickstarter.
- Lio Tipton (credited as Analeigh Tipton through to 2021) signed with Abrams Artists Agency, in both the commercial and theatrical divisions and Ford Models in Los Angeles. They have appeared in campaigns for Forever 21, and Guess. They made their acting breakout starring as Jessica in the movie Crazy, Stupid, Love. Their acting has also booked them modeling campaigns for Teen Vogue, Maxim, Details, and Nylon. They starred in an American zombie romantic film Warm Bodies based on Isaac Marion's popular novel of the same name, which was released on February 1, 2013. In 2014, they were one of the leads in the ABC television series Manhattan Love Story before it was canceled due to low ratings. In 2021, Tipton came out as non-binary, changing pronouns to they/them and name to Lio.
- Samantha Potter signed with L.A. Models and has walked for designers Individuals by AMFI, EиD by Eva and Delia, Ready to Fish by Ilja Visser and Addy van de Krommenacker at Amsterdam International Fashion Week 2009 as part her prize in episode 10. She also appeared as one of the "Top Models in Action" in Cycle 12. In 2008, she appeared in The Big Bang Theory in the episode "The Panty Piñata Polarization", along with contestant Lio Tipton, but her role was a non-speaking one. Potter also appeared in gospel artists Mary Mary's music video for God In Me.
- McKey Sullivan collected all of her prizes and signed with Elite Model Management in Chicago. She was featured in the December 2008 issue of In Touch Weekly. She appeared on the cover and had a spread in the February 2009 issue of Seventeen magazine as part of her ANTM prize package. She also has been on the cover of Forest & Bluff Magazine, January 2009 issue and Nylon Magazine, March 2009. She was featured on Yahoo Style with Whitney Thompson in March 2009. She had the cover and a spread in Chicago Scene, June 2009, as well as various advertisements for Forever 21, Rendezvous, Myer, Crabtree and Evelyn and Sass and Bide. She also appeared on the September 2009 issue of Marie Claire modelling Oroton, Fendi and Miu Miu handbags and purses. Sullivan was featured on the Cover Fall 2009 cover and interior fashion spread of Vogue knitting magazine. She walked for EиD by Eva and Delia, Mada van Gaans, Ready to Fish by Ilja Visser and Addy van den Krommenacker at Amsterdam International Fashion Week 2009 as part her prize in episode 10. McKey also walked for G-Star at Mercedes-Benz Fashion Week Fall 2009. She walked in Trinidad and Tobago Fashion Week 2009 for Heather Jones Designs Limited. She appeared in Dutch Avantgarde with Samantha Potter. She also appeared on the runway for Mr. Jay's clothing line called "attitude" along with cycle 12 contestant with Aminat Ayinde. During her My Life as a CoverGirl commercials, it was revealed that she had been working with the Make-A-Wish Foundation. She was named one of People magazine's Most Beautiful People of 2009. She was also named the 44th sexiest woman of 2008 by BuddyTv.
