= America's Next Top Model season 9 =

America's Next Top Model
- Season 9
- Judges: Tyra Banks; Nigel Barker; J. Alexander; Twiggy
- No. of contestants: 13
- Winner: Saleisha Stowers
- No. of episodes: 13

Release
- Original network: The CW
- Original release: September 19 – December 12, 2007

Additional information
- Filming dates: May 28 – July 18, 2007

Season chronology
- ← Previous; Season 8 Next → Season 10

The ninth cycle of America's Next Top Model is the third season of the series to be aired on The CW network. This cycle's promotional tagline was "The Future has arrived." The promotional song was "Shut Up and Drive" by Rihanna.

The prizes for this cycle were:

- A modeling contract with Elite Model Management
- A fashion spread and cover in Seventeen magazine
- A US$100,000 contract with CoverGirl cosmetics

The international destinations for this cycle were St. John's, Antigua and Barbuda (for the semi-finals) and Shanghai and Beijing, China, the show's second visit to East Asia.

Among the top thirteen contestants was 21-year-old Heather Kuzmich, who has Asperger's syndrome, a form of autism spectrum disorder as well as ADHD. The season averaged 5.12 million viewers, making the cycle one of the most successful in the show's history. This was also the last cycle to date in which Twiggy was featured as a judge. For Cycle 10, she was replaced by Paulina Porizkova.

The winner was 21-year-old Saleisha Stowers from Los Angeles, California with Chantal Jones placing as the runner up.

== Contestants ==
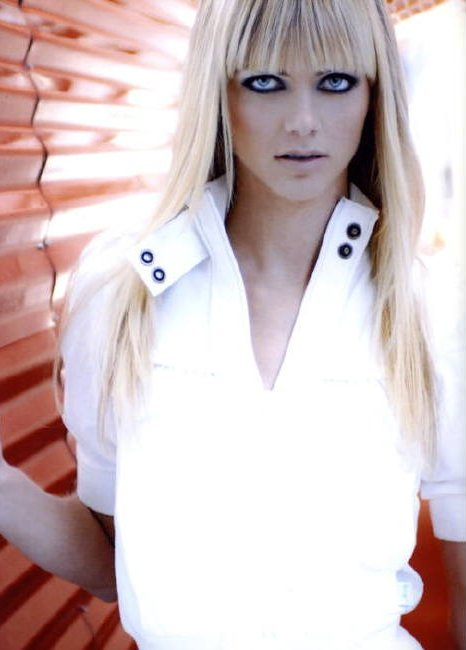
Chantal Jones

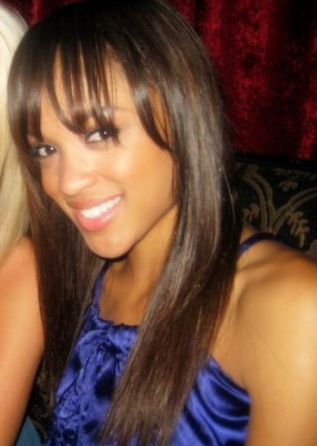
Saleisha Stowers

(Ages stated are at start of contest)

Contestant	Age	Height	Hometown	Finish	Place
Mila Bouzinova	20	5 ft 10 in (1.78 m)	Boston, Massachusetts	Episode 2	13
Kimberly Leemans	20	5 ft 11 in (1.80 m)	Ocala, Florida	Episode 3	12
Victoria Marshman	20	5 ft 10 in (1.78 m)	New Haven, Connecticut	Episode 4	11
Janet Mills	22	5 ft 9 in (1.75 m)	Bainbridge, Georgia	Episode 5	10
Ebony Morgan	20	6 ft 0 in (1.83 m)	Roseland, Illinois	Episode 6	9 (quit)
Sarah Hartshorne	20	5 ft 10 in (1.78 m)	Heath, Massachusetts	Episode 8	8
Ambreal Williams	19	5 ft 11 in (1.80 m)	Dallas, Texas	Episode 9	7
Lisa Jackson	20	6 ft 1.5 in (1.86 m)	Jersey City, New Jersey	Episode 10	6
Heather Kuzmich	21	6 ft 0 in (1.83 m)	Valparaiso, Indiana	Episode 11	5
Bianca Golden	18	6 ft 0 in (1.83 m)	Jamaica Hills, New York	Episode 12	4
Jenah Doucette	18	5 ft 11 in (1.80 m)	Farmington, Connecticut	Episode 13	3
Chantal Jones	19	6 ft 0 in (1.83 m)	Austin, Texas	Episode 13	2
Saleisha Stowers	21	5 ft 10 in (1.80 m)	Madera, California	Episode 13	1

== Episodes ==
No. overall	No. in season	Title	Original release date	US viewers (millions)
97	1	"The Girls Go Cruisin'"	September 19, 2007	5.22
Episode 1 premiered with 33 potential contestants. Each one received a phone call from Tyra Banks, announcing they were the 26 contestants. They convened at a port in San Juan, Puerto Rico and met J. Alexander. He gave the contestants boarding passes for a luxurious Royal Caribbean's Adventure of the Seas. This was to be their residence for the week until the 13 contestants were chosen. Their first task was to walk a runway modeling life jackets. At breakfast, the women met Tyra, before proceeding to their interviews with the judges. Memorable moments included Janet's mock waxing of Tyra, Heather revealing she had Asperger's Syndrome and A.D.H.D., and Lisa's revelation of being an exotic dancer (not nude, but wearing a swimsuit). They docked at St. John’s, Antigua for a beach photo shoot, where they met ANTM Cycle 8 winner, Jaslene Gonzalez. After the shoot, the 20 contestants were selected. Tyra asked the 20 contestants why they should become America's Next Top Model. Marvita Washington failed to make the final cut. (Note: Marvita would later come back for the next cycle where she would successfully become a contestant.): Featured photographer: Jim Wade; Special guests: Jaslene Gonzalez, Gregorio Cuevas, Patrick Dukes
98	2	"The Models Go Green"	September 26, 2007	4.90
In Episode 2, the 13 contestants were taken to Los Angeles. There, they were introduced to the new green theme of the cycle. The first photo shoot portrayed the negative sides of smoking. In one set of frames, they looked glamorous smoking. In the second set, they were shown how smoking had affected them. Heather and Saleisha agreed to decide to shoot together on a single side-effect theme. During the photo shoot, Bianca and Lisa clashed in an argument concerning Lisa's morals. The girls' first challenge was to create an outfit that was simple, yet fashionable, from Old Navy. They were given 10 minutes. The contestants went to Old Navy. Benny Ninja assisted and supervised them. The girls' outfits were judged at panel. Saleisha was determined to have the best outfit. She won US$1,000 and the chance to shoot an ad for Old Navy. Before the contestants were called in, Tyra said there would be no more smoking inside the model house, starting the following day. Many of them, especially Heather, Chantal, Sarah, and Lisa excelled, but Bianca, Ebony, and Mila struggled. Ebony and Mila found themselves in the bottom two. The judges felt that Ebony was too stiff, and that Mila did not take the photo shoot seriously. In the end, Ebony was chosen over Mila for displaying more potential and drive. At the end of Episode 2, the contestants were informed that smoking was banned as it set a bad example.: Featured photographer: Mike Rosenthal; Special guest: Benny Ninja; CoverGirl of the Week: Lisa Jackson
99	3	"The Girls Go Rock Climbing"	October 3, 2007	4.54
In Episode 3, some contestants helped Heather dress up to improve her image. The girls then proceeded to Fashion Madhouse. There, J. Alexander shocked the girls with a scary lesson: how to perfect their runway walk while wearing straitjackets. Miss J teased Heather because of her weak walk. She also teased Bianca as she showed her signature walk too much. Back at the house, Saleisha and Bianca got into a heated argument. The contestants participated in a couture runway challenge for Colleen Quen. After the challenge, Saleisha won a future trip to Paris for a Colleen Quen fashion show. For the photo shoot, the contestants were placed on a climbing wall while wearing couture gowns. Jenah was praised for her high fashion photo. Lisa, Heather, and Chantal shone in their shoots. Ebony, Bianca, and Kimberly struggled. Ebony managed to improve; she impressed the judges with a better shot than last week. Ultimately, it was Bianca and Kimberly who landed in the bottom two. Tyra stated that, besides herself, none of the judges liked Bianca's photo. Kimberly was unable to transfer her high-fashion appeal in person onto film and was sent home.: Special guests: Colleen Quen, Roy Campbell; Featured photographer: Matthew Jordan Smith; CoverGirl of the Week: Heather Kuzmich
100	4	"The Girl Who Goes Bald"	October 10, 2007	5.37
In Episode 4, the contestants received their makeovers at the Ken Pavés salon. Some girls, like Sarah and Chantal, embraced their new looks with positivity and excitement. It was initially intended that Bianca would have a long, blonde weave. However, her overly damaged hair wouldn't have been able to accept the weave. Instead, she was shaved bald. Bianca was given a blonde wig. However, it went unused for the rest of the season as the look suited her. The challenge involved the girls putting together a look, using CoverGirl cosmetics at a make-up table. It also included going through racks of clothes to find the outfit with their name on it. Janet was deemed by the judges as having the best make-up. Janet would have won. Since she didn't put on the correct outfit (Janet was unable to find it), she was disqualified. Sarah won the challenge. Her prize was the opportunity to shoot a tutorial video for the CoverGirl website on make-up application. This week's photo shoot had the girls portraying different plants. At panel, Tyra told Ebony that she would have been called first for having the best picture in the bunch. However, Ebony displayed an up-tight personality in front of the judges. Jenah, Heather, and Sarah once again stunned the judges. Lionel Deluy went as far as telling Jenah he'll use her when she gets signed. Bianca and Ebony surprised the judges with their improvements (in comparison to their previous shoots). Chantal was criticized for her inability to take in both the photographer's and the art director's instructions during the shoot. Saleisha's lack of emotion in her picture didn't sit well with the judges. When evaluating Victoria's cactus picture, Twiggy joked that it was a fitting representation since she felt Victoria has a "prickly disposition." Saleisha and Victoria ended up in the bottom two. Victoria was shockingly sent home for not handling criticism well.: Featured photographer: Lionel Deluy; Special guests: Ken Pavés, Dawn Patton, Brent Poer, Crissy Barker; CoverGirl of the Week: Heather Kuzmich
101	5	"The Girl Who is Afraid of Heights"	October 17, 2007	4.94
Episode 5 kicked off with a posing lesson. Vogueing expert Benny Ninja, taught the contestants how to pose in the air while jumping on a trampoline. Ambreal was praised for her natural ability to strike amazing poses. Heather and Lisa struggled with their awkwardness. Later, the top 10 contestants used what they learned from Benny for the next challenge. It was held at an ice rink. They would pose in the air while being hoisted by figure skater, Lloyd Eisler. The prize was an Akademiks photo shoot for Seventeen Magazine with cycle 6 winner, Danielle Evans (now known as Dani Evans). Lisa won the challenge. She picked Ebony and Janet to join her in the photos shoot. Lisa inadvertently caused some tension among some contestants as they felt that her win was undeserved. For the photo shoot, the contestants posed for high-fashion photos. They were costumed as gargoyles on the roof of the Omni Hotel building. Bianca and Ebony shocked Mr. Jay with their astounding progress. Jenah, Chantal, Heather, and Lisa all delivered. Sarah struggled to get into character. Janet worried about showing her underwear. Ambreal struggled against her fear of heights. At the judges' panel, most of the contestants received praise from the judges. Heather delivered another strong photograph, but the judges advised Heather she needed to model her face forwards as well (not just profile). Sarah was criticized for not grasping the concept of the shoot. Again, Ebony was cautioned about her uptight, in-person persona. Ebony was told that she would have been rewarded first place, if only she had smiled at the judges. The bottom two were Janet and Ambreal. Tyra felt that both girls had striking features and great personalities. However, the judges felt that Janet was constantly coached from photo shoot to photo shoot. Ambreal had worsened rather than improved but was given another chance. Janet was sent home.: Featured photographer: Mike Rosenthal; Special guests: Benny Ninja, Ann Shoket, Danielle Evans, Byron Kirkland, Lloyd Eisler, Marc Baptiste; CoverGirl of the Week: Heather Kuzmich
102	6	"The Girl Who Gets a Mango"	October 24, 2007	4.74
Episode 6 began at the house. Ebony shocked contestants by saying she no longer wanted to be there. Later on, male super model Tyson Beckford surprised the contestants by knocking on the door at the house. Tyson gave a lesson on how to be effective spokespersons. Most managed an impromptu sales pitch for their teacher. Some had a difficulty concentrating on their task. Later, the top 9 contestants were divided into three groups of three. Their assignment was to create public service announcements for the charity, Keep a Child Alive. One group (Heather, Jenah and Ambreal) at first struggled to create their announcement. However, they finally developed a great idea and won the challenge. The Director of Carol's Daughter placed the names of Heather, Jenah, and Ambreal in a basket for a random drawing. Heather's name was picked. Her prize was an opportunity for a photo shoot for Carol's Daughter (a beauty brand of body, hair, and skin products). Jenah and Ambreal each won huge gift baskets of Carol's Daughter products. Heather's photo shoot was directed by singer, Mary J. Blige who advised Heather on cosmetics and outfits for the shoot. Heather used this opportunity to practice shooting face-front pictures. (She was advised by the judges about this in Episode 5.) This episode's photo shoot had the girls model with various recyclable materials. Ebony and Ambreal struggled with their shoots. Heather received praise for not doing a single shot in profile. Saleisha, Jenah, Sarah, and Chantal excelled. Bianca was complimented for her practicing in the mirror and smiling with her eyes in most of her film. Lisa was told by Jay that she was doing well, but the judges criticized her for being too "Model 101." At judges' panel, due to their poor performances in the photo shoot, Ebony and Ambreal landed in the bottom two, both for the second time. Ebony was told she was uninspiring in both her film and her final photo. Ambreal appeared sleepy in her photo. Tyra called Ebony to receive her photo, but Ebony stated that she no longer wished to compete. All the contestants were astonished, especially Ambreal. After Tyra gave Ebody permission to quit, Ebony quit. Thus, Ambreal received "a free pass," allowing her to continue on in the competition.: Featured photographer: Fredric Reshew; Special guests: Tyson Beckford, Elizabeth Santiso, Lisa Price, Mary J. Blige, Matthew Rolston; CoverGirl of the Week: Heather Kuzmich
103	7	"The Girl Who Runs Into the Glass Door"	October 31, 2007	3.24
This was the recap episode of the season, reviewing the first six episodes of the cycle. It included some never-before-seen footage.This included: Miss J's fashion checkpoint at castings; Bianca running into a glass door; Jenah visiting the dentist over a chipped tooth; Tyra discussing body image with the girls; Janet teaching Bianca how to unclog the toilet; Jenah dealing with nicotine withdrawal; Bianca's confrontations with Saleisha, Chantal, Lisa and Heather; and the contestants playing a card game. During the latter, one of the girls spoke about Bianca's maturity and loss of her attitude after having all of her hair shaved off.
104	8	"The Girls Who Crawl"	November 7, 2007	5.10
In Episode 8, Sarah questioned her self-image. The house heated up when Bianca accused Heather of just “sitting pretty” and not doing anything extra to produce good photos. Tyra taught the ladies how to model in front of a moving camera. Later, the contestants shot a music video with Enrique Iglesias on his single, "Tired of Being Sorry". The girls met Enrique in their van. He said that one of them won the reward of being featured more in the video. They gathered again later where both Lisa and Heather were announced as the winners, incorporating a “Gothic” look in the video. During the filming, Heather fainted from exhaustion. At judges' panel, Lisa, Heather and Saleisha's clips received praise. Sarah was criticized for feeling embarrassed about her own body. In the end, she landed in the bottom two together with Chantal. Chantal's performance in the music video was lackluster. In the end, Sarah was eliminated.: Featured music video director: Jessy Terrero; Special guests: Enrique Iglesias, Billy Parks, Lisa Arianna; CoverGirl of the Week: Heather Kuzmich
105	9	"The Girl Who Starts to Lose Her Cool"	November 14, 2007	5.34
In Episode 9, the top seven contestants went to the Fashion Institute of Design & Merchandising. There, they were paired up with student fashion designers, as their muses. On the runway, the contestants showed off their outfits and explained their dresses. Heather and Lisa both stumbled in their performances. Saleisha was chosen as the challenge winner. The reward for the challenge was a photo shoot for Seventeen. Saleisha chose Bianca and Lisa to accompany her. For their photo shoot, the contestants were dropped off in the desert. There, they had to portray models stranded in the middle of nowhere, posing with a burning car. During the photo shoot, Heather's frustration over her poor challenge performance took its toll. She produced many mediocre takes. At judges' panel, the contestants were surprised by a lion dance. They were delightfully surprised to be told they're going to Shanghai, China, for the remainder of the competition. There were only six spots available. Most of the contestants received praise for their photos, especially Bianca and Jenah. Heather was informed that this was her weakest shoot to date. Ambreal was advised that she needed to work much harder. Lisa was advised she was fading away from the judges. In the end, Ambreal and Lisa landed in the bottom two. Ambreal was eliminated as the judges felt Lisa had more potential.: Featured photographer: Trevor O'Shana; Special guests: Benny Ninja, Neal Hamil, Ann Shoket, Angela Avanesyan, Richard Chan, Julia Chumak, Angelo Estrada, Justin Green, Erin Helgersun, Yuko Pena; CoverGirl of the Week: Heather Kuzmich
106	10	"The Girls Going to Shanghai"	November 21, 2007	3.64
In Episode 10, the top six contrstants flew to Shanghai and were brought to their suite. However, there were only five beds inside. When Saleisha refused to share the only king-sized bed, Heather was left without one. Jenah and Bianca ended up sharing the large bed. The contestants learned basic martial arts poses. Their challenge was to showcase their poses in the air on high wires. At the challenge, Bianca refused to pose in the air and disqualified herself. Heather won the challenge and was rewarded with a shopping spree. She chose Chantal to accompany her. This week, the contestants were told to wear clothes that showcased their personalities. They ended up shooting both a commercial and photo shoot for CoverGirl Queen collection. At panel, the judges felt all the girls struggled with either their commercials or their photo shoots. The judges decided that the commercials were more important than the photos. Chantal and Saleisha received relative praise for their commercial performances, despite unsatisfactory photos. Jenah was praised for her photo, but her personality was questioned by the judges. Heather and Lisa's commercial takes were deemed the worst. Thus, they landed in the bottom two, despite strong photos. Though her photo was deemed "warm and approachable," it was Lisa who was eliminated. Her ability to handle criticism was in question.: Featured photographer: Jim Wade; Featured commercial director: Jeffrey Chu; Special guests: Louis Liu, Brent Poer; CoverGirl of the Week: Heather Kuzmich
107	11	"The Girls Go on Go-See Adventures"	November 28, 2007	5.04
In Episode 11, the top five contestants were sent to PT Models in Shanghai for go-sees. Heather had difficulty finding her way around the city and visited only one designer. Jenah received bad comments about her personality and walk from the designers she visited. Bianca and Saleisha were the only two to make it back on time; Chantal (20 minute's late), Jenah (15 minute's late), and Heather (40 minute's late) were all disqualified for their tardiness. Bianca won the challenge. Her prize was having her picture used in a campaign for the 2008 Summer Olympics. Later, the contestants took part in a photo shoot with Nigel Barker, where they stood out in a crowd of Chinese lions and dragons. Some of Jenah's comments caused friction between her and Nigel, leaving Jenah to worry about her fate in the competition. During judges' panel, Tyra announced that the final four would go to Beijing for the remainder of the competition. Saleisha shone, while Bianca was critiqued for forgetting about her face in her photograph. Jenah's communication skills were questioned. Chantal was complimented for a beautiful picture. Chantal was praised for doing the best at the go-see challenge. Her photo received a ton of compliments from the judges. Jenah and Heather ultimately landed in the bottom two, both for their lack of communication skills. With that, Jenah's name was called to remain in the competition. Heather was eliminated.: Featured photographer: Nigel Barker; Special guests: Susan Yang, Shan Jin Ya, Lu Kun, Stephen Peng, Flora Zeta, Helen Lee, Fiona Vong; CoverGirl of the Week: Heather Kuzmich
108	12	"The Girls Go to the Great Wall"	December 5, 2007	4.63
In Episode 12, the top four contestants flew to Beijing, where they were introduced to the story of the Four Beauties. On the next day, they participated in a challenge in which they turned a traditional Chinese garment into their own style. During the task, Bianca purposefully gave Jenah bad advice. When Jenah was declared the winner, she instead chose Chantal to share her prize of custom-made Chinese qípáos gowns. Jenah also won a personalized runway lesson with Miss J. The contestants then traveled to the Great Wall for a Mongolian warrior-themed photo shoot, photographed by Tyra. Chantal excelled throughout the photo shoot by thinking outside of the box. Jenah, Saleisha, and Bianca struggled at first but had good takes at the end. Tyra was generally positive about all the contestants' performances. However, Tyra showed concern over Jenah's identity crisis and Bianca's stiff poses. The shoot concluded with a final group shot to see which contestant stood out the most. At judges' panel, all the photos were greeted with positive reviews. Tyra confessed that her opinions about the contestants had changed after photographing them. Tyra deemed Chantal's photos one of the best shots ever from the show. Saleisha was also praised for thinking outside the box, and using her whole body. Jenah explained that she was homesick, but cared greatly about the competition. Bianca argued that she had consistently improved. In the end, Bianca was eliminated for not demonstrating the same innate talent as the other contestants.: Featured photographer: Tyra Banks; Special guests: Kevin Lee, Ann Shoket; CoverGirl of the Week: Heather Kuzmich
109	13	"The Girl Who Becomes America's Next Top Model"	December 12, 2007	5.50
In Episode 13, the top three contestants were put to the test when they had to shoot a CoverGirl commercial for CoverGirl Wetslicks Fruit Spritzers. The girls got to choose from 12 fruity flavors to portray in their commercials. The top 3 contestants struggled with their commercials at first, but Chantal managed good takes in the end. Jenah's attitude came off as slightly abrasive to Jay. Saleisha (who was the weakest) asked for a minute to compose herself due to frustration. Before evaluation, the top 3 contestants were asked to critique their competition. top 3 contestants commented themselves as having the most potential. Jenah's laid-back attitude caused her to be deemed as having the least. As she was being evaluated, Jenah broke down into tears but was praised by Tyra for finally showing her real self to the panel. Jenah's and Chantal's photos were heavily praised while Saleisha's was criticized. Saleisha and Jenah landed in the bottom two. It was pointed out that Saleisha may have had modeling experience in the past. However, Saleisha's portfolio was hit and miss, though it was improving when they came overseas. While Chantal, without any modeling experience in the past, had taken much stronger photos than Saleisha. In the end, Jenah was eliminated in her third-consecutive, bottom- two appearance.: Featured photographer: Jim De Yonker; Featured commercial director: Brent Poer; The final two had a photo shoot for the February cover issue of Seventeen. The final runway took place near the Forbidden City. There, Saleisha and Chantal modeled Qi Gang's line of couture dresses. Cycle 8 winner, Jaslene Gonzalez, started off the show. Chantal was a bit stiff and had a slight accident when her dress tripped a stilt performer. Saleisha owned the runway show. Behind the scenes, Saleisha consoled Chantal, who was slightly distraught about tripping the stilt performer. During the final panel, the judges praised both finalists' personalities and their photos throughout the season. The judges praised Chantal's bubbly personality and blend of high-fashion and girl-next-door appeal. They comments about Saleisha’s commercial ability and holistic modeling potential. The girls were called back. Saleisha (who is now known as Sal Stowers ) was declared the ninth winner of America's Next Top Model.: Special guests: Qi Gang, Darren Duan, Ann Shoket, Jaslene Gonzalez, Stephen Danelian

== Summaries ==
=== Call-out order ===
Order	Episodes												
Order	1 (Note: In episode 1, the pool of 33 girls was reduced to 13. This call-out order does not reflect their performances that week.)	2	3	4	5	6 (Note: In episode 6, Ambreal was originally eliminated; however, Ebony's choice to quit automatically saved her from elimination.)	8	9	10	11	12	13	
1	Mila	Heather	Jenah	Jenah	Lisa	Saleisha	Lisa	Bianca	Chantal	Saleisha	Chantal	Chantal	Saleisha
2	Bianca	Lisa	Heather	Sarah	Bianca	Jenah	Heather	Jenah	Saleisha	Bianca	Saleisha	Saleisha	Chantal
3	Jenah	Chantal	Lisa	Heather	Ebony	Heather	Saleisha	Saleisha	Bianca	Chantal	Jenah	Jenah	
4	Chantal	Sarah	Chantal	Lisa	Chantal	Bianca	Bianca	Chantal	Jenah	Jenah	Bianca		
5	Ambreal	Jenah	Sarah	Janet	Jenah	Sarah	Ambreal	Heather	Heather	Heather			
6	Victoria	Saleisha	Ambreal	Ambreal	Saleisha	Chantal	Jenah	Lisa	Lisa				
7	Sarah	Ambreal	Victoria	Ebony	Heather	Lisa	Chantal	Ambreal					
8	Saleisha	Victoria	Saleisha	Bianca	Sarah	Ebony	Sarah						
9	Kimberly	Janet	Janet	Chantal	Ambreal	Ambreal							
10	Ebony	Kimberly	Ebony	Saleisha	Janet								
11	Janet	Bianca	Bianca	Victoria									
12	Heather	Ebony	Kimberly										
13	Lisa	Mila											

The contestant was eliminated
The contestant quit the competition
The contestant was originally eliminated but was saved
The contestant won the competition

=== Bottom two ===
Episode	Contestants	Eliminated
2	Ebony & Mila	Mila
3	Bianca & Kimberly	Kimberly
4	Saleisha & Victoria	Victoria
5	Ambreal & Janet	Janet
6	Ambreal & Ebony	Ebony
6	Ambreal & Ebony	Ambreal
8	Chantal & Sarah	Sarah
9	Ambreal & Lisa	Ambreal
10	Heather & Lisa	Lisa
11	Heather & Jenah	Heather
12	Bianca & Jenah	Bianca
13	Saleisha & Jenah	Jenah
13	Chantal & Saleisha	Chantal

The contestant was eliminated after her first time in the bottom two
The contestant was eliminated after her second time in the bottom two
The contestant was eliminated after their third time in the bottom two
The contestant quit the competition
The contestant was originally eliminated but was saved.
The contestant was eliminated in the final judging and placed as the runner-up

=== Average call-out order ===
Casting call-out order and final two are not included.

Place	Model	Episodes											Call-Out Total	# of Call-Outs	Call-Out Average	Rank by Average
Place	Model	2	3	4	5	6	7	9	10	11	12	13	Call-Out Total	# of Call-Outs	Call-Out Average	Rank by Average
1	Saleisha	6	8	10	6	1	3	3	2	1	2	2	44	11	4.00	5th
2	Chantal	3	4	9	4	6	7	4	1	3	1	1	43	11	3.91	4th
3	Jenah	5	1	1	5	2	6	2	4	4	3	3	36	11	3.27	1st
4	Bianca	11	11	8	2	4	4	1	3	2	4		50	10	5.00	6th
5	Heather	1	2	3	7	3	2	5	5	5			33	9	3.67	2nd
6	Lisa	2	3	4	1	7	1	6	6				30	8	3.75	3rd
7	Ambreal	7	6	6	9	9	5	7					49	7	7.00	8th
8	Sarah	4	5	2	8	5	8						32	6	5.33	7th
9	Ebony	12	10	7	3	8							40	5	8.00	9th
10	Janet	9	9	5	10								33	4	8.25	10th
11	Victoria	8	7	11									26	3	8.67	11th
12	Kimberly	10	12										22	2	11.00	12th
13	Mila	13	SAFE	SAFE	SAFE	SAFE	SAFE	SAFE	SAFE	SAFE	SAFE	SAFE	13	1	13.00	13th
		SAFE	SAFE	SAFE	SAFE	SAFE	SAFE	SAFE	SAFE	SAFE	SAFE	SAFE				

=== Photo shoot guide ===
- Episode 2 photo shoot: Glamour shots smoking/detriments of smoking
- Episode 3 photo shoot: Couture Rock Climbing
- Episode 4 photo shoot: Flowers & plant life
- Episode 5 photo shoot: Fashion gargoyles on top of building
- Episode 6 photo shoot: Eco-friendly fashion portraying recyclable materials
- Episode 8 music video: Enrique Iglesias, "Tired of Being Sorry"
- Episode 9 photo shoot: Stranded in the desert
- Episode 10 commercial & photo shoot: CoverGirl queen collection ad & commercial
- Episode 11 photo shoot: Chinese princesses / lion & dragon dance
- Episode 12 photo shoot: Great Wall of China warriors/Group shot
- Episode 13 Commercial & photo shoot: CoverGirl wetslicks fruit spritzers commercial & print ad; Seventeen magazine covers

=== Other cast members ===
- Jay Manuel – Photo Director
- Sutan – Make-up Artist
- Christian Marc – Hair Stylist
- Anda & Masha – Wardrobe
- Ann Shoket

=== Makeovers ===
- Victoria - Blonde highlights
- Janet - Dyed black
- Ebony - Naomi Campbell inspired long black weave
- Sarah - Cut short with blonde highlights and eyebrows lightened
- Ambreal - Pixie cut and dyed black
- Lisa - Cut short and dyed light brown
- Heather - Trimmed with chestnut brown highlights
- Bianca - Buzz cut (due to long golden blonde weave being unable to work)
- Jenah - Long ice blonde extensions
- Chantal - Long platinum blonde extensions with bangs
- Saleisha - Louise Brooks inspired bob cut with bangs

== Post-Top Model careers ==
- Mila Bouzinova did some test shots, did some print work for Cosmopolitan and used to be signed with Basic Model Management in New York.
- Kimberly Leemans signed with Elite Model Management in Chicago, after winning Elite Chicago's E-Tube's contest. She used to be signed with Basic Model Management in New York and International Model Management in Brussels. She was one of the models in the finale of season 6 of Project Runway. After ANTM, Kimberly decided to pursue her career in acting by moving to New York City. After earning her SAG card, Kimberly worked on television shows: Gossip Girl: Life on Mars: Cupid; Law and Order, and HBO's "How to Make It in America." She was also in the campaign model for "Palmers Hair Shampoo" and has been on several Florida magazine covers, Ocala, Cosmopolitan, and Unvogue. Kimberly is a very passionate animal activist and has been a vegetarian for several years. She is a major supporter and personally involved in the animal rights movement.
- Victoria Marshman has returned to Yale University and started to finish her Medieval History course.
- Janet Mills signed with Level Model and Talent Management.
- Ebony Morgan has gone back to dental school and was seen in Tyra's Fiercee Awards on The Tyra Banks Show as one of the nominated models.
- Sarah Hartshorne became an extremely successful writer, comedian, and content creator, best known for "Neither of Those Things. She was the plus-size contestant on Cycle 9 of America’s Next Top Model. After ANTM, Sarah modeled all over the world for clients like Glamour, Vogue, Skechers, and more. Sarah was also the "before" in a Weight Watchers commercial, and modeled plus-size costumes in New Jersey. She's written about her experiences with plus-size modeling, travel, body image and more for the Guardian, Bustle, Self and GoNomad. Since “retiring” from modeling she's performed standup all over New York and the country, as well as the Edinburgh Fringe Festival. She's also part of the Feminist Buzzkills of Comedy Tour with Abortion Access Front, where she is currently a staff writer. You may see her on Netflix's ‘Explained’ and HBO's ‘Vice’.
- Ambreal Williams signed with Click Model Management in Los Angeles. Ambreal became a successful model for clients such as Trina Turk, Estee’ Lauder Cosmetics, and represented Apple Inc. for store advertisement and products. In 2019, she hosted Santa Fe Fashion Week. While still modeling and teaching modeling classes, Ambreal moonlights as a professional massage therapist. She enjoys sharing knowledge, music, life, and of course, modeling.
- Lisa Jackson is currently signed with Major Model Management in New York, Studio Model Management in Paris and Muse Model Management in New York. She was one of the models in the finale of sixth season and was the model for designer Michelle Lesniak Franklin, Season 11, of Project Runway and walked for TRESemme at Mara Hoffman Spring 2010 show amongst many other shows. She has also modeled for Source, Carmen Marc Valvo and numerous brands and magazines. She has also been featured twice in Top Models In Action, the first time in Cycle 11, and the second in Cycle 13. She has appeared in the music video for Sean Paul's "She Doesn't Mind". Lisa also was the winning model on season 11 of Project Runway, winning $25,000 and the cover of Marie Claire. Since ANTN, Lisa is still an active, successful model. Lisa has appeared in international editions of Marie Claire, Harper's Bazaar, and La Femme. She worked with designers, Oscar de la Renta, Estee Lauder, Lanvin, and Loccitane. In between modeling and traveling, Lisa studies luxury interior decorating, plays the piano, and stays active with bike riding, boxing, and yoga. Lisa is of Jamaican-German descent.
- Heather Kuzmich signed with Elite Model Management in Chicago and Hong Kong. She did a photoshoot for the July 2008 issue of Wedding Essentials. She has modeled for the clothing company "Blue Eyed Girl". She has appeared on the cover and inside of Spectrum Magazine, a magazine for families and individuals who have autism. Kuzmich also appeared on 'Top Models in Action' on cycle 12. Since 2008, she graduated from the Illinois institute of Art in Chicago, with a bachelor's degree in 3D Art and Video Game Design. As of 2023, Heather is the Vice President of Corporate Development at Yep Nation, Inc., a major multi-media company. She is both traditionally and self-taught in 2D and 3D design. and experienced in digital and traditional mediums, skilled in human and animal anatomy, as well as fictional creatures.
- Bianca Golden is currently signed with Major Model Management in New York, Fusion Model Management in South Africa, Ford Models in Chicago and Click Models in Boston. She was one of the models in the finale of fifth season of Project Runway. She has modeled in Essence, Cosmopolitan, The Source and for various brands. She has also taken part in Farah Angsana Spring 2010 presentation as well as multiple fashion weeks and BET's Rip the Runway shows. Bianca has also appeared on The Tyra Banks Show several times. She also participated the all-star version of America's Next Top Model along with other returning models, and was eliminated in episode 7 alongside fellow contestant Kayla Ferrel. Bianca retired from modeling and started a ministry at her church for young women. She graduated from Lincoln University and teaches school in New York. In July 2022, Bianca married her partner of 13 years, Shawn Harris, in Cancun Mexico.
- Jenah Doucette has done some test shots and print work and was featured as one of the presenter in Tyra's Fiercee Awards on The Tyra Banks Show in 2008. As of 2015, Jenah is an executive assistant and therapist in Los Angeles, CA.
- Chantal Jones is signed with Nous Model Management, LA Models, Paragon Model Management in Mexico, and Synergy in Hong Kong. She appeared in a Black Eyed Peas music video and several runway shows, including for Oscar de la Renta. Chantal shot a commercial for AG+, a Shiseido deodorant. As of January 2023, she focuses on raising her family and hosts her own podcast called "Tough as a Mother." Her name is now Chantal Jones-Griffiths.
- Saleisha Stowers is currently signed with Elite Model Management in New York and Los Angeles and with L.A. Model Management. In 2013, she joined the cast of the online revival of All My Children, and in 2015, joined the cast of Days of Our Lives.
