= Heather Kuzmich =

American fashion model

- Born: Valparaiso, Indiana, U.S.
- Modeling information
- Height: 6 ft 0 in (1.83 m)
- Hair color: Brown
- Eye color: Green
- Agency: Elite Model Management

Heather Kuzmich is an American fashion model. She was a contestant on America's Next Top Model, Cycle 9, in which she was one of the top five competitors. During the show, it was revealed that Kuzmich has Asperger syndrome.

== Early life and education ==
Kuzmich is from Valparaiso, Indiana. During her childhood, she was teased for some of her behavior and not invited to many social events. Kuzmich was diagnosed with Asperger syndrome when she was fifteen years old, around the time her father died. Kuzmich graduated from Valparaiso High School in 2005.

While she was a student at the Illinois Institute of Art in Chicago, she participated in Season 9 of America's Next Top Model. According to Kuzmich, she has always wanted to model. Initially, she was hesitant about trying out for the show but finally agreed to do it after a friend convinced her to watch Cycle 7.

== Participation in America's Next Top Model ==
Early scenes from the show included some competitors loudly whispering about Kuzmich, criticizing her, and laughing at her. According to Marie-Agnès Parmentier and Eileen Fischer in the Journal of Consumer Research, she was an example of the "underdog character type." However, Kuzmich later said that "they didn't make fun of me that much" and that the show did not broadcast more "civilized" exchanges.

As the show progressed, "the on-set attitude" toward Kuzmich "softened", according to People. During the show, while filming a commercial, she "flubbed her lines", and later got "hopelessly lost" in Shanghai during an episode where she was expected to meet with five designers and managed to only meet with one, according to the New York Times.

Kuzmich became one of the top five contestants on America's Next Top Model, Cycle 9 and was the viewer favorite for eight weeks. According to the New York Times, during the show, Tyra Banks, Twiggy and Nigel Barker "marvel" at Kuzmich's "ability to connect with the camera", and she was selected by Enrique Iglesias for a featured role in a music video. She also won a photo shoot by Matthew Rolston to be directed by Mary J. Blige.

Kuzmich won nine CoverGirl of the Week awards, including one after she was eliminated.

== After America's Next Top Model ==
During the show, Kuzmich was not allowed to give interviews until after the show finale. Afterwards, she appeared on Good Morning America and Access Hollywood, and gave an interview to People.

=== Modeling career ===
Kuzmich signed to the women's division of Elite Model Management in Chicago and Hong Kong. A challenge win during Top Model allowed Kuzmich to participate in a special photoshoot art-directed by Mary J. Blige for Carol's Daughter. Kuzmich also did a photoshoot for the July 2008 issue of Wedding Essentials. Kuzmich has modeled for the clothing company "Blue Eyed Girl". She has also appeared on the cover and inside of Spectrum Magazine, a magazine for families and individuals who have autism. She also appeared on 'Top Models in Action' of ANTM cycle 12. The short clip featured her photo shoots including the cover of Spectrum magazine.

In 2008, she was one of the nine women featured in America's Next Top Model: Exposed on the CW. She has also appeared twice on The Tyra Banks Show, once in a "Where are they now?" episode and for the Fiercee awards.
