= Jaslene Gonzalez =

Puerto Rican model

Jaslene González
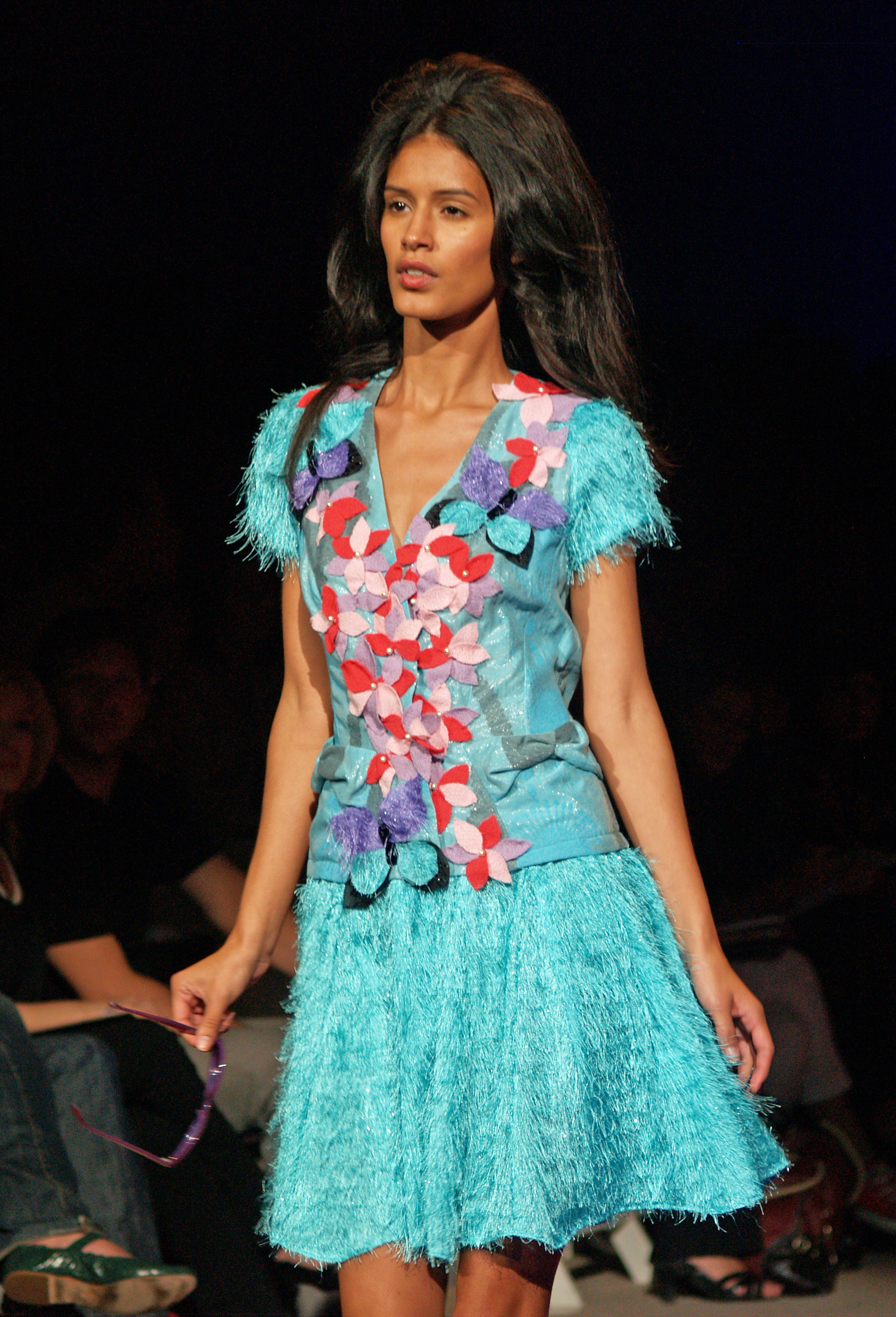
- Gonzalez on the runway for Custo Barcelona Spring/Summer 09
- Born: Jaslene Marie González; May 29, 1986 (age 40); Bayamón, Puerto Rico
- Modeling information
- Height: 5 ft 9 in (1.75 m)
- Hair color: Black
- Eye color: Brown
- Agency: State Management (New York City); Wallflower Management (Dallas, Austin); DDO Artists Agency (Chicago)

Jaslene Marie González (born May 29, 1986) is a Puerto Rican model, television host, and winner of Cycle 8 of America's Next Top Model.

== Biography ==
Gonzalez was born in Bayamón, Puerto Rico and grew up in Humboldt Park, Chicago. She attended Notre Dame High School for Girls on the Northwest Side of Chicago. She was an online college admissions advisor prior to America's Next Top Model.

Gonzalez had done some modeling prior to America's Next Top Model, having been represented by Avant Garde Models. In her CW "Close-up" interview, it was revealed that she appeared in fashion shows for local Chicago designers, including Michelle Gomez of Chicago and Alexis Arquette, as seen in local Chicago newspapers Extra and La Nota.

Gonzalez said in her Seventeen interview that she had been in an abusive relationship with her ex-boyfriend; the relationship ended shortly before the filming of cycle 7.

== America's Next Top Model ==
=== America's Next Top Model Cycle 7 ===
Gonzalez initially auditioned for Cycle 7, but only made it to the top 21 during the bootcamp. Assuring the judges that she would be back for the next cycle's audition, Gonzalez's determination caught the eyes of producers, who thought she had potential.

=== Winning America's Next Top Model Cycle 8 ===
Gonzalez re-auditioned for Cycle 8 and this time made it to the top thirteen, being the twelfth contestant selected (just before Diana Zalewski filled the final place). During the competition, Gonzalez was called first at panel four times, received four Covergirl of the Week awards, and won the Go-Sees reward challenge in Sydney where she chose fellow contestant, Dionne Walters to participate with her in the challenge prize. She was also the second contestant after Cycle 6 runner-up Joanie Dodds and the first winner to never appear in the bottom two. On the season finale, Gonzalez was revealed as the winner. She is the first contestant in the show's history to compete on more than one cycle and win, followed by former Cycle 5 eighth eliminated contestant, Lisa D'Amato of Cycle 17: All Stars. Gonzalez is the second of three winners from Illinois, preceded by Adrianne Curry of Cycle 1, and followed by McKey Sullivan of Cycle 11. Natasha Galkina was the runner-up upon Gonzalez's win.

=== America's Next Top Model Cycle 9 ===
Gonzalez appeared in the first episode of Cycle 9 at St. John’s where the 33 potential contestants met her before preparing for a beach photoshoot.

Gonzalez also appeared in the final episode to assist the top three contestants (Chantal Jones, Jenah Doucette and Saleisha Stowers) with their CoverGirl Wetslicks Fruit Spritzers commercial and photoshoot.

After Doucette was eliminated, the remaining two contestants Jones and Stowers participated in the final runway modeling Qi Gang's line of couture dresses with Gonzalez opening the show.

=== America's Next Top Model Cycle 10 ===
Gonzalez appeared in a Cycle 10 episode posing in a Lot 29 photoshoot in Seventeen magazine with challenge winner Katarzyna Dolinska along with fellow contestants chosen to participate, Amis Jenkins and Marvita Washington.

Gonzalez was also present for the 7 Up party where the top seven contestants had to work a "green" carpet leading to eventual runner-up Anya Kop winning the challenge where her prize was another nude photoshoot for 7 Up and US$10,000 as payment.

=== America's Next Top Model Cycle 11 ===
Gonzalez appeared in a Top Models in Action segment during an episode of Cycle 11.

== Modeling career ==
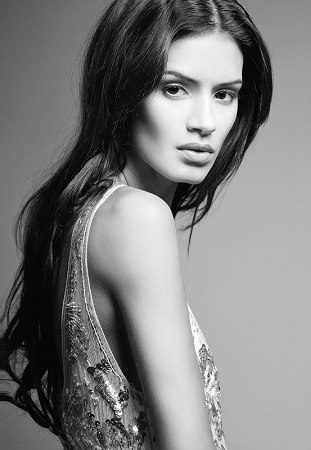
González in 2007.

After the show, she has modeled in New York, California, Florida, Texas and Illinois, while international in Mexico, South Africa, Malaysia, Thailand and India.

=== Print work ===
Gonzalez has modeled for the New York Post (Tempo), US Weekly,In Touch Weekly, had a 6-page spread in an issue of Vibe Vixen magazine, a 12-page fashion spread for ZooZoom Magazine. Named One Of Latina Magazine's Latinas Of the Year, had a 9-page spread for Colures (U.K fashion Magazine), was featured in Trace (magazine): Model Behaviour as Falls new faces, has been on the covers and had spreads of over a dozen magazines such as Latina, Imagén, Hombre, 6 Degrees, FN, ZooZoom, Fashion Salon Seventeen, Urban Latino, Bleu, Vanidades, Scene, JamRock, Splendor, Time Out. and Metrostyle Catalog. She has also appeared in Lot29 Fall/Winter 07-08 and Spring/Summer 08 ad campaigns; she has had a total of four billboards in Times Square so far. Also, she shares one of her Lot29 billboards in Times Square, New York with Katarzyna Dolinska. Gonzalez shot an ad campaign for online retailer ShopBop, 8-page fashion spreads for both Scene Magazine and JamRock Magazine. She is also featured on the pages of Living Proof Magazine, American Salon Magazine and currently has an ad campaign with Marianne Stores. Gonzalez has had an Ad Campaign for designer Cesar Galindo's Spring 2008 Collection and appeared on the pages of Supermodels Unlimited Magazine twice for the August and September/October 2008 issues. Gonzalez is also part of the "Heart On My Sleeve" clothing campaign by Aubrey O'Day. Gonzalez is on the pages of YRB Magazine. She has also been featured on COACD, fashionista.com and in Women's Wear Daily. Gonzalez currently has nationwide campaigns with Garnier Nutrisse, and Southpole. In addition, Kett Cosmetics, Marianne Stores F/W 09, and Recession Denim F/W 09 campaigns. She has also been on the cover Nuovo Magazine. She has been on the cover of Nylon Mexico. In India, she has been in Marie Claire (June 2012), New Woman and Grazia.

=== Runway ===
Gonzalez has modeled for Ximena Valero and James de Colón and was honored at the 1st Annual Chicago Latino Fashion Week. Gonzalez also walked for Ashley Paige in Mercedes Benz Fashion Week Miami Swim 08 and was on the catwalk for the Armani Exchange line. In addition she received a showcard from elite and walked at Mercedes-Benz New York Fashion Week Spring/Summer 2008. Gonzalez walked at Mercedes-Benz New York Fashion Week Fall/Winter 2008-09 for Armani Exchange and Project Runway finalist Jillian Lewis. She has modeled for the Amaya swimwear line at the BET 'Rip the Runway' fashion show. Gonzalez strutted on the catwalk of Mercedes-Benz New York Fashion Week Spring/Summer 2009 for designers Jose Duran, Indashio, Cesar Galindo, Farah Angsana and Custo Barcelona. Gonzalez was on the runway for Adolfo Sanchez S/S 09 collection and also on the runways at the 2nd Annual Chicago Latino Fashion Week for Elda De La Rosa, James De Colon, Nora Del Busto, and Soledad Designs S/S 09. Gonzalez modeled as Wonder Woman at the 11th Annual New York Chocolate Show, which benefited the Susan G. Komen breast cancer foundation. Gonzalez strutted on the catwalk of Mercedes-Benz New York Fashion Week Fall/Winter 2009 for Project Runway & Jordi Scott. She was also on the runways for Dana Maxx Fall 09, Design Cares Kaleidoscope Of Dreams For St. Jude Children's Hospital and Jenna Leigh Lingerie A/W 09.10. Maxis presents Malaysia International Fashion Week 2009. Gonzalez was also a featured model in the finale of Project Runway (season 6). She took part in the Sewing for Hope charity fashion show 2010. On September 12, 2011, Gonzalez was a featured model for designer, WALTER Spring 2012 Fashion Presentation at The Empire Hotel Rooftop Lounge during New York Fashion Week.

=== Miscellaneous ===
As part of her prize, Gonzalez won representation by Elite Model Management, a US$100,000 contract with CoverGirl cosmetics and a photo shoot for the cover of a six-page spread in Seventeen magazine. In addition, during the run of Cycle 9, Gonzalez appeared once a week in a "My Life As A CoverGirl" segment that aired during commercial breaks while the week's episode of Top Model runs. She has also been featured as one of Cycle 11's Top Models in Action.

She made appearances on talk shows Live With Regis and Kelly, 106 & Park, TRL, The View, modeling a dress designed by Elisabeth Hasselbeck and Jensen! (Dutch Talkshow).

She was "La Madrina" of the Annual National New York City Puerto Rican Day Parade held June 16, 2007, appearing in a yellow convertible that paraded alongside the car carrying Daddy Yankee.

Gonzalez hosted several style spots for CoverGirl TV, including segments titled "Summer Goddess", "Day To Night" and "Jaslene's Glamorous Nights". She was a nominee for the 2007 Teen Choice Awards, under the category "Choice TV: Female Reality/Variety Star".

Women's Wear Daily (WWD) said the following about Gonzalez:

When 20-year-old Jaslene Gonzalez won season eight's America's Next Top Model, Lot29 executives knew they had their next face.
They seem to have chosen correctly. Gonzalez did so well for the brand last season, the company asked her back to endorse the product for spring.

Gonzalez filmed her first official CoverGirl commercial, which aired in Europe, Latin America and on Spanish-language channels and has been featured on Teen Vogue. She shot a cameo in the John Leguizamo film Nothing Like the Holidays. In addition, Gonzalez has renewed her contract with CoverGirl and she has also been featured on CBS' The Early Show, where she discussed her career success. Gonzalez was also featured on Ryan Leslie's music video, "Addiction". Also, featured on Aventura's (Dominican Bachata band) latest music video "Por Un Segundo" and Magic Juan's music video "Baby Come Back".

Gonzalez partnered with Liz Claiborne and the National Domestic Violence Hotline to spread awareness about teen dating violence for the "Love Is Not Abuse" campaign. Gonzalez modeled a design from fashion house Nina Ricci on the Today Show with Kathie Lee Gifford and Hoda Kotb for a segment on Paws for Style. Gonzalez is currently signed with 301 Model Management Miami, Faces Model Management Malaysia, Exodus Model Management Thailand; she is currently working in Malaysia, Hong Kong, Thailand and Singapore. She was also a guest judge for Miss Malaysia World 2010.

Gonzalez hosts events on Spanish 'Yeah!' channel.

Gonzalez also appeared as the seizure girl on Chicago Fire, season 4; episode 11.

== Awards and nominations ==
Year	Award	Category	For:	Result
2007	Teen Choice Awards	Choice Female Reality/Variety TV Star	America's Next Top Model	Nominated

== See also ==
- List of Puerto Ricans

Preceded by CariDee English	America's Next Top Model winner Cycle 8 (2007)	Succeeded by Saleisha Stowers
