= Ximena Valero =

American Mexican born fashion designer (born 1977)

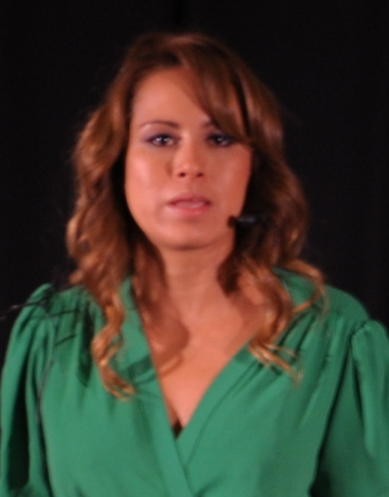
- Valero in 2014
- Born: Jimena del Carmen Valero Jarillo; May 26, 1977 (age 49); Mexico City, Distrito Federal, Mexico
- Occupation: Fashion Designer
- Website: www.ximenavalero.com

Ximena Valero (born Jimena del Carmen Valero Jarillo; May 26, 1977) is an American, Mexican born fashion designer and winner of the 2007 International Award for Designer of the Year for Excellence in Evening Wear at Miami's Fashion Week. She is known for introducing Transformable Fashion and has dressed a number of celebrities. Valero made her name in Tijuana and now lives in Los Angeles. She was recently (fall, 2016) featured as a designer and judge on The Fashion Hero.

== Early life and education ==
Ximena Valero was born Jimena del Carmen Valero Jarillo in Mexico City, Distrito Federal, Mexico to Carmen Jarillo-Yañez, a school teacher and housewife, and José L. Valero, M.D. a plastic surgeon. Ximena's parents moved to Tijuana, Mexico in 1982. She got her formal training at Fashion Institute of Design and Merchandising (FIDM) in San Diego.She started studying fashion during summer breaks at the age of 8. It was with her mother's influence that she began to study fashion and couture lessons. At which point, fashion design grew to be her passion, eventually leading her to become a student of fashion design at Fashion Institute of Design and Merchandising, in neighboring San Diego, at the age of 17.

== Career ==
She started designing women's apparel in her first workshop in Tijuana, in the late 1990s. In 1999, she was offered and accepted a paid internship in the design department at Victoria's Secret & Limited Brands by Victoria's Secret CEO Grace Nichols. After her internship ended she started working in New York as a free-lance fashion designer. In early 2006, she moved back to the Tijuana-San Diego area. During the following two years, she developed new designs incorporating Frida Kalhlo's look into her apparel creations and also designed women's shoes and pets apparel.

By late 2007, she moved to Los Angeles, where she has her current workshop and showroom studio. During 2007 and 2008, she has appeared in several Fashion Week shows around Latin America and the US, and was the winner of the 2007 International Award for Designer of the Year for Excellence in Evening Wear in 2007's Miami's Fashion Week. On October 14, 2008, she was appointed one of 15 members of 2008's Tijuana's Hall of Fame, at the Canaco (National Chamber of Commerce), selected by the Tijuana's Image Committee, headed by Tijuana's tycoon, José Galicot Behar.

== Transformable Fashion ==
Her major contribution to fashion in 2009 was so-called "Transformable Fashion," that is, women's apparel that can be worn in many different ways. On her innovation, she recalled, "I was running out of clothes. So I repurposed what we had. Then I thought, what if I made original designs with that transformability in mind?" Valero went on to design a long line of Transformable Fashion women's outfits that can be worn in multiple ways.

== Reality television ==
Ximena Valero was featured as a designer and judge on The Fashion Hero, hosted by Brooke Hogan. It is available on Amazon Prime. She has also been featured on a number of television and internet programs.

== Celebrities dressed ==
According to various online and print publications, Valero has dressed a number of high-profile celebrities in her career:

- Alicia Keys – Composer, Musician
- Katy Perry – Pop idol, Singer
- Jessica Alba – Actress
- Jessica Biel – Actress
- Lindsay Lohan – Actress
- Eva Longoria – Actress
- Daisy Fuentes – TV Host / Personality
- Ciara – Rapper, Singer
- Ariana Savalas – American Jazz Singer
- Paulina Rubio – Pop Singer
- Fernanda Romero – Actress
- Alejandra Guzman – Mexican Singer
- Lorena Rojas – Mexican Actress
- Daniela Kosan – E entertainment TV host
- Melanie Brown – Spice Girl
- Guadalupe Pineda – Mexican singer
- Patricia de Leon – Actress
- Diana Garcia – Mexican actress
- Leryn Franco – Olympic Javelin Thrower
- Cynthia Olavarria – Miss Universe First Runner Up
- Alejandra Espinoza – TV Host
- Barbara Mori – Actress
- Belinda – Pop Idol
- Ninel Conde – Singer/Actress
- Jaslene Gonzalez – American Next Top Model
- Solange Knowles – Singer
- Debbie Berebichez – Scientist
- Jackie Tohn – American actress
- Margherita Missoni – Designer for Missoni
- Zuleyka Rivera – Miss Universe
- Nadine Velazquez – Film Actress, Model
- Ana de la Reguera – Mexican Actress
- Katie Cassidy – American Actress
- Ximena Sarinana – Singer
- Barbara Islas – Mexican TV Host Actress
- Cari Lee – Painter and Socialite
- Janice Dickinson – Supermodel
- Heather Marks – Supermodel
- Melissa Haro – Supermodel
- Cintia Dicker – Supermodel
- Tiiu Tulk – Supermodel
- Juliana Imai – Supermodel
