= Whitney Thompson =

American plus-size model (born 1987)

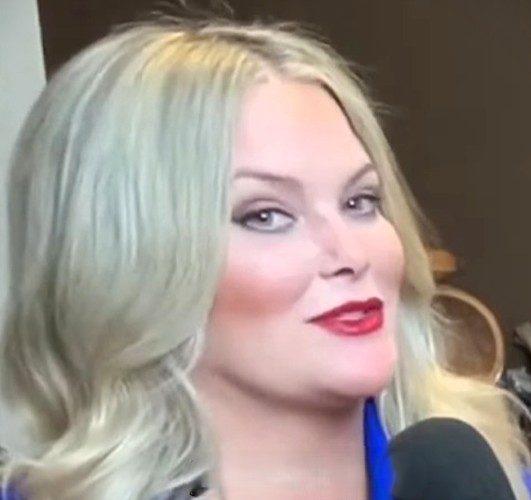
- Thompson in 2025
- Born: Whitney Lee Thompson; September 26, 1987 (age 39); Atlantic Beach, Florida, U.S.
- Occupation: Model
- Spouse: Ian Forrester (m. 2014)
- Modeling information
- Height: 5 ft 10 in (1.78 m)
- Hair color: Brunette
- Eye color: Green
- Agency: Elite Model Management; Wilhelmina Models

Whitney Lee Thompson Forrester (born September 26, 1987) is an American plus-size model and is the winner of the tenth cycle of America's Next Top Model.

== Early life ==
Before her appearance on the show, Thompson worked locally in northern Florida and appeared on the cover of Jacksonville Magazine three times. She attended Duncan U. Fletcher High School and the University of North Florida.

== America's Next Top Model ==
Thompson competed against 13 other contestants to win cycle 10 of America's Next Top Model. She was selected as one of the contestants to enter the Top Model house. Almost every judge, except for Tyra Banks, criticized her performances and personality as being "too pageant" and "fake", this came along by a CoverGirl commercial, Thompson landed in the bottom two with contestant Lauren Utter. Thompson received a first call-out during the music-themed photo shoot, and won one CoverGirl of the Week title, from the final photo-shoot challenge of cycle 10. She landed in the bottom two a total of four times, which makes her the winner with most bottom two appearances. Thompson competed in the finale against Anya Kop and won the title, making her the first plus-size model to win the show.

Although she is naturally a brunette, Thompson received blonde hair extensions for her makeover on the show. After the show, she changed her hair color to dark blonde.

The prize package included a contract with CoverGirl cosmetics and a contract with Elite Model Management. She also received the cover and six-page editorial spread in the July 2008 issue of Seventeen magazine. Thompson's CoverGirl contract includes a US national TV commercial, print advertising, and a billboard in Times Square.

== After America's Next Top Model ==
Thompson has been on the cover of Jacksonville Magazine August 2005, October 2005, March 2006, and August 2008, as well as Plus Model Magazine January 2010, Animal Fair Magazine, and Supermodels Unlimited, September/October 2008. She's also a spokesmodel for Smile Stylists, modeled for Metrostyle, JC Penney, People Magazine, Diana Warner Jewelry, Forever 21, Saks Fifth Avenue, the face for Torrid, Converse One Star, Fashion Bug, and a campaign with Pure Energy/Target, Fall 2010, and the face for Panache lingerie, Winter 2014.

She's also an ambassador for the National Eating Disorders Association, and a spokesperson for the Right Fit brand of Fashion Bug.

In December 2009/January 2010, Thompson was a model for the Faith 21 line by Forever 21.

== Other accomplishments ==
- Thompson was noted by Lifestyle MSN as one of the 'Most Influential Women of 2008'.
- In 2009, Thompson launched a jewelry and candle collection called "Supermodel."

| Preceded by Saleisha Stowers | America's Next Top Model winner Cycle 10 (2008) | Succeeded by McKey Sullivan |
