= Sal Stowers =

American actress and model (born 1986)

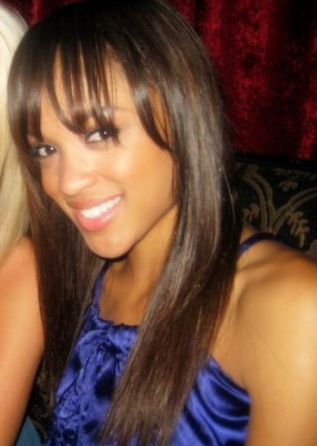
- Stowers in May 2008
- Born: Saleisha Lashawn Stowers; January 20, 1986 (age 40); Pasadena, California, U.S.
- Occupations: Actress; model
- Years active: 2006–present

Saleisha Lashawn Stowers (born January 20, 1986) is an American actress and model. She was cycle 9’s winner of America's Next Top Model. She portrayed the role of Lani Price on NBC's soap opera Days of Our Lives.

== Early life ==
Stowers was born in Pasadena, California. She was raised in Madera by her grandmother. At age 14, she attended Tyra Banks's "T-Zone" camp to help build her self esteem and confidence. She then moved to Los Angeles, where she worked as a receptionist before appearing on America's Next Top Model.

== Career ==
=== Modeling ===
Stowers was signed with Photogenics Model Management and had also appeared in a commercial for fast-food restaurant Wendy's, with actor Tom Lenk. She had modeled for DOMIJ clothing, and d.e.m.o. She was also an extra in an episode of the TV series Ugly Betty and on two episodes of the Tyra Banks Show, modeling for Rami, Project Runway season four contestant. Stowers appeared in the "Welcome Back" music video, and had an ad for 24 Hour Fitness. She also modeled for Especially Yours wigs, and was featured in a fashion spread for InTouch Weekly. She was recruited for the ninth cycle of America's Next Top Model, where she was the eighth contestant selected for the top thirteen. Over her stay, Stowers won three challenges, received two first call-outs and had two bottom two appearances where she survived both over Victoria Marshman and Jenah Doucette. She subsequently won the competition, beating runner up Chantal Jones in the final. She was signed with Elite Model Management.

Several blogs and news outlets have speculated that her past relationship with Banks (her participation in Banks' T-Zone camp and her past appearances on Tyra's television shows and her appearance as a model on The Tyra Banks Show and Cycle 6 of America's Next Top Model), may have influenced the selection of the winner. Stowers had also been a national spokesmodel for Especially Yours wigs for more than a year before the show ran, as well as appearing in an episode of the hit US sitcom Ugly Betty.

After Fatima Siad was eliminated, Stowers appeared in the season finale of Cycle 10 to participate in the final runway show with the final two models, Whitney Thompson and Anya Kop.

Stowers had a Metro Style campaign along with fellow Top Model alum winners, Dani Evans, Jaslene Gonzalez and Whitney Thompson from Cycles 6, 8 and 10, respectively. Stowers was on the cover of Seventeen as part of her prize. She has appeared on the cover of Paper Doll Magazine, had a cover and spread in Florida International Magazine and had spreads in the January 2008 issue of InTouch Weekly, OK! Magazine, the July 2008 issue of Essence Magazine, Jam Style. and had a four-page spread in an issue of Macy's. She has modeled for Gilt Groupe and Macy's catalogue online. She has also modeled for Dereon, Apple Bottoms, Baby Phat, and Love Tease for Macy's. Stowers had a campaign with Garage Clothing for their Spring 2009 line. She has also appeared in Modern Bride for the February/March 2009 issue.

Stowers had walked for Tibi in Mercedes-Benz Fashion Week Fall 2008, Peter Som's Bill Blass Fall 2008 Collection at Saks Fifth Avenue on April 2, 2008, Carson Kressley's Safilo USA Spring/Summer '08 Designer Eyewear Fashion Show at Vision Expo East on April 12, 2008, Jose Duran for NYC fashion week, which also showed on her My Life as CoverGirl commercials, a GenArt Fashion Show for Jennifer Mary, Billabong's 2nd Annual Design for Humanity fashion show in Los Angeles, and Pamella Roland at New York Fashion Week, and she opened for a mock Versace runway show. Stowers walked for Beach Bunny Swimwear and Lana Fuchs in Los Angeles Fashion Week Spring/Summer 2009. She also appeared on the Tyra Banks Show for the episode titled Tina Knowles modeling in a House of Dereon fashion show.

=== Acting ===
In 2013, Stowers was cast as the daughter of Angie Hubbard (Debbi Morgan), Cassandra Foster on the Prospect Park's continuation of All My Children, she made her debut on April 30, 2013.

In March 2015, Stowers guest starred on an episode of the ABC Family show, Switched at Birth as Tara. In June 2015, Stowers joined the cast of Days of Our Lives in the role of Lani Price. She made her first appearance on September 25, 2015. In the same year, she guest-starred in an episode of Major Crimes as Heather. In 2016, she recurred on Caged as Shawna Carlson. In 2017, she was cast in the lead role of Krista in a film called "Tomboy", as well as Josie Miller in the series "Beyond Therapy". In 2018, she guest-starred in an episode of The Fosters as Priya.

== Acting credits ==
Film
| Year | Title | Role | Notes |
|---|---|---|---|
| 2006 | Talking with the Taxman About Poetry | Steven's Girlfriend | |
| 2013 | Jaded the Series | Jade | Short film |
| 2017 | Tomboy | Krista | Lead role |

Television
| Year | Title | Role | Notes |
|---|---|---|---|
| 2006 | Ugly Betty | Girl and model in elevator | 2 episodes |
| 2012 | The Exes | Model | 1 episode |
| 2012 | Mr. Box Office | Johari Jones | 1 episode |
| 2013 | New Girl | Yeah, Yeah, Yeah Girl | 1 episode |
| 2013 | All My Children | Cassandra Foster | 42 episodes |
| 2015 | Switched at Birth | Tara | 1 episode |
| 2015 | Major Crimes | Heather | 1 episode |
| 2015–present | Days of Our Lives | Lani Price | Series regular (2015–2022), recurring (2023–present) |
| 2016 | Caged | Shawna Carlson | 5 episodes |
| 2017 | Michael Bolton's Big, Sexy Valentine's Day Special | Virtual Pharmacist | Variety special |
| 2018 | The Fosters | Priya | 1 episode |
| 2021 | Days of Our Lives: Beyond Salem | Lani Price | Miniseries |

| Preceded by Jaslene Gonzalez | America's Next Top Model winner Cycle 9 (2007) | Succeeded by Whitney Thompson |
