= Jacksonville Magazine =

Magazine

- Publisher/Editor-in-Chief: Joe White
- Frequency: Monthly
- Circulation: 22,000
- Founded: 1983
- Company: White Publishing Company
- Based in: Jacksonville, Florida
- Website: www.jacksonvillemag.com

Jacksonville Magazine is a monthly magazine published in Jacksonville, Florida. Founded in 1983, it is a regional lifestyle and general interest magazine covering Northeast Florida. In addition to the flagship magazine, Jacksonville Magazine also publishes several supplemental publications.

== History ==
The magazine was founded in 1983 as Jacksonville Today with the goal of creating a new lifestyle magazine for the Jacksonville area. White Publishing, founded by James L. White III, became the publisher in 1984. The magazine established itself with aggressive growth and a wide-ranging distribution network across Northeast Florida as far as Ocala. It out-competed an earlier publication named Jacksonville Magazine, and later adopted the name. Joseph White became publisher in 1999.

Like other similar regional publication, Jacksonville Magazine grew by partnering with local hotels, real estate firms, and the Chamber of Commerce to provide a distribution stream. It was also sold at White's Books, an independent bookstore chain also owned by White Publishing. These avenues enabled steady growth, although the magazine also maintained a sizable subscriber base. As of 2016, it has a monthly circulation of 22,000, including 11,000 subscriptions.

== Format and publications ==
Jacksonville Magazine, the flagship publication, is a monthly lifestyle magazine dedicated to Jacksonville and Northeast Florida. Issues contain feature stories, interviews, restaurant and entertainment reviews, and lifestyle stories about the region. In the 1990s Jacksonville Magazine began releasing periodic supplemental publications with various focuses in addition to the flagship Jacksonville Magazine. As of 2016, its supplements are Your Health, 904, Taste, Bride, Home, and the Ultimate Guide. The company also published a coffee table book, Beautiful Homes of Jacksonville, and a Jacksonville visitors' guide.
