= Tokion =

Japanese Fashion Magazine

- Categories: Visual arts Performing arts
- Founder: Lucas Badtke-Berkow; Adam Glickman
- Founded: 1996
- Country: Japan; United States
- Language: English

Tokion is a Japanese-based magazine covering art, fashion, music and film first published in Japan in 1996, followed by United States, UK, and Hong Kong editions. The magazine's makers also produced the annual Creativity Now Conference, a weekend-long seminar of panel discussions with speakers from across the creative spectrum.

== History ==
The magazine was started in 1996 by Lucas Badtke-Berkow and Adam Glickman, two American expatriates living in Japan, as a cultural bridge between Japan and the United States. In 1998, Tokion opened an American office in Los Angeles. In 2000 it moved into a retail space/office in New York City, while maintaining a retail space/office in Tokyo. While in New York, the magazine's focus shifted from Japanese-influenced content to street culture aesthetics and then to a more global arts magazine featuring interviews with recognized artists such as Lou Reed, Richard Prince, James Brown, Francesco Clemente, Roger Corman, Ed Ruscha and Jeff Koons, while continuing to cover up-and-coming artists such as Harmony Korine, Miranda July, Cory Arcangel and Simone Shubuck.

In 2002, Badtke-Berkow sold his share in the magazine to Glickman. Badtke-Berkow began publishing Papersky and Mammoth magazines in Japan, while Glickman began publishing Japanese and US editions. In 2005, the Japanese edition was sold to Infas Publishing Company. In 2006, the American edition was sold to independent publisher Larry Rosenblum. In 2009, Tokion and Creativity Now were sold out of foreclosure to Donald Hellinger, president of Nylon Holding, Inc. In 2010 the magazine was renamed Factory in the US.
