= Tarina Tarantino =

American jewelry designer

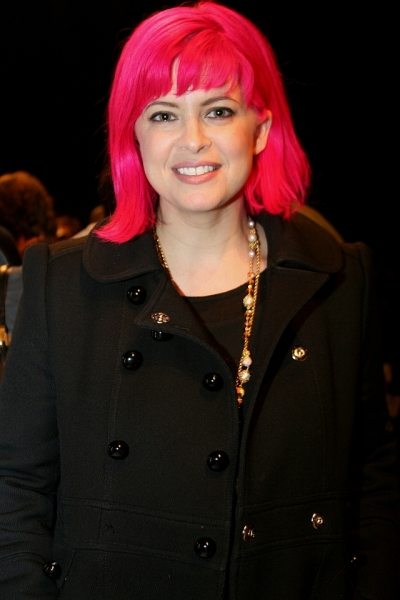
- Tarantino at Mercedes Benz Fashion Week, 2007
- Born: 1969 (age 56–57)
- Occupation: Jewelry designer

Tarina Tarantino is an American costume jewelry and accessory designer, based in Los Angeles, California. Known for her flamboyant pink hair, she has been described as having "a pretty cult-like following here in LA" and as "the haute designer of playful jewelry for grown women".

== Early years and education ==
Born in 1969, as a child in Los Angeles she began making jewelry at age 3, out of plastic and other materials, and as an adult she continued designing jewelry as a hobby. After graduating from high school, Tarantino moved to Paris, where she worked as a fashion model.

== Career ==
Having worked as a fashion model, she grew tired of "starving herself to stay thin." Returning to Los Angeles, she became a full-time makeup artist. She often wore her self-designed jewelry pieces and found that people bought them right off her body.

== Tarina Tarantino (company) ==
In 1995, she and Alfonso Campos opened the eponymous design business Tarina Tarantino. Her jewelry and other creations are assembled in Downtown Los Angeles, and she has a boutique store on Melrose Avenue. She also has stores in New York City and Milan.

Her jewelry pieces are expensive and heavy-weight, often made from Lucite or Swarovski crystals. She launches 15 new collections a year, often featuring designs inspired by cultural icons like Alice in Wonderland and The Wizard of Oz. She has produced two collections in collaboration with Mattel based on the iconic Barbie doll, noting that "Barbie has been every designer's inspiration." She also produces jewelry in collaboration with Hello Kitty.

She is primarily known as a designer of costume jewelry, but she also designs handbags and other accessories, and she released a full collection of cosmetics exclusively for Sephora retail stores in January 2010.

In 2010 Tarantino teamed up with the makeup retail Sephora to launch a fairy and princess inspired collection.

== Filmography ==
In 2003 and 2008 Tarantino was involved in America’s Next Top Model by creating designs for the models.

In 2015 Tarantino was executive producer of Velvet Karma. The movie was written and directed by her husband Alfonso Campos and received an award by the Official Selection International Fashion Film Awards 2015 for Global Excellence.

== Private life ==
She lives in Los Angeles and is the mother of two daughters. She has been married to Alfonso Campos since 1999.
