= Southpole (clothing) =

American wholesale clothing company

SOUTHPOLE
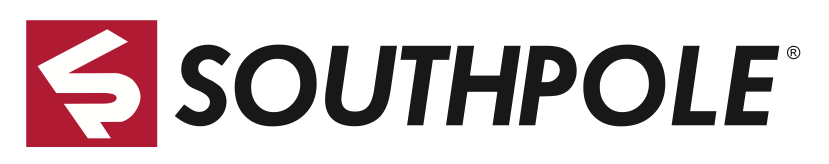
- Company type: Private
- Industry: Wholesale, Fashion, Apparel, Sunglasses, Footwear
- Founded: 1991
- Founder: David Khym, Kenny Khym
- Headquarters: Fort Lee, Bergen County, New Jersey, United States
- Area served: Worldwide
- Key people: David Khym (Chairman) Kenny Khym (President & CEO)
- Revenue: $1 billion+
- Number of employees: 100–500 (2016)
- Parent: Wicked Fashions Inc.(1991–present)
- Website: www.southpole-usa.com

Southpole is an American wholesale clothing and fashion company, designer, distributor, licensor, and marketer based in Fort Lee, New Jersey, with operating headquarters in New York City. The company was founded in 1991 by two Korean American brothers, David Khym and Kenny Khym under their company name, Wicked Fashions Inc. The company's showroom is located on Fashion Avenue in Manhattan.

== History ==
David and Kenny Khym hail from a family of five children who immigrated to the United States from Incheon, South Korea in 1977. In 1981, David used $10,000 in savings and a $5,000 line of credit to establish a retail clothing store in the Brownsville section of Brooklyn. He hired Kenny to work at the store, and in 1989 they relocated to Jamaica, Queens after their landlord for the Brownsville location raised their rent.

The Khyms had trouble keeping the baggy urban fashions popular at the Jamaica location in stock, so in 1991 they established a wholesale company called Wicked Fashions to import clothes from Pakistan. David Khym named the new clothing label Southpole in honor of a team of Korean explorers who had recently become the first from that country to reach the South Pole. Southpole succeeded by providing styles similar to those of other popular urban labels such as FUBU, but at a much lower cost.

In 1996, Kenny founded his own business, Against All Odds, a chain of mall-based retail stores focusing on urban street fashion.

Today, Southpole clothes are imported from manufacturers in Bangladesh, Pakistan, China, India, and Vietnam, then sold through both national and e-commerce retailers such as Amazon, Eastbay, Foot Locker, J.C. Penney, Sears, Dr. Jays and Burlington Coat Factory. Southpole generated more than $350 million in sales in 2005.

== Products ==
Products include jeans, shorts, shirt, T-shirts, sweatshirts, joggers, jackets, footwear, accessories and “big and tall” to “boys” range.

== Company’s Brand Labels ==
Lot29® brand is launched using licensed cartoon characters like Looney Tunes in 2002. The White Tag® brand and A. Prodigee® brand are launched in 2008. In Spring 2014, the company launches a new line, SP Active® for everyday basic, active wear such as fleece jogger pants and basketball shorts. In February 2016, the company introduces Southpole Antarctic Expedition® Outerwear Collection.

== Awards and records ==
In 2002, Southpole is awarded the J.C. Penney Divisional Award for Men's Apparel. When Southpole's junior line is launched in 2003, the brand is awarded the J.C. Penney Divisional Award for Women's Apparel. In 2010, Southpole is the fifth-largest denim brand in the U.S. behind Levi's, Wrangler, Lee and Calvin Klein, according to NPD Group figures.
