= Ann Shoket =

American magazine writer and editor

Ann Shoket is an American magazine writer and editor. She is the author of The Big Life and the former editor-in-chief of Seventeen magazine.

== Education ==
Shoket received her BA from New York University.

== Career ==
She is the author of The Big Life: Embrace the Mess, Work Your Side Hustle, Find a Monumental Relationship, and Become the Badass Babe You Were Meant to Be. She was editor-in-chief of Seventeen from 2007-2014. She began her career as a reporter at Steven Brill's The American Lawyer, then created the webzine Tag, an online community of artists and writers. Shoket was also senior editor with the Parade family of publications, and executive editor of CosmoGIRL! magazine. While at CosmoGIRL! she created a "CosmoGIRL! Born to Lead" patch program with The Girl Scouts and she developed a national leadership campaign with The White House Project with the goal of putting a reader in the White House by the year 2024.

She has also appeared in several episodes of the reality show series America's Next Top Model as a judge.
