= Carol's Daughter =

American beauty brand

- Product type: Hair care
- Current owner: L'Oreal USA
- Country: United States
- Introduced: May 1993; 33 years ago

Carol's Daughter is an American multi-cultural beauty brand headquartered in New York City.

Its founder and president, Lisa Price, established the brand in May 1993 in Brooklyn, New York City. The brand was named after Lisa Price's mother, Carol. The beauty brand offers a range of hair, body, and skincare products.

In October 2014, the brand was acquired by L'Oréal USA.

On March 3, 2025, L’Oréal USA announced it will sell the company to a partnership. Lisa Price, the founder will hold the President role in the new partnership .

== History ==
Price started the brand as a "side hustle" from her kitchen table in Brooklyn, New York City in the late 1980s. It initially started as a hobby while she was working full-time in television production, notably on "The Cosby Show" and its spin-off "Here and Now". She first began experimenting with fragrances and essential oils, which grew into an exploration of body care products. After gifting the homemade products to friends and family, her mother, Carol, implored her to start a business. Her mother died in 2003.

In 1993, Price began selling her products through word-of-mouth in her Bedford–Stuyvesant neighborhood of Brooklyn, and at local flea markets and craft fairs, building-up a loyal, devoted customer base. The first Carol's Daughter boutique opened in Fort Greene, Brooklyn in 1999. In 2000, the brand launched its e-commerce website. In 2002, Price was featured on the Oprah Winfrey Show, which gave her brand an enormous "Oprah Effect" boost. In 2005, Will Smith, Jada Pinkett Smith, and Jay-Z were among a group of movie and music stars who invested US$10 million into Price's brand to help expand its nationwide reach. Other investors included record executive Steve Stoute, investor Andrew Farkas, Interscope Records chief Jimmy Iovine, and music executive Tommy Mottola and his wife, singer Thalía.

In 2008, Carol's Daughter launched on HSN. In 2010, HSN partnered with Mary J. Blige and Carol's Daughter for an exclusive, inaugural fragrance called "My Life", which rolled-out with an eau de parfum in a limited edition gold clutch, a shower cream, a body lotion, and an eau de parfum rollerpen.

In March 2014, Carol's Daughter launched an exclusive collection with Target.

In April 2014, the brand filed for Chapter 11 bankruptcy protection with the Manhattan bankruptcy court. The brand's chief financial officer, John D. Elmer, stated that most of Carol's Daughter stores had been unprofitable since 2010. Before filing papers, the company closed five of its seven retail stores, and terminated 29 of its 42 employees.

Six months later, in October 2014, Carol's Daughter was acquired by L'Oréal USA.

Price's story is frequently cited as an example of the entrepreneurial success story of a "minority-owned business that caters primarily to women of color".
