= Benny Ninja =

American dancer

- Born: Benjamin Thomas
- Occupations: Vogue-style dancer, vogue teacher at Broadway Dance Center
- Known for: Father of the House of Ninja, a post given to him by Willi Ninja of Paris is Burning fame

Benny Ninja (né Benjamin Thomas) is a self-taught Vogue-style dancer from the underground clubs based in Westchester, New York. He is best known for his involvement in ball culture. He is the father of the House of Ninja, a post given to him by the late Willi Ninja of Paris is Burning fame.

In his dance, Ninja incorporates aspects of martial arts, gymnastics, house dancing, and yoga. He has performed throughout the United States and Europe.

Ninja is a vogue teacher at the Broadway Dance Center in New York City. He is also the co-owner and master training instructor of the Benny Ninja Training Academy.

Ninja had a recurring guest role on America's Next Top Model from Cycle 8 until Cycle 13.

Ninja was involved in the Metro-North train derailment that took place on Sunday December 1, 2013. He survived the accident but was "emotionally shaken" and suffered "some injuries". Following his accident, Javier Ninja now occupies the role of "Father of the House of Ninja".
