= America's Next Top Model season 14 =

America's Next Top Model
- Season 14
- Judges: Tyra Banks; Nigel Barker; André Leon Talley
- No. of contestants: 13
- Winner: Krista White
- No. of episodes: 12 (Note: When first shown in the United States, Casting Week, weeks 1 and 2 were shown as a separate 90-minute two episodes during its initial run. In other countries, these competing weeks were aired separately in first three episodes (e.g., Casting Week shown in one hour episode) before airing to its original one-hour episode aired in the United States. As well as re-runs in cable television networks across the United States, making them a 13-episode cycle as the second episode during re-runs entitled "Makeover Madness".)

Release
- Original network: The CW
- Original release: March 10 – May 19, 2010

Additional information
- Filming dates: October 30 – December 15, 2009

Season chronology
- ← Previous; Season 13 Next → Season 15

America's Next Top Model's fourteenth cycle debuted on March 10, 2010, marking the eighth season on The CW. The first three seasons of America's Next Top Model, as well as seasons 10 and 12, were filmed in New York City; however, the series did not return to New York until cycle 23. The catchphrase for Cycle 14 is "Work It Out." The promo songs are "Watch Me Move" by Fefe Dobson and "Go Getta" by Stella Mwangi.

The prizes for this cycle continued to be a contract with Wilhelmina Models, as well as a fashion spread and cover in Seventeen magazine, not to mention a US$100,000 contract with CoverGirl Cosmetics.

J. Alexander was removed from his post as a judge and replaced by Vogue editor André Leon Talley. Though Alexander was removed as judge, he remained as runway coach. The international destinations during this cycle were Auckland and Queenstown, New Zealand. This is the show's second consecutive visit to Polynesia after Maui, Hawaii, in cycle 13.

The winner of the competition was 24-year old Krista White from Pine Bluff, Arkansas, with Raina Hein placing as the runner up.

== Season summary ==
In this cycle, a new rule was introduced where the first contestant called by the judging panel each week had their photo or commercial displayed as digital art in the models' house and automatically received the reward challenge prize for the following week, regardless of their performance in the actual challenge itself. If the same contestant also won the challenge, they could share the reward with others or receive additional prizes.

The "Top Models in Action" segment was replaced by "Top Model Lounge," featuring commentary from past contestants Bianca Golden and Laura Kirkpatrick from America's Next Top Model, Cycles 9 an 13 respectively. Both Golden and Kirkpatrick returned as All Star contestants in Cycle 17, alongside Angelea Preston from this cycle (originally a Cycle 12 semifinalist) and eleven other former participants who had not won their original Top Model Cycles.

This cycle reverted to the standard modeling industry height requirement of 5'7" or taller, differing from the previous cycle’s focus on shorter contestants.

== Contestants ==
(Ages stated are at start of contest)

Contestant	Age	Height	Hometown	Finish	Place
Gabrielle Kniery	18	5 ft 7.5 in (1.71 m)	St. Louis, Missouri	Episode 2	13
Naduah Rugely	22	5 ft 7 in (1.70 m)	San Diego, California	Episode 2	12
Ren Vokes	22	5 ft 9 in (1.75 m)	Dallas, Texas	Episode 3	11
Simone Lewis	19	5 ft 10 in (1.78 m)	Lenexa, Kansas	Episode 4	10
Tatianna Kern	21	5 ft 9 in (1.75 m)	Ewa Beach, Hawaii	Episode 5	9
Brenda Arens	23	5 ft 11 in (1.80 m)	Houston, Texas	Episode 6	8
Anslee Payne-Franklin	23	5 ft 9 in (1.75 m)	Dacula, Georgia	Episode 7	7
Alasia Ballard	18	5 ft 9 in (1.75 m)	Marietta, Georgia	Episode 8	6
Jessica Serfaty	18	5 ft 9.25 in (1.76 m)	Conway, Arkansas	Episode 9	5
Alexandra Underwood	21	5 ft 11.25 in (1.81 m)	Kerrville, Texas	Episode 10	4–3
Angelea Preston	23	5 ft 11 in (1.80 m)	Buffalo, New York	Episode 10	4–3
Raina Hein	22	5 ft 10 in (1.78 m)	Minnetonka, Minnesota	Episode 11	2
Krista White	24	5 ft 9.5 in (1.77 m)	Pine Bluff, Arkansas	Episode 11	1

== Episodes ==
No. overall	No. in season	Title	Original release date	US viewers (millions)
162	1	"Be My Friend, Tyra!"/"Makeover Madness"	March 10, 2010	3.96
The fourteenth season began with 32 contestants vying for 14 spots. The contestants were told that they would be creating social networking-style profiles on "MyFiercePage.com", which would feature their photos and a video showing their catwalk, with only a select number of models having their “friend requests” accepted by Tyra. The contestants received coaching on their runway walks and each met with Banks, Manuel, and Alexander. Angelea Preston, who had participated in the casting week during Cycle 12 but had not ultimately made the final cut, returned as a contestant. 20 contestants advanced with their friend requests still pending, while 12 hopefuls’ requests were declined. The contestants then participated in a photoshoot where they were asked to emulate current and past top model contestants, styling their own hair and makeup. Tatianna was castigated for electing to emulate an actress (Megan Fox) rather than a model. Alasia chose Naomi Campbell but struggled to emulate her. Alexandra drew on a large mole in an effort to resemble Cindy Crawford, drawing criticism from Manuel, but impressed him by posing well. Gabrielle impressed Mr. Jay with her knowledge of the industry, referencing Danish model Freja Beha Erichsen. The contestants were then whittled down to a final group. Tyra announced that she and the Jays had been looking for 14 contestants to join their network, but that they could only agree upon 12 to advance further. Once selected, Tyra revealed that the advancing contestants would travel to New York City and that they would meet a thirteenth contestant upon arriving. In New York, the contestants arrived at Madame Tussauds Wax Museum, where they met celebrity blogger Perez Hilton. Banks had made a deal with Hilton on her talk show that he would stop writing about the children of celebrities for six months in exchange for him getting to appear on Top Model. During their tour, they were introduced to the thirteenth contestant, Ren, who had been scouted by Tyra and the production staff. Tyra then surprised the contestants by announcing that they would be undergoing makeovers and sent them to Sally Hershberger’s salon. The contestants moved into their New York City loft, where needing to share space in the house and various contestants’ behavior caused disagreements to quickly break out. They were then taken to their first official photoshoot, shot by Jonathan Mannion, where it was revealed that each would be posing nude, aside from one article of clothing from Custo Barcelona selected from a single fully-dressed mannequin. At the first judging panel, Tyra revealed that André Leon Talley had joined the panel (replacing J. Alexander, who continued in his capacity as the contestants’ runway coach). Sally Hershberger was the guest judge. Praised for her creative posing, Jessica received the first call-out. The bottom two contestants were Gabrielle, who was criticized for having a "boring" and "cliché" photograph, and Alasia, whose photograph was received poorly by Banks, Barker, and Hershberger but highly complimented by Talley, who call it "bold" and stated that he would hang it "in [his] salon." In the end, his favorable opinion of Alasia's photo won over the other judges, and Gabrielle was sent home.: Featured photographer: Jonathan Mannion; Guest judge: Sally Hershberger; Special guests: Perez Hilton, Anastasia Soare, Joanna Konjevod
163	2	"Drecktitude!"	March 17, 2010	3.78
The contestants were shown relaxing in their loft, where interpersonal dynamics amongst the girls were starting to shift. The Tyra Mail arrived, hinting at a runway-oriented challenge. Miss J. coached the models on their runway pacing and how to take a coat off while walking. The girls were then brought to a busy Manhattan intersection where they were put through their paces while crossing the street. The next day, the models arrived at Surrogate's Courthouse in Lower Manhattan, where Alexander announced that they would be walking in a Rachel Roy fashion show with a particularly challenging runway design. Contestants descended a flight of stairs, then walked down the runway and back while two large pendulums suspended above the runway swung back and forth across their path, challenging the contestants to walk with perfect pacing in order to avoid making contact, before finally walking back up the stairs. The winner was Brenda; for her prizes, she received the dress that she had worn in the fashion show, as well as an appearance in an upcoming feature on Rachel Roy’s website. As she had received the first call-out at the last panel, Jessica also got to keep the dress she wore. The photoshoot had contestants doing close-up shots wearing a colorful fragrance spray, modeling through strong wind and water being directed at them. Raina’s photo was lauded, with Tyra calling her eyes “wolf-like”. Naduah and Ren were in the bottom two. The judges thought that Naduah’s in-person edge wasn’t coming through in her photos, while Ren was considered “unpredictable,” having produced a strong picture the week before while her beauty shot was deemed weak, with Barker remarking that it looked like an advertisement for an H1N1 (swine flu) vaccine. Ultimately, Ren’s name was called and Naduah was eliminated.: Featured photographer: Brian Edwards; Guest judge: Rachel Roy
164	3	"Let's Dance"	March 24, 2010	3.08
The girls rode a "Fab Bus" and received a surprise visit from cycle 3 contestant Toccara Jones, who put their fashion knowledge to the test. The Blue Team consisting of Alexandra, Angelea, Jessica, Krista, and Simone (together with Raina who joined them in their reward) won a US$500 BlueFly gift certificate and the opportunity to audition for BlueFly's Spring Collection. The BlueFly executives were most impressed by Simone's go-see and she won the campaign and a US$2,500 gift certificate. Meanwhile, the losing team (consisting of Alasia, Anslee, Brenda, Ren, and Tatianna) had to help take inventory in the BlueFly's website warehouse. This week's photoshoot drew its inspiration from various dance genres. Alasia excelled, while Anslee, Brenda, Ren, and Simone failed to find their rhythm. At the panel, Alasia's outfit was unanimously lambasted, but her photo received universal applause. Upon receiving critique, Ren expressed her unhappiness because of all the drama happening in the house. This, combined with her unsightly photograph, landed her in the bottom two with Brenda, who also had a weak photo and for still not embracing her makeover. Despite initially stating her desire to continue, Ren then revealed she wanted to check out from the competition because she just wanted to tell her mother what she felt about her. But this was not needed, as Tyra handed the last photo to Brenda, telling her that "another transformation" will take place.: Featured photographer: Cade Martin; Special guests: Toccara Jones, Sean Patterson, Melissa Payner, Camila Hori, Jacqueline Wahba, Urbi Medley, Troy Powell, Ryan Taniguchi, Vincent Oquendo, Stephanie Larosiliere
165	4	"America's Next Top Vampire"	March 31, 2010	3.18
Sally Hershberger visited the girls and revealed that the "transformation" that Tyra announced last week was that Sally was cutting Brenda's hair shorter, much to Brenda's dismay. The models were then taken to the Upright Citizens Brigade Theatre to learn about improv. They were each given a scenario and a respective emotion to carry out the action in. Back at the house, Brenda received an edgier 80s-inspired cut similar to a faux-hawk, which Brenda found difficult to adjust to. During the haircut, a majority of the girls watched in interest and while most of them felt pity for Brenda, Angelea found the whole thing amusing, especially when Sally Hershberger used intimidating-looking clippers on the sides Brenda's hair. The girls went to Times Square and received their challenge from the newest CoverGirl spokesmodel, Dania Ramirez, who instructed them to do voice-overs for a CoverGirl Clean commercial. None of the girls did well, except Tatianna, whose playful commercial allowed her personality to shine through, and she won a CoverGirl shoot for Seventeen Magazine and CoverGirl.com. The models posed as vampires in a bloody bathtub at the photo shoot. White-out contact lenses that they had to wear left them virtually blind. Although she found trouble and pain while putting on her lenses, Brenda did quite well at the shoot with her simple but haunting and sexy pose. The judges slated Anslee for giving excuses for her poor performances and in the end, it was Simone and Anslee who landed in the bottom two, but Simone's contrived posing in her photos sent her packing.: Featured photographer: Sarah Silver; Special guests: Dania Ramirez, JB Smoove, Sally Hershberger, CJ Richards, Rodney Groves, Eric Orlando, Frances Hathaway
166	5	"Smile and Pose"	April 7, 2010	3.17
The contestants received letters from home to cheer them up. The next day, they arrived at Roosevelt Island, where they were tasked to create chemistry between themselves and a male model, who turned out to be Nigel. Later, they met comedian Ross Mathews and their challenge required them to model with him and produce a good shot with only five frames. Jessica won and received a pair of US$6,500 JudeFrances diamond earrings, while Alasia (who had the best photo the previous week) received a $5000 ring. The photoshoot took place at New York's Garment District – Canal Street, Chinatown. The girls were dressed up ala fashion faux pas to raise awareness about the detriment of counterfeit fashion products. Jessica, Angelea, and Krista wowed Jay in their performance, while Alexandra's confidence took a beating when she received mediocre feedback. At judging, Jessica received the most praise, as the judges were extremely impressed with her creativity in producing a great shot. Nigel also commented that every single part of her shot absolutely told a story about fake, while Andre praised her ability to jump, strike various poses, and make her face look great at the same time. Other girls also got some praise, including Angelea, Krista, Anslee, Brenda, Alasia, and Raina. Alexandra's dour picture landed her in the bottom two along with Tatianna, whose film from week to week was deemed weak, which made it difficult for Tyra to choose the best photo (despite having at least one great photo to show at the panel). In the end, Tatianna was sent home due to her inability to consistently produce great photos without just lucking into them. This episode was dedicated to the memory of Alexander McQueen who died two months before this episode aired.: Featured photographer: D-Nice; Special guests: Ross Mathews, Ann Shoket, Eric Orlando, Vincent Oquendo, Pat Cleveland
167	6	"New York Women"	April 14, 2010	2.85
The contestants visited Ann Shoket at the Seventeen Magazine headquarters, and Alasia's insistence on taking a shower beforehand caused them to be late. Ann taught them about how to dress in order to flatter all kinds of body types. They were then given 5 minutes to dress themselves up, and as a surprise, all of them got to keep the outfits they chose. The next night, the contestants were invited to Tinsley Mortimer's launch party of her new line of handbags and were given the opportunity to mingle with the guests as well as to have some one-on-one time with Tinsley. Jessica's sunny personality and cute outfit impressed Tinsley the most and she won a photo shoot in Seventeen Magazine, which she shared with Brenda and Raina (since Jessica was the first call-out at the previous judging, she got to choose two people instead of one). The photoshoot took place in the subway and at Grand Central–42nd Street station, which was also their first CoverGirl assignment. The contestants had to portray different facets of New York women. At the panel, Angelea finally received the first call-out, after three-second call-outs. Krista and Anslee met with very positive reviews, while Alexandra and Raina were a bit criticized for playing safe. André harshly criticized Jessica's choice of shoes, and her combative responses displeased the judges. Alasia's bad photo and lack of focus and Brenda's lack of chemistry in front of the camera and looking old in her photos put them in the bottom two. In the end, a teary Alasia was saved again as Brenda was eliminated.: Featured photographer: Mike Ruiz; Special guests: Ann Shoket, Tinsley Mortimer, Nicole Fox, Vincent Oquendo
168	7	"Big Hair Day"	April 21, 2010	2.97
The contestants received a surprise visit from model Pat Cleveland and fashion designer Whitney Port, who dolled them up for a night out at Lucky Cheng's drag queen cabaret. There, they met Ms. J, who introduced them to their runway challenge. Krista's personality on the runway won the audience's vote and she was declared the winner. She and Angelea won specially designed pieces from Whitney Port's collection. While leaving for the photo shoot, the other contestants finally had enough of Alasia's tardiness and decided to leave her (with the elevator hanging up on Alasia, she resorted to use the stairs instead). The contestants were split into two teams – Angelea, Anslee, Krista, and Raina with their mentor Weaven Steven, and Alasia, Alexandra, and Jessica with Derek J. They had to model in dresses made entirely out of hair, with the other team will try to distract them. Krista embodied Grace Jones and she produced a stellar film. Alexandra's performance was once again deemed lukewarm. At the panel, a shepherd arrived with sheep, which led to the revelation that the top six girls would be going to New Zealand for the remainder of the competition. Krista is universally praised for her strong photo; Tyra commends her for her very strong film. Angela and Raina were praised too, while Jessica was praised again for her ability to jump, move and make her face look great at the same time. Alasia's shot was deemed purely admirable, though she was criticized for playing safe in her film. Anslee was praised for her strong face in her shot but is slated for looking stiff, while Alexandra was castigated for her awkward pose and proportions in her photo. Krista's strong performance earned her the first call-out, and she won a surprise first-class ticket to New Zealand. Anslee and Alexandra ended up in the bottom two; Anslee for not modeling with her entire body, and Alexandra for seemingly lacking the desire to be in the competition. In the end, Anslee was sent packing as Alexandra joined the other five contestants bound for New Zealand. After Anslee's elimination, Tyra allowed Krista to choose another girl to join her on her first-class flight; Krista chose Angelea.: Featured photographer: Jerry Metellus; Special guests: Whitney Port, Pat Cleveland, Weaven Steven, Derek J, Vincent Oquendo
169	8	"Welcome to New Zealand"	April 28, 2010	3.29
After an exhausting 22-hour flight, the contestants arrived in Auckland, then were taken to Mount Eden and greeted by a traditional Māori Haka, after which they were immediately sent for their go-sees challenge, with almost no time to prepare. Alasia, Angelea, and Krista received positive reviews from the designers, while Alexandra, Jessica, and Raina received mixed feedback. Only Alexandra, Angelea and Jessica made it back on time, while Alasia, Krista and Raina turned up late and were all disqualified. Angelea was deemed the best, having booked all six of her go-sees. She and Krista won an assortment of designer pieces. At their next photo shoot, the contestants were challenged to wear the same black Lloyd Klein dress and make the best out of that dress (with sheep as their background). At panel, when Angelea's photo was going to be discussed, she showed Tyra and the judges a "little club thingy". Krista showed up another powerful photo, but Alexandra's photo was deemed as one of the best in the History of America's Next Top Model and it won her the second best photo. Raina's photo was deemed as "told you thousands of tales" by Nigel, while Angelea's photo was criticized for showing the dress rather than herself. Ultimately Alasia and Jessica were called forward as the bottom two with Jessica for producing a poor photograph and Alasia for her lack of focus, but in the end it was Alasia who was eliminated, and Jessica was spared from elimination.: Featured photographer: Nigel Barker; Special guests: Sara Tetro, Colin Mathura-Jeffree, Anjali Stewart, Emma Stuart, Mark Burton, Kate Sylvester, Cybelle Wiren, Rachel Easting, Annah Stretton, Ryan Taniguchi, Vincent Oquendo, Joanna Konjevod
170	9	"Hobbits vs. Models"	May 5, 2010	3.41
Tension rose in the house when Angelea felt that her closest ally, Krista, was becoming closer to Alexandra than her. Jessica accidentally burnt a taco, setting the toaster on fire. The contestants arrived in Matamata, at the "Hobbiton" movie set for The Lord of the Rings film trilogy and met actress Sarah McLeod, who introduced them to their photo shoot challenge – they only had five frames to pose at the doorway of the Hobbit House. Angelea and Krista excelled, but it is the latter who won US$3,000 worth of designer clothes. Tyra was the photographer for this week's photo shoot, which required the contestants to pose in shadows. Alexandra was impressed by pushing through despite having a runny nose. Krista's knowledge of her angles earned her a third consecutive first call-out, tying the record set by Joanie Dodds in cycle 6. Tyra didn't feel enough enthusiasm coming from Raina, and she landed in the bottom two for the first time. But it was Jessica's lack of high fashion ability which caused her to be eliminated.: Featured photographer: Guy Coombes, Tyra Banks; Special guests: Sarah McLeod, Vincent Oquendo, Joanna Konjevod, Ryan Taniguchi
171	10	"Ugly Looking Woman"	May 12, 2010	3.77
André gave the contestants a surprise visit to advise them about the fashion industry, as well as shed some light on his early career beginnings, including working for Andy Warhol. The contestants packed up and flew for Queenstown for their next photo shoot, but were surprised when they heard Miss J's voice over the PA instructing them to walk down the plane aisles as part of a runway challenge. Alexandra impressed the Jays by bringing heels on board the plane, but Krista ultimately won her fourth challenge. She was rewarded with NZ$3,000 worth of Boh Runga jewelry (NZ$2,000 for winning the challenge and an additional NZ$1,000 for having the best photo) and the chance to walk at New Zealand Fashion Week. This week's shoot required the contestants to portray "ugly-pretty". All the contestants found a certain degree of success, and their photos similarly received both praise and criticism from different judges. Krista's outstanding photo earned her yet another first call-out. Alexandra's photo got all-loved by the judges. Raina was castigated for only doing well in higher-end shoots, but she still looked "pretty-pretty" when they asked her to be "ugly-pretty", Angelea's photo was considered average and generally bad by all the judges, while talking about Angelea and where she would go. In the end, Tyra handed Raina the last photo, eliminating Angelea and Alexandra.: Featured photographer: Monty Adams; Special guests: Ryan Taniguichi, Vincent Oquendo, Joanna Konjevod
172	11	"America's Next Top Model is..."	May 12, 2010	3.77
The final two took a helicopter ride to an overnight stay at Hurakia Lodge on Rakino Island. Miss J. arrived and handed them their CoverGirl commercial scripts. The next day, the finalists shot both their commercial and CoverGirl print ads. Krista blanked out during her commercial and was forced to use cue cards, but was praised for laughing off her mistakes instead of breaking down. Raina got her lines out without much fuss, but was impressed to deliver believability. The next day, the final two impressed Nigel during their Seventeen magazine cover shoot. When they returned to the house, Tyra surprised them with visits from their families; they proceeded to take a "Top Model" family portrait. Krista struggles to find her vivacious personality while Raina is impressed with her shoot. After this, the final two proceeded to the Auckland Museum for a rock and roll circus inspired Anna Sui fashion show. It was also revealed that the past 4 eliminated contestants – Alexandra, Angelea, Jessica, and Alasia – would also be walking with them. After the show, Tyra had some one-on-one time with Krista and Raina, where both shared their motivations for winning. At the final judging, Krista's walk was commended for being both commercial and high fashion at the same time, albeit slightly cheesy, whilst Raina's smile and freshness were appreciated. Their CoverGirl print ads also received mixed reviews – Raina's showed a classic CoverGirl look with a modern twist, while Krista's photo drew flak for failing to smile with her eyes. Only Raina's CoverGirl commercial was fully impressed. While discussing the final two's overall portfolios throughout the season, the judges deemed Krista as a more sophisticated and edgy model who would do well on the runway, while Raina was the beautiful contestant who would make waves internationally as a photo model. Krista was crowned the fourteenth winner of America's Next Top Model.: Featured photographers: Tony Drayton, Nigel Barker; Featured commercial director: Jonathan Mannion; Special guests: Nicole Fox, Vincent Oquendo, Ryan Taniguchi
173	12	"Chubby Bunny"	May 19, 2010	2.03
The recap episode recounted the first eleven episodes of the season. It includes never-before-seen footage, footage about Raina's own language called "Oh My Lanta!" and a game of marshmallows between Alexandra and Jessica called "Chubby Bunny".

== Summaries ==
=== Call-out order ===
Order	Episodes											
Order	1 (Note: In episode 1, the pool of 32 girls was reduced to 12. This call-out order does not reflect their performances that week. Additionally, the thirteenth girl–Ren–was scouted and later added to the cast.)	2		3	4	5	6	7	8	9	10 (Note: In episode 10, Alexandra, Angelea, and Raina were called forward as the bottom three. Tyra handed the last photo to Raina, eliminating the other two.)	11
1	Naduah	Jessica	Raina	Alasia	Alasia	Jessica	Angelea	Krista	Krista	Krista	Krista	Krista
2	Jessica	Angelea	Krista	Angelea	Raina	Angelea	Krista	Angelea	Alexandra	Alexandra	Raina	Raina
3	Simone	Ren	Anslee	Jessica	Tatianna	Krista	Raina	Raina	Raina	Angelea	Angelea; Alexandra	
4	Raina	Brenda	Tatianna	Alexandra	Brenda	Alasia	Alexandra	Jessica	Angelea	Raina	Angelea; Alexandra	
5	Tatianna	Simone	Simone	Krista	Alexandra	Anslee	Anslee	Alasia	Jessica	Jessica		
6	Alexandra	Tatianna	Alexandra	Raina	Angelea	Brenda	Jessica	Alexandra	Alasia			
7	Krista	Anslee	Angelea	Tatianna	Jessica	Raina	Alasia	Anslee				
8	Brenda	Raina	Alasia	Simone	Krista	Alexandra	Brenda					
9	Alasia	Naduah	Brenda	Anslee	Anslee	Tatianna						
10	Anslee	Alexandra	Jessica	Brenda	Simone							
11	Gabrielle	Krista	Ren	Ren								
12	Angelea	Alasia	Naduah									
13	Ren	Gabrielle										

The contestant was not included in the casting call-out order but was additionally added to the cast
The contestant was eliminated
The contestant won the competition

=== Bottom two ===
Episode	Contestants	Eliminated
2	Alasia & Gabrielle	Gabrielle
2	Naduah & Ren	Naduah
3	Brenda & Ren	Ren
4	Anslee & Simone	Simone
5	Alexandra & Tatianna	Tatianna
6	Alasia & Brenda	Brenda
7	Alexandra & Anslee	Anslee
8	Alasia & Jessica	Alasia
9	Jessica & Raina	Jessica
10	Alexandra, Angelea & Raina	Alexandra
10	Alexandra, Angelea & Raina	Angelea
11	Krista & Raina	Raina

The contestant was eliminated after their first time in the bottom two
The contestant was eliminated after their second time in the bottom two
The contestant was eliminated after their third time in the bottom two
The contestant was eliminated in the final judging and placed as the runner-up

=== Average call-out order ===
Casting call-out order and final two are not included.

=== Photo shoot guide ===
- Episode 1 photo shoot: Embodying famous models (casting)
- Episode 2 photo shoot was split into parts:
  - First part: Nude with Custo Barcelona items
  - Second part: Perfume beauty shots with the New York City skyline
- Episode 3 photo shoot: Dance genres
- Episode 4 photo shoot: Vampires in a bloody bathtub
- Episode 5 photo shoot: Faux fashion on Canal Street
- Episode 6 photo shoot: CoverGirl smoky shadow blast portraying New York women on a moving train
- Episode 7 photo shoot: Posing with hair dresses
- Episode 8 photo shoot: Posing in couture dresses with a sheep on a mountain
- Episode 9 photo shoot: Beauty shots with shadows
- Episode 10 photo shoot: Era-descent couture
- Episode 11 photo shoot and commercial: CoverGirl Blast collection, Seventeen magazine cover

=== Makeovers ===
- Gabrielle - Volumized curls and dyed strawberry blonde
- Naduah - Eyebrows bleached
- Ren - Cut to chin-length and underarms shaved
- Simone - Cut short and shaved on one side a la Cassie Ventura
- Tatianna - Long wavy golden blonde extensions
- Brenda - Halle Berry inspired pixie cut; later, shaved on the sides
- Anslee - Cut short and dyed honey blonde
- Alasia - Wild curly clip-in extensions
- Jessica - Straightened and dyed chocolate brown
- Alexandra - Gisele Bundchen inspired blonde highlights
- Angelea - Long straight golden blonde weave with bangs; later, weave removed
- Raina - Dyed dark chocolate brown
- Krista - Slicked back with clip-in ponytail

== Post-Top Model careers ==
- Gabrielle Kniery is currently signed with Fenton Moon Models in New York City and Centro Models and has modeled for KAS couture, Alive magazine, Do You Social Magazine, Gigi Designs, Scholarship clothing, Delux Magazine, and ID models. She also modeled for Remrod and Tuan Lee Photography. She also appeared as a pageant contestant in the music video for "Pretty Hurts" by Beyonce
- Naduah Rugely has done a variety of test shots, print ads, and runway.
- Ren Vokes has taken a few test shots. Since the show, she has modeled for Odyline and The Hundreds. She used to be signed with the Kim Dawson Agency in Dallas.
- Simone Lewis is currently signed with Exposure Model and Talent Agency and has taken a few test shots. Since the show, she has modeled for Bluefly and Gigi Designs.
- Tatianna Kern has modeled for Marlowe Holt.
- Brenda Arens is currently signed with Page.713 in Houston, Page Parkes Agency and Campbell Agency. Since the show, she has taken a few test shots, appeared in Seventeen Magazine, and has modeled for Rachel Roy. She used to be signed with the Campbell's Soup in Dallas and Flash Model Management in Milan.
- Anslee Payne-Franklin has modeled for Freeze Frame Studios and has done some test shots.
- Alasia Ballard has done a wedding dress test shoot, been featured in Delux Magazine and is currently signed to Holmes Lewis Models.
- Jessica Serfaty is currently signed with NEXT Model Management in Los Angeles and New York, Abrams Artists Agency in Los Angeles, Wunder Management and MDI Model Management in Korea. Since the show, she has appeared in Seventeen Magazine, booked a campaign with Papaya clothing and has been mainly focused on acting. She has appeared in commercials for McDonald's, Doritos, Toyota, and more. She's been busy going to auditions for TV shows, movies, and commercials. She can be seen in the music video "Justify Sex" by Dan Balan and "Highway Don't Care" by Tim McGraw and Taylor Swift. She recently finished a stint on the NBC soap opera Days of Our Lives, on which she played the sympathetically villainous character of Sloan Petersen from June 2022 to May 2024.
- Alexandra Underwood is currently signed with Wilhelmina Models in New York City and Models 1 in London. Since the show, she has taken a few test shots, and appeared on the cover of Plus Sized Magazine. She has walked in New York Fashion Week for the Sachika Twins.
- Angelea Preston has taken a few test shots. She has walked in New York Fashion Week for the Sachika twins and Richie Rich. She has starred in a commercial for Keratin Earth. Angelea has also been on the cover of Fashionista magazine. She is currently signed with Colby Models in New York City. Additionally, she participated on America's Next Top Model: All Stars, among other past competitors, and was disqualified in the finale finishing 3rd, before revealing later that she had actually been the original winner of the competition prior to her disqualification. Angelea has confirmed via Twitter that she is pregnant and is now married.
- Raina Hein is currently signed with Wilhelmina Models in Miami, Major Models in Paris, PhotoGenics in Los Angeles, LOOK Model Agency in San Francisco, Moore Creative Talent in Minneapolis, Ignite Models in Dallas, and Wehmann Models & Talent in Minneapolis. Since the show, she has taken various test shots, booked a campaign for Symphony Retailers in Dubai, appeared in Seventeen Magazine, Metro Magazine, Grazia Magazine, and appeared in Arabia's and Hong Kong's Harper's Bazaar. She walked in Dubai Fashion Week for Vera Wang. She also became the face of Furne One perfume for Bench and modeled with the collection in the Philippines. She has also done a campaign in The NeuHair and had a cover on the SU magazine 2013 issue. She is also a star in an independent feature film To Say Goodbye.
- Krista White has collected all her prizes and as of September 2011 was signed with Wilhelmina Models in New York City. She was featured in a back-to-school campaign for Max Rave in 2010, and walked in August 2010 for Betsey Johnson and Sergio Guadarrama at Austin Fashion Week and in September 2011 for Nicole Miller at New Zealand Fashion Week. In 2011, she walked the runway for BET's Rip The Runway; she has also worked as fashion director of DLXVRSN magazine.

== Cast members ==
- J. Alexander – runway coach
- Jay Manuel – photo shoot director
