= New Zealand's Next Top Model season 3 =

New Zealand's Next Top Model
- Season 3
- Promotional photograph of the cast of Season 3 of New Zealand's Next Top Model
- Presented by: Sara Tetro
- Judges: Sara Tetro; Colin Mathura-Jeffree; Chris Sisarich
- No. of episodes: 13

Release
- Original network: TV3
- Original release: 10 June – 2 September 2011

Season chronology
- ← Previous; Season 2

New Zealand's Next Top Model, Season 3 is the third and final season of New Zealand's Next Top Model which is a reality TV show based on America's Next Top Model. Fourteen young women compete for the title and a chance to start their career in the modeling industry. The prize for this season was a contract with 62 Model Management, a Ford Fiesta, a 1-year contract with CoverGirl cosmetics, a cover and 8-page editorial in CLEO Magazine, there would also be an all expenses paid trip to Paris and London to meet with NEXT Model Management.

The International destination for this season was Abu Dhabi, United Arab Emirates in the Middle East.

This was the only season to have a live finale, and to have the final runway held at New Zealand Fashion Week.
The winner of the competition was Brigette Thomas, from Motueka, making her the only winner from the South Island. She is the oldest winner at the age of 21.

== Contestants ==
(ages stated are at start of contest)

Contestants	Age	Height	Hometown	Finish	Place
Aminah Mohamed	23	174 cm (5 ft 8 1/2 in)	Christchurch	Episode 2	14
Holly Reid	18	175 cm (5 ft 9 in)	Oamaru	Episode 3	13
Yanna Hampe	16	177 cm (5 ft 9 1/2 in)	Auckland	Episode 4	12
Briana Allen	16	175 cm (5 ft 9 in)	Auckland	Episode 5	11
Amber Douglas	19	185 cm (6 ft 1 in)	Dunedin	Episode 6	10
Tyne Aitken	17	173 cm (5 ft 8 in)	Arrowtown	Episode 7	9
Arihana Taiaroa	19	175 cm (5 ft 9 in)	Dunedin	Episode 8	8
Aroha Newby	19	175 cm (5 ft 9 in)	Gisborne	Episode 10	7
Hillary Cross	17	170 cm (5 ft 7 in)	Clydevale	Episode 10	6
AJ Moore	19	178 cm (5 ft 10 in)	Auckland	Episode 11	5
Issy Thorpe	18	178 cm (5 ft 10 in)	Upper Hutt	Episode 12	4
Rosanagh Wypych	17	175 cm (5 ft 9 in)	Napier	Episode 13	3–2
Bianca Cutts-Karaman	16	177 cm (5 ft 9 1/2 in)	Auckland	Episode 13	3–2
Brigette Thomas	21	178 cm (5 ft 10 in)	Motueka	Episode 13	1

== Episode Summaries ==
=== Episode 1: Casting ===
Original Airdate: 10 June 2011

Season Three began with 33 hopefuls from all over the country, who were invited to the Bay of Islands. Here, they were greeted in the Waitangi Treaty Grounds by Season 2 winner Danielle Hayes who took them to the entrance of the Waitangi Marae where they received a formal Maori Pōwhiri, and greeting by judges Sara Tetro and Colin Mathura-Jeffree.

After their visit to the treaty grounds, the 33 girls were taken onto a yacht where their first challenge took place. Each girl had to pose at the bow of the moving yacht as it sailed around the bay, while showing off their best poses. Moore and Mathura-Jeffree deemed the challenge as a disaster (as most of the girls needed a lot of practice). When being interviewed, one girl admitted that she had tried out for the competition in order to get out of her dirty farm labour, while another girl admitted that her inspiration to enter the competition was in honour of her best friend who died in a car accident.

The next day the girls were taken to the Pompallier house - where Colin gave the girls a comical history lesson, and he tricked a couple of the girls into smelling urine. Here it was revealed that the visit to Pompallier House was not just fun and games, but an attempt to cut the number of girls down to 20 contestants. The remaining girls posed in a meadow, dressed in an early settler costume for their first real photoshoot with photographer Russ Flatt - to determine the final 13 girls. When the judges deliberated over the photos, the final 13 were chosen and they were all flown to their Auckland penthouse.

- Feature Photographer: Russ Flatt
- Special Guests: Teresa Moore & Danielle Hayes

=== Episode 2: Commercial Side ===
Original Airdate: 17 June 2011

The girls arrived at their Auckland penthouse, located on Queens Wharf and looking over the downtown waterfront. While the girls familiarised themselves with the new setting, Wildcard contestant Holly was introduced to the girls, surprisingly spotted relaxing in the penthouse spa pool. They were taken in a limousine to a downtown hair salon, where they were told they would all be receiving makeovers - to help transform them from a 'pretty girl, to a high fashion model'. Issy tried to keep a positive face, when she saw the stylist take out an electric razor, but was soon relieved when only one side of her hairline was shaved off. Holly, who was a natural brunette became shocked when she learned she would get her hair dyed a bright red, with her eyebrows colored to match - while Tyne was stunned when Sara whispered to her that she had a change of mind on her initial plan to give her long extensions, and now wanted to give her a short pixie cut. After the makeovers, most of the girls were thrilled with their new looks; but Tyne complained that she looked too much like a boy - and Briana thought that her newly bleached eyebrows were far too light.

Makeovers:

Contestants:	Original Hairstyle	New Hair Makeover
A.J.	Long straight auburn	Straightened with bangs trimmed and lightened with added highlights
Amber	Short dark brown	Cut shorter and dyed light blonde
Aminah	Shoulder length black hair	Cut shorter with added red highlights
Arihana	Shoulder length light red hair	Cut shorter with bangs and dyed fire engine red with matching eyebrows
Aroha	Chest length curly brown hair	Straightened with added highlights
Bianca	Dark brown "mullet"	Shoulder length wavy dark brown extensions with bangs
Briana	Long sandy blonde hair	Shoulder length cut with added blonde highlights and eyebrows bleached
Brigette	Light, toffee colored long hair	Layered with highlights
Hillary	Short scruffy light blonde	Trimmed and dyed dark brown
Holly	Long brown black wavy hair	Bob cut with bangs and dyed dark red
Issy	Shoulder length chestnut brown hair	Side of head shaved off
Rosanagh	Dark brown hair	Layered with added highlights and more volume
Tyne	Long dark blonde hair	Cut short with chin length side swept fringe
Yanna	Shoulder length curly reddish brown hair	Pixie cut and dyed dark brown

The next day the girls were taken to the Parnell Baths, where they had their first commercial photoshoot with photographer Steven Tilley. The shoot consisted of posing by the poolside, and advertising Magnum chocolate ice cream. Yanna impressed Chris with her bright smiling eyes while, others struggled to model, letting their head get in the way. At panel, Yanna, Tyne and Holly were praised for their beautiful photographs; while Brigette struggled to feel confident on set - and it showed in her picture. Briana was told that she looked very old in her photo. In the end, Aminah and Briana end up in the bottom two, and Aminah was eliminated for not connecting with the camera to sell the product.

- Wildcard Contestant: Holly Reid
- First Call-Out: Yanna Hampe
- Bottom Two: Aminah Mohamed & Briana Allen
- Eliminated: Aminah Mohamed
- Featured Photographer: Steven Tilley
- Special Guests: Paul Serville

=== Episode 3: Stand Out or Blend In ===
Original Airdate: 24 June 2011

Tensions rose in the Top Model house – as Tyne was convinced that Holly was attempting to steal all her friends. Penny Pickard and Colin Mathura-Jeffree schooled the girls on the art of walking the catwalk. Later, the Models were thrown into the deep end with a surprise runway show for Glassons. Some girls rose for the challenge, while others fell flat. Issy and A.J. failed spectacularly - while Tyne and Aroha came up trumps. Bianca, who was very awkward, felt the pressure as her confidence began to wilt with each step she took on the runway.

Aroha tore up the runway and won herself a $1000 shopping spree courtesy of Glassons, and a Ford Fiesta for 12 months. The brief: stand out from the crowd. The girls posed with five professional models – some were intimidated by their experienced colleagues but others proved that a Top Model is born - not made. Riding high from doing so well at the Catwalk challenge, both Aroha and Tyne aced the photo shoot. Hillary also impressed this week’s celebrity photographer, Tony Drayton. And, luck quickly run out for Wild Card Holly. The judges all agreed that Bianca and Brigette produced really strong photos, but The same couldn't be said for Holly and Issy who were in the bottom two. Holly was eliminated, Despite she was in the top 3 last week.

- First Call-Out: Bianca Cutts-Karaman
- Bottom Two: Holly Reid & Issy Thorpe
- Eliminated: Holly Reid
- Featured Photographer: Tony Drayton
- Special Guests: Penny Pickard & Shelley Ferguson

=== Episode 4: The Rough Diamond ===
Original Airdate: 1 July 2011

The episode began with the girls hitting a dance studio where they were taught lessons about posing by Wil Sabin. The stand out was Aroha, who won the prize for a second time. The next day they participated in a challenge at the Auckland Zoo, where they took 'face', 'torso' and 'legs' shots of each other in groups of three. After examining the photos, Colin and special guest Andy Blood determined that Rosanagh, Tyne and Arihana were the winners. Their prize was a photoshoot for a new advertisement for mobile phone operator 2degrees. When the remaining girls got back to the penthouse, they talked about how relieved they were that Tyne was away from the house for a few hours. The next day they received Sara Mail with the clue 'If you're the diamond, who's the rough?'. They arrived at Mainline Steam in Newmarket where they were greeted by celebrity photographer Guy Coombes and Chris Sisarich, who informed the girls they will be posing with a special guest, male model Vinnie Woolston. The stand out stars from the photoshoot were Brigette and Bianca. Bianca said she had to fake intimacy, because she's 'never had a boyfriend'. Some girls such as Rosanagh struggled being in the presence of male company. At the elimination panel, Brigette's photo clearly stuck out from the rest, AJ, Bianca & Rosanagh also received unanimous praise, while Amber's photo was dull and lifeless. Amber and Yanna landed in the bottom 2, but it was Yanna who was eliminated because she was becoming forgettable. Amber was spared, which rattled many of the girls because Yanna had gotten a First Call-Out only two weeks earlier.

- First Call-Out: Brigette Thomas
- Bottom Two: Amber Douglas & Yanna Hampe
- Eliminated: Yanna Hampe
- Featured Photographer: Guy Coombes
- Special Guests: Wil Sabin (Guest Judge) & Andy Blood

=== Episode 5: Celebrating Homegrown.. ===
Original Airdate: 8 July 2011

The episode began with Tyne attempting to steal Arihana's coveted carnie status by mucking about with Arihana's hula hoops. All the girls were discussing Yanna's sudden elimination, Issy who was the closest to Yanna, was not happy about her elimination; but she said it would give her more drive in the competition.

The girls received a Sara Mail, which asked the girls if they were "Movers and Shakers" in the competition. Aroha became concerned because she couldn't do either one. Later they met with a Vogue Dance Group and Colin, who announced that they would learn some dance moves. Some struggled, but it was Tyne and AJ who received all the praise.

Drama ensued after the performance when Bianca 'stole' Tyne's seat, with Tyne calling her a "stupid bitch". AJ starts a minor fight, and told Tyne that she was overly dramatic and rude. Tyne apologized, but stormed out and left the room, declaring that she couldn't be bothered with the situation.

Back at the house, Tyne felt like everyone was having a go at her. The next day, the models went to a farm in Te Kuiti. They met with Chris and some sheep shearers. Shearing champion David Fagan, and top wool handler Keryn Herbert, talked to the girls about wool and gave a shearing demonstration to them. Arihana was distraught when the sheep became scared, while A.J. seemed delighted at the experience. After the demonstration, the girls were challenged to deliver a 30-second ad-lib to a camera promoting NZ wool and NZ fashion. Arihana and the majority of the girls struggled. Aroha was very informative, but it was Issy who won the challenge due to her great communication skills.

The models went to Smash Palace, a car graveyard, where they had to pose for the Mai FM Street Jams album. Young Sid turns up and delivers a rap to the girls. At the photoshoot, Rosanagh, Bianca and A.J. do exceptionally great. Chris commented that Issy was perfect for the album cover, and that Brigette needed to relax a bit. Aroha had a hard time with the photographer's style - while Arihana, Amber and Briana fell flat.

At panel, Aroha stunned the judges with her photograph, despite her overall poor film. A.J. was told that her shot was "way too fierce" and the same comment was made to Bianca, although Chris believed that Bianca's picture was fantastic. Brigette and Rosanagh also received praise, but Rosanagh was told that her shot was more suitable for high fashion and that it wasn't urban enough. Issy's photo was deemed "so-so"; while Arihana, Amber, and Briana were castigated for their weak shots.

The judges believed that Arihana was lacking the "x-factor", while they thought that Amber was too sweet and Briana looked bored. Ultimately, Aroha won the chance to appear in the album cover and she received first call-out for her great shot. Arihana and Briana found themselves in the bottom two, but the judges decided to keep Arihana, resulting in Briana's elimination.

- First Call-Out: Aroha Newby
- Bottom Two: Arihana Taiaroa & Briana Allen
- Eliminated: Briana Allen
- Featured Photographer: Olivia Hemus
- Special Guests: DJ Ser-Vere, Young Sid, VOGUE Dance Crew

=== Episode 6: Vibrant Colours ===
Original Airdate: 15 July 2011

Stefan Knight, NZNTM’s Senior Make Up Artist, coached the girls on how to pose and convey a variety of emotions.

All the girls struggled to portray raw emotions, and Bianca learned to love her snaggle tooth. Colin and Cherie challenged the girls to create a make up look which complemented their colouring.

Aroha was a little heavy-handed with the eye shadow, whereas Bianca’s look was too subtle. Dark-horse Amber put the competition to shame with her elegant make up application and won the challenge.

The brief: to be young, fun, bold and sassy. The girls were treated to a photo shoot with a twist, before a surprise dinner guest and a vibrant photo shoot had them working with more colours than they could handle. This was the first time the girls had to contend with a wind machine. Tyne did phenomenally, Issy and Arihana gave their best performances yet. Aroha also did well. AJ started her film greatly, with her first 3 frames being good, but she ran out of poses and did badly the rest of the film. Amber and Bianca struggled and Hillary was declining rather than improving.

Model	Car Colour
A.J. & Arihana	Orange
Hillary & Rosanagh	Red
Amber & Tyne	Blue
Aroha & Issy	Black
Bianca & Brigette	Purple

At panel, Tyne cried in front of the judges, but refused to tell why. Sara said if she was miserable she would be sent packing. Then Tyne tells that she was accused of Bulimia when she was younger, annoying all the other girls for bringing it up. Tyne produced a stellar photograph, blowing the judges away, earning a first call-out. Issy also got a fantastic picture, being called by Colin "deliciously evil". The judges were disappointed in Rosanagh's performance, because she got a good photo, but played safe and could have been amazing. Arihana and Aroha also got positive feedback. The same can't be said for Amber and Bianca and they landed in the bottom 2. Bianca for her bad photo and Amber had potential, but she was always at the lower pack and inconsistent. In the end, Bianca was spared and Amber was eliminated.

- First Call-Out: Tyne Aitken
- Bottom Two: Amber Douglas & Bianca Cutts-Karaman
- Eliminated: Amber Douglas
- Featured Photographer: Hannah Richards
- Special Guests: Cherie Mobberley, Drew Neemia & Stefan Knight

=== Episode 7: Evoking Goddesses ===
Original Airdate: 22 July 2011

The girls discussed Tyne's comment during the previous elimination, when she brought up the accusations of bulimia she supposedly encountered as a young girl. Issy thought that Tyne was begging for attention, while Arihana stated that she had had enough of her. Colin met the remaining nine models at Spookers, and let them know that the theme for the week was all about ‘facing your fears’.

With that said, the girls had to run the gauntlet of a haunted house complete with zombies. A.J. had a meltdown, and Tyne was not too keen either, whereas Issy loved every minute of it.

The girls completed the Sky-walk, 192 meters up the Sky-tower, where they had to strike a pose in order to impress Chris and special guest judge, Rachel Hunter. A.J. struggled once more, but Hillary impressed greatly. Bianca won the challenge.

The brief: let your inner goddess shine.

The girls had to convey the goddess character they were each assigned for the shoot, as well as contend with some interesting modeling partners.

Model	Goddess
A.J.	War
Arihana	Wisdom
Aroha	Vanity
Bianca	Ambition
Brigette	Temptation
Hillary	Greed
Issy	Hunt
Rosanagh	Youth
Tyne	Victory

The judges all agreed that Rosanagh and Arihana had outperformed their competitors, while Aroha and Tyne had been left far behind as the bottom two. Aroha's consistency saved her, while Tyne was asked to leave the competition.

- First Call-Out: Rosanagh Wypych
- Bottom Two: Aroha Newby & Tyne Aitken
- Eliminated: Tyne Aitken
- Featured Photographer: Caroline Heslop
- Special Guests: Sara Chatwin, Rachel Hunter

=== Episode 8: Gender Swap ===
Original Airdate: 29 July 2011

It seemed that with Tyne’s elimination in the previous elimination, a new air of fun and calm descended on the Top Model house.

The remaining models had to walk the runway, but there was a twist – a blogger was there to provide running commentary on the girls’ ability to impress him.

Colin and Stefan Knight challenged the girls to get red-carpet-ready. In groups of two, the girls navigated the city, and were styled by AUT students. They then headed on over to Sky-City where the red carpet awaited them. Hillary won the challenge.

The girls dressed as men in this highly stylised shoot, and posed alongside comedian Madeleine Sami.

At panel, Hillary and Aroha impressed the most with their performance at the shoot, while Arihana turned up the least impressive photograph, and she was eliminated despite having a stellar portfolio.

- First Call-Out: Hillary Cross
- Bottom Two: A.J. Moore & Arihana Taiaroa
- Eliminated: Arihana Taiaroa
- Featured Photographer: Stephen Tilley
- Special Guests: Madeleine Sami

=== Episode 9: Recap Episode ===
Original Airdate: 5 August 2011

With only seven girls remaining, the series reviewed the first eight episodes of the season with never before seen footage.

=== Episode 10: A Mistake Can Send You Home ===
Original Airdate: 12 August 2011

The Top Models were given a secret challenge in which on their trip to the airport they had to deal with a rude taxi driver, paparazzi and an airport official, all of which were actually actors. This saw Aroha fall flat and ultimately made her miss out on the trip to Abu Dhabi. Hillary won the challenge and chose Issy to fly business class.

- Eliminated Outside of Judging Panel: Aroha Newby

Once the remaining six girls reached the Middle East, Colin and personal trainer Dane Kent put the girls through their paces in the extreme heat.

Finally the girls posed for one of the hardest photo-shoots yet with slow exposure. Ultimately Hillary went home, unraveling one of the most dramatic episodes of New Zealand's Next Top Model.

- First Call-Out: A.J. Moore
- Bottom Two: Hillary Cross & Rosanagh Wypych
- Eliminated: Hillary Cross
- Featured Photographer: Karen Inderbitzen-Waller
- Special Guests: Dane Kent

=== Episode 11: Lost in the Desert ===
Original Airdate: 19 August 2011

After losing both Aroha and Hillary last week, the girls were left reeling and Rosanagh in particular was shocked and grateful that she made it through to the next round after being in the bottom two. After a surprise visit from Stephen Lee from Next Model Management in New York, AJ let her nerves get the better of her while a fidgety Bianca received a lesson on confidence.

At the challenge, the models met with designer Aiisha Ramadan for a casting call where they competed to win an Acer computer tablet and one of Aiisha’s coveted pieces. Rosanagh won the challenge.

Judge Chris Sisarich was the photographer at the photo shoot in the middle of the desert where the girls modelled in sweltering temperatures. Unfortunately the heat was too much for AJ who broke down in tears and had to be carried back to the tent.

At elimination, Bianca and AJ were in the bottom two and AJ was sent home.

- First Call-Out: Brigette Thomas
- Bottom Two: A.J. Moore & Bianca Cutts-Karaman
- Eliminated: A.J. Moore
- Featured Photographer: Chris Sisarich
- Special Guests: Stephen Lee, Aiisha Ramadan & Kylie Cook

=== Episode 12: Etiquette, Go-Sees and Vintage ===
Original Airdate: 26 August 2011

On their arrival back to New Zealand the exhausted girls were taken straight from the airport to Dine by Peter Gordon where they were treated to a lesson in etiquette by actress Elizabeth Hawthorne and celebrate Issy's birthday.

For their challenge, the models were sent on go-sees with only four hours and a GPS enabled mobile phone to complete auditions with four designers around Auckland. Rosanagh won the prize of a Wella portfolio and a year’s supply of Wella products.

In a challenging 3D photoshoot for Wella pro series for old fashion, the girls were photographed by photographer Garth Badger.

Model	Product
Bianca	Shine
Brigette	Colour
Issy	Repair
Rosanagh	Volume

At elimination, Bianca and Issy were in the bottom two and Issy was eliminated.

- First Call-Out: Rosanagh Wypych
- Bottom Two: Bianca Cutts-Karaman & Issy Thorpe
- Eliminated: Issy Thope
- Featured Photographer: Garth Badger
- Special Guests: Elizabeth Hawthorne, Kathryn Wilson (Kathryn Wilson Shoes), Marissa and Liz Findlay (Zambesi), Zoe Williams (Zoe and Morgan Jewellery) and Emilie Pullar and Abbey Van Schreven (Maaike).

=== Episode 13: Live Finale ===
Original Airdate: September 2, 2011

This episode was presented live, with Shannon Ryan as live correspondent/narrator. The first half of the episode saw the girls talking on a beach of how tough the competition was and that this was it, final three. As they returned home Sara Mail was waiting, telling them to practice their lines for the Covergirl Commercial tomorrow. Whilst Rosanagh and Brigette were excited with the prospect of Covergirl, Bianca was less enthused. John Bridges directed and photographed the girls for this shoot.

At panel, Brigette was called out first leaving Bianca and Rosanagh in the bottom two, but the judges decided neither would leave and all three would be given the chance to walk in the World show at New Zealand fashion week.

- First Call-Out: Brigette Thomas
- Bottom Two: Bianca Cutts-Karaman & Rosanagh Wypych
- Eliminated: None
- Featured Photographer: John Bridges
- Special Guests: Cherie Mobberley, Taylor Swift (Video message), Myken Stewart

The girls met with the designers and got advice on practicing and being as good as if not better than the professional models. As they were practicing on the catwalk Colin came in to pull Rosanagh away to talk about the recent press controversy and her failure to disclose a second criminal conviction. She was allowed to keep her place in the competition.

The girls walked live in the World fashion show. The judges thought Bianca's walk was flawless, Brigette's was faultless, and although beautiful, Rosanagh's was too fast. All three girls were commended on their transformations on the show, with Bianca commended especially for showing the world a new side of beauty and that you do not have to be anyone but yourself to project it. Despite this, the winner ultimately announced live to be Brigette.

- Final Three: Brigette Thomas, Bianca Cutts-Karaman & Rosanagh Wypych
- New Zealand's Next Top Model: Brigette Thomas
- Final Runway: WORLD at New Zealand Fashion Week
- Special Guests: Francis Hooper, Benny Castles and Denise L'estrange-Corbet (World)

== Summaries ==
=== Call-out order ===
Order	Episodes												
Order	1	2	3	4	5	6	7	8	10	11	12	13	
1	Brigette	Yanna	Bianca	Brigette	Aroha	Tyne	Rosanagh	Hillary	A.J.	Brigette	Rosanagh	Brigette	Brigette
2	Amber	Tyne	Brigette	A.J.	Bianca	Isabel	Arihana	Aroha	Bianca	Rosanagh	Brigette	Bianca; Rosanagh	Bianca; Rosanagh
3	Aroha	Holly	Rosanagh	Bianca	Rosanagh	Arihana	Bianca	Brigette	Isabel	Isabel	Bianca	Bianca; Rosanagh	Bianca; Rosanagh
4	Briana	Aroha	Yanna	Rosanagh	A.J.	Aroha	Isabel	Rosanagh	Brigette	Bianca	Isabel		
5	Yanna	Arihana	Aroha	Isabel	Brigette	Brigette	A.J.	Bianca	Rosanagh	A.J.			
6	Arihana	Isabel	Tyne	Hillary	Isabel	Rosanagh	Brigette	Isabel	Hillary				
7	Bianca	Hillary	Hillary	Aroha	Tyne	A.J.	Hillary	A.J.	Aroha				
8	Rosanagh	Brigette	A.J.	Arihana	Hillary	Hillary	Aroha	Arihana					
9	Aminah	Amber	Briana	Tyne	Amber	Bianca	Tyne						
10	Hillary	Rosanagh	Arihana	Briana	Arihana	Amber							
11	A.J.	Bianca	Amber	Amber	Briana								
12	Tyne	A.J.	Isabel	Yanna									
13	Isabel	Briana	Holly										
14		Aminah											

The contestant was eliminated
The contestant was eliminated outside of judging panel
The contestant was part of a non-elimination bottom two
The contestant won the competition

- In episode 1, the pool of girls was reduced to 13 who moved on to the main competition. However, this first call-out does not reflect their performance that first week.
- In episode 2, Holly was revealed to be the wildcard contestant.
- In Episode 9 was the recap episode.
- In Episode 10, Aroha was eliminated outside of panel for her performance during a challenge at the airport.
- Episode 13 featured a non-elimination bottom two.

=== Average call-out order ===
Final two is not included.

Rank by average	Place	Model	Call-out total	Number of call-outs	Call-out average
1	1	Brigette	38	11	3.45
2	2-3	Rosanagh	41	11	3.73
3	2-3	Bianca	45	11	4.09
4	7	Aroha	31	7	4.43
5	4	Issy	51	10	5.10
6	9	Tyne	32	6	5.33
7-8	5	A.J.	51	9	5.67
7-8	12	Yanna	17	3	5.67
9	6	Hillary	50	8	6.25
10	8	Arihana	46	7	6.57
11	13	Holly	16	2	8.00
12	10	Amber	50	5	10.00
13	11	Briana	43	4	10.75
14	14	Aminah	14	1	14.00

=== Bottom two ===
Episode	Contestants	Eliminated
2	Aminah & Briana	Aminah
3	Holly & Issy	Holly
4	Amber & Yanna	Yanna
5	Arihana & Briana	Briana
6	Amber & Bianca	Amber
7	Aroha & Tyne	Tyne
8	A.J. & Arihana	Arihana
10	Hillary & Rosanagh	Hillary
11	A.J. & Bianca	A.J.
12	Bianca & Issy	Issy
13	Bianca, Brigette & Rosanagh	Bianca
13	Bianca, Brigette & Rosanagh	Rosanagh

The contestant was eliminated after her first time in the bottom two
The contestant was eliminated after her second time in the bottom two
The contestant was eliminated in the final judging and placed as the runner-up
The contestant won the challenge and was eliminated

=== Photo Shoot Guide ===
- Episode 1 Photo Shoot: Colonial New Zealand (Casting)
- Episode 2 Photo Shoot: Magnum Temptation Retro Shoot
- Episode 3 Photo Shoot: 1970s Glamour with Professional Models
- Episode 4 Photo Shoot: Diamonds in the Rough Swimsuits with Male Model
- Episode 5 Photo Shoot: Album Cover In a Car Junkyard
- Episode 6 Photo Shoot: Vibrant colour with Ford Fiesta
- Episode 7 Photo Shoot: Goddesses with Insects & Reptiles
- Episode 8 Photo Shoot: B/W Gender Swap with Madeleine Sami
- Episode 10 Photo Shoot: Movement Shoot in Abu Dhabi
- Episode 11 Photo Shoot: Desert Shoot in Abu Dhabi
- Episode 12 Photo Shoot: 3D Wella Pro Hair Shoot
- Episode 13 Photo Shoot & Commercial: CoverGirl Natureluxe Silk Foundation
