= New Zealand's Next Top Model season 2 =

New Zealand's Next Top Model
- Season 2
- Promotional photograph of the cast of Season 2 of New Zealand's Next Top Model
- Presented by: Sara Tetro
- Judges: Sara Tetro; Colin Mathura-Jeffree; Chris Sisarich
- No. of episodes: 13

Release
- Original network: TV3
- Original release: 6 August – 29 October 2010

Season chronology
- ← Previous; Season 1 Next → Season 3

New Zealand's Next Top Model, Season 2, is the second season of New Zealand's Next Top Model, a reality TV show based on America's Next Top Model. Auditions started on 5 June 2010 in Auckland and ended on 13 June 2010 in Tauranga. In this season, fourteen young women compete for the title of New Zealand's Top Model and a prize package comprising a contract with 62 Model Management, a one-year contract with CoverGirl cosmetics, an eight-page editorial in CLEO magazine, an all-expense paid trip to Sydney to meet with Ursula Hufnagl of Chic Model Management, a trip to Los Angeles to meet with Alexis Borges of NEXT Model Management and a brand new Ford Fiesta. The catchphrase for this season was "ALL THAT GLITTERS IS GOLD".

The international destination for this Season was Phuket, Thailand for one episode with six contestants.

The winner was 19-year-old Danielle Hayes, from Kawerau, Eastern Bay of Plenty; making her the only Maori contestant to win the title.

New Zealand's Next Top Model Season 2 was aired on TV3 New Zealand from early August to late October 2010.

== Contestants ==
(ages stated are at start of contest)

Contestant	Age	Height	Hometown	Finish	Place
Estelle Curd	19	180 cm (5 ft 11 in)	Wellington	Episode 2	14
Jamie Himiona	18	178 cm (5 ft 10 in)	Rotorua	Episode 3	13
Aafreen Vaz	20	181 cm (5 ft 11 1/2 in)	Dunedin	Episode 4	12
Amelia Nakagawa Gough	22	174 cm (5 ft 8 1/2 in)	Rotorua	Episode 5	11
Lauren Bangs	16	178 cm (5 ft 10 in)	Tauranga	Episode 6	10–9
Eva Duncan	16	175 cm (5 ft 9 in)	Dunedin	Episode 6	10–9
Holly Potton	20	175 cm (5 ft 9 in)	Auckland	Episode 7	8
Nellie Jenkins (Note: Elza and Nellie Jenkins are identical twins; however, they competed individually.)	17	180 cm (5 ft 11 in)	Dunedin	Episode 8	7
Lara Kingsbeer	16	178 cm (5 ft 10 in)	Hamilton	Episode 10	6
Dakota Biddle	18	178 cm (5 ft 10 in)	Christchurch	Episode 11	5
Courtenay Scott-Hill	17	175 cm (5 ft 9 in)	Wellington	Episode 12	4
Elza Jenkins	17	180 cm (5 ft 11 in)	Dunedin	Episode 13	3
Michaela Steenkamp	16	174 cm (5 ft 8 1/2 in)	Christchurch	Episode 13	2
Danielle Hayes	19	177 cm (5 ft 9 1/2 in)	Kawerau	Episode 13	1

== Episode summaries ==
=== Episode 1: All That Glitters Is Gold ===
Original Airdate: 6 August 2010

The first episode of New Zealand's Next Top Model Season 2 featured 33 hopefuls flown to Wellington, aspiring to become international models.

At the Museum Hotel, each contestant received a gift makeover from CoverGirl. They later headed to Boomrock, where they met host Sara, who arrived via helicopter. Judge Colin Mathura-Jeffree and fashion designer Alexandra Owen provided the girls with runway walking lessons.

After an interview in front of judges Sara Tetro, Colin Mathura-Jeffree, and Chris Sisarich, the girls faced elimination. Some contestants were immediately eliminated based on mannequins holding the name tags of the top 21 girls. The remaining 21 girls posed as Vintage Hollywood Movie Stars with photographer Russ Flatt.

Following the photo shoot, the judges deliberated on the girls' performances, leading to the next elimination. 13 girls were called forward, and in a surprising twist, Sara announced that 14 girls would continue to Auckland. Holly was the 14th and final contestant to make it through the round.

- Featured Photographer: Russ Flatt
- Special Guest: Alexandra Owen

=== Episode 2: The Girls Move To The Top Model House ===
Original Airdate: 13 August 2010

In this episode, the girls move to the Top Model house, where tension arises as Holly creates drama. They participate in a personal style challenge, with Elza winning. Later, they face a posing challenge with Colin, which proves challenging for many, except for Aafreen, who excels.

Back at the Top Model House, some girls gossip about each other, particularly Holly and Dakota expressing their dislike for Amelia. The girls have their first official photoshoot with photographer Rob Trathen. While Michaela, Elza, Courtenay, and Aafreen deliver impressive shots, Danielle struggles, causing her to break down in tears after her shoot.

During panel evaluation, Holly's lack of presence in her eyes is criticized, while Aafreen is praised for her versatile appearance. Elza, Michaela, and Eva's photos impress the judges, but Nellie faces criticism for laughing during the challenge, causing her to cry at the panel. Jamie and Estelle's amateur shots result in Estelle's elimination.

- First Call-Out: Eva Duncan
- Bottom Two: Estelle Curd & Jamie Himiona
- Eliminated: Estelle Curd
- Featured Photographer: Rob Trathen
- Special Guests: Anna Fitzpatrick

=== Episode 3: The Girls Get Down And Dirty ===
Original Airdate: 20 August 2010

In this episode, the girls attend a dance lesson with Colin and guest Taane Mete, focusing on movements to improve their posing skills. During the lesson, some girls receive praise, while others struggle to maintain focus and energy.

The girls receive a Sara Mail instructing them to pack their bags for what they hope will be international travel, but it turns out to be a road trip to Rotorua, Jamie and Amelia's hometown.

Upon arrival, the girls face a challenge to strike poses inside a rolling Zorb, with Courtenay winning and choosing Eva to share her spa treatment prize.

The photoshoot takes place at Hell's Gate mud pools, where the girls are covered in mud and adorned with tribal jewellery and headdresses. At panel evaluation, some girls deliver standout photos, while others receive criticism for their lack of variety or energy.

Dakota and Jamie land in the bottom two, with Dakota given another chance, and Jamie ultimately eliminated.

- First Call-Out: Lara Kingsbeer
- Bottom Two: Dakota Biddle & Jamie Himiona
- Eliminated: Jamie Himiona
- Featured Photographer: Jackie Meiring
- Special Guests: Taane Mete

=== Episode 4: The Girls Get Made Up and Over ===
Original Airdate: 27 August 2010

The episode begins with the celebration of Lauren's 17th birthday. Sara Mail informs the girls about their upcoming makeovers. Lauren expresses her displeasure about getting her hair cut short but is told that refusal could result in elimination. Ultimately, she tearfully agrees to a short bob cut. Lara's hair is dyed blond, Nellie and Elza receive identical makeovers, and Courtenay's makeover is altered from long and wavy to a short Twiggy-inspired cut.

MAKEOVERS:

Contestants:	Original Hairstyle	New Hair Makeover
Courtenay	Long wavy medium blonde	Shoulder length cut and dyed blonde; later, Twiggy inspired short blonde pixie cut with side fringe
Dakota	Shoulder length wavy brown hair	Shoulder length straight black cut with bangs
Danielle	Unkept long black hair	Two toned black to blonde shorter cut
Elza & Nellie	Long thin wavey red hair with side fringe	Layered with bangs and straightened
Holly	Long, light blonde hair	Shoulder length cut with side fringe and dyed darker blonde
Lara	Blonde Hair	Bob cut and dyed light strawberry blonde
Michaela	Shoulder length brown hair with blonde streaks and side fringe	Straightened with bangs and dyed dark brown
Lauren	Long brown Hair	Short chin length bob with bangs and dyed dark brown
Eva	Long brown Hair	Trimmed and darkened
Amelia	Long black Hair	Trimmed and layered with added highlights
Aafreen	Long black Hair	Layered with added light brown highlights

Following their makeovers, the girls participate in an Alexandra Owen runway show to showcase their new looks. They later face a social networking challenge with the show's sponsors and members of the fashion industry. Dakota's immature behavior leaves a negative impression, while Nellie and Elza receive positive feedback, and Lauren's maturity wins her the challenge.

For this week's photoshoot, the girls pose with colorful birds as companions for the Louise Pilkington jewelry line. At the panel, Danielle's photo redeems her earlier catwalk performance, earning her the first call-out. Nellie and Elza receive praise for their strong shots, while Eva and Courtenay are also commended. However, Amelia and Lara face criticism for a lack of emotional variety in their photos. Holly is criticized for lacking warmth in her photos, and Aafreen's shot and over-analyzing lead to her being in the bottom two. Ultimately, Aafreen is eliminated.

- First Call-Out: Danielle Hayes
- Bottom Two: Aafreen Rachael Vaz & Holly Potton
- Eliminated: Aafreen Rachael Vaz
- Featured Photographer: Fiona Quinn
- Special Guests: Paul Serville, Louise Pilkington, Alexandra Owen, Donna Gilray, Cherie Mobberley & Mark Pitt

=== Episode 5: The Girls Are Smokin' Hot ===
Original Airdate: 3 September 2010

The episode begins with Aafreen leaving a farewell note to the girls. Sara arrives at the house to take commercial polaroids of each girl and introduces rugby star Dan Carter, who selects Eva to feature on Water For Everyone bottles, making her the first non-All Black to do so. Eva proceeds to the campaign photoshoot.

Later, the girls meet with Colin and Denise Gray from Herbal Essences, who assign them a task to introduce a new product to pedestrians on the streets. Holly wins the challenge for her personality and quick thinking, earning a photoshoot for Herbal Essence featured in Cleo Magazine.

During the Smokefree's Smoking Not Our Future ad campaign photoshoot with Duncan Cole, several girls receive praise for their shots, while Holly and Dakota face criticism. Nellie and Amelia land in the bottom two, resulting in Amelia's elimination and her offering parting words of wisdom to the remaining girls.

- First Call-Out: Michaela Steenkamp
- Bottom Two: Amelia Gough & Nellie Jenkins
- Eliminated: Amelia Gough
- Featured Photographer: Duncan Cole
- Special Guests: Dan Carter, Kate Sylvester, Denise Gray, Claudia Rodrigues, Dave Gibson & Neil Pardington

=== Episode 6: The Girls Are Fit As A Fiddle ===
Original Airdate: 10 September 2010

The girls start off their week with a visit from Sara and her personal trainer Brad Werner. They got measured and their BMI taken. Dakota's inappropriateness came out thus slightly intimidating Brad. Later that day, they received a workout session with Brad and were given heaps of exercise equipment.

For this week's challenge, they meet with Colin and Cherie Mobberley from CoverGirl. The challenge was to apply makeup to their designated partners and give them a smokey eye using a wide range of Covergirl products. Before the challenge started, Dakota was heavily criticized by Colin for her horrible outfit and was described as being someone who lives under a bridge. During the challenge, Danielle and Eva performed horribly while Holly, Elza and Dakota performed well. Holly was picked as the winner and received a year's supply of Covergirl cosmetics.

At the photo shoot, the girls worked with photographer Tony Drayton and were shot in pairs in high fashion outfits in front of an urban graffiti setting. Courtenay, Michaela and Lara received praise while Eva and Lauren struggled. Danielle and Dakota had a bit of trouble working together while Holly's awkward posing was criticized.

Pairs
Courtenay & Lauren
Dakota & Danielle
Elza & Nellie
Eva & Michaela
Holly & Lara

At the judging panel, Dakota sucked the life out of Danielle in their shoot and Holly's lack of warmth on her photos were criticized once again but, in the end, it was both Eva and Lauren who landed on the bottom two and were subsequently eliminated.

- First Call-Out: Courtenay Scott-Hill
- Bottom Two/Eliminated: Eva Duncan & Lauren Bangs
- Featured Photographer: Tony Drayton
- Special Guests: Brad Werner, Shelley Ferguson & Cherie Mobberley

=== Episode 7: The Girls Act Out ===
Original Airdate: 17 September 2010

The girls talk about the surprise double elimination and read the parting letters from Eva and Lauren. Elza and Nellie celebrate their 18th birthday with a dinner party. This week, the girls will go back to basics by practicing their runway walks with Colin. Colin said Dakota was trying but has a short attention span, Nellie and Elza were praised for their walks and Danielle made a big improvement despite accidentally kicking her heel off which hit Elza in the head.

The challenge this week was a model trivia, and the girls were questioned by Colin accompanied by an international Kiwi model Ella Drake. The winner was Elza and she received accessories from an assortment of designers. Back at the model house, Nellie felt the pressure as Elza was doing better than her while Danielle's hand is bandaged as we are told by Lara that she punched a hole in the wall. At the photo shoot this week, the girls had to do an over-dramatic shoot representing one of the new 8 Herbal Essences products. Russ Flatt was the photographer and was pleased with Dakota, Nellie and Elza's out there performances. He was disappointed in Lara's lack of variety, Holly's poor modeling ability in general and Danielle's tendency to get self-conscious.

Contestants:	Herbal Essences Product
Courtenay	"Colour Me Happy"
Dakota	"Hello Hydration"
Danielle	"Break's Over"
Elza	"Dangerously Straight"
Holly	"Body Envy"
Lara	"Drama Clean"
Michaela	"None Of Your Frizzness"
Nellie	"Long Term Relationship"

At elimination panel, nearly every contestant received praise for their good shots. Lara was told her shot was good but the journey she took to get there and the feedback the received on her shoot was horrible. Holly was told her shoot was average and the judges said her eyes were dead like there was nothing behind them. Dakota got the first call-out while Holly and Lara ended up in the bottom two. In the end, Lara was given another chance and Holly's constant lack of warmth in her photos sent her home.

- First Call-Out: Dakota Biddle
- Bottom Two: Holly Potton & Lara Kingsbeer
- Eliminated: Holly Potton
- Featured Photographer: Russ Flatt
- Special Guests: Denise Gray, Claudia Rodrigues, Ella Drake

=== Episode 8: The Girls Drive Each Other Mad ===
Original Airdate: 24 September 2010

The girls start off with a Lonely Hearts Lingerie runway show at church. Courtenay and Michaela were a bit apprehensive because of their religion while Dakota wanted them to pray before the show started stating that she was Christian too, though the other girls were skeptical. All of the girls performed well except Dakota who lost her focus when she overheard someone laugh at her because of her awkward walk.

Later, the girls were greeted by Chris who told them that they would be starring in a new music video for Opshop. The girls learned the choreography and put it to use posing elegantly in the wind. Then, they were told that three girls would be selected to stay late and shoot more of the video underwater. Lara, Elza and Danielle were picked, and Nellie was chosen as a fourth girl because the director liked the idea of having twins so he could get double the takes. The girls performed in the cold pool until 5 in the morning. Back in the model house, the unselected girls Dakota, Courtenay and Michaela were having dinner until Dakota decided to speak ill of Lara and her figure. Michaela found Dakota's negativity irritating thus telling her to grow up and feeling the need to punch her. Dakota said she was just being realistic and encouraged Michaela to start a fight with her.

For this week's photoshoot, Chris will be the photographer while Sara will watch the girls in action. They will be posing with Ford Fiesta posing in an explosive James Bond style. Before the start of the shoot, Lara was told she was the challenge winner and won the prize. During the shoot, Dakota's uncoordinated running was photographed well, Danielle's bad girl attitude worked well and Michaela's breakdown saying she was distracted for not being picked for the Opshop video didn't pan out well in her photoshoot. Elza became ill due to exhaustion from the music video and was seen by an ambulance, Nellie was distracted during her shoot worrying about her sister. Elza came right and performed well during her shoot.

At the panel, the girls were informed they were off to Phuket, Thailand but only 6 of them were going. Danielle, Courtenay, and Lara were praised for their shots and Elza was commended for completing the shoot. Dakota received good feedback on her photo, but the judges think she is more of a coincidental model and also was heavily criticized for her runway walk. Nellie was also criticized for giving one pose in every frame. Danielle got the first call-out while Nellie and Dakota landed in the bottom two. Nellie for her average photo and Dakota for her awful runway walk. In the end, Dakota was saved, and Nellie was eliminated in an extremely tearful goodbye for Elza.

- First Call-Out: Danielle Hayes
- Bottom Two: Dakota Biddle & Nellie Jenkins
- Eliminated: Nellie Jenkins
- Music Video Director Ivan Slavov
- Featured Photographer: Chris Sisarich
- Special Guests: Jason Kerrison & Steve Ferguson

=== Episode 9: The Girls Get A Second Look ===
Original Airdate: 1 October 2010

Recap Episode: With only six girls remaining, it's time to take an inside look at life in the Top Model house including extended scenes and never before seen footage of the girls at work, and at play.

=== Episode 10: The Girls Are Same-Same But Different ===
Original Airdate: 8 October 2010

The episode starts with the final six contestants traveling in first-class to Phuket, Thailand. In the morning, Chris gets the girls to take a kickboxing lesson, which helped with their fitness and endurance. The girls then took a break from work and had a night off at a theme park. During dinner, Sara surprises them with an unexpected visit and bluntly asked them to point out who they thought will be the bottom two this week. Almost unanimously, the girls picked Dakota. After Sara left the girls, Dakota attacked Lara verbally pointing out her body figure problems. The next day the girls went on an elephant trek and shopping trip. While most of the girls enjoyed it, Lara was disappointed that she was paired with Dakota.

The challenge this week had the girls making their own Phuket inspired outfit and wear it in an impromptu runway. Lara won the challenge due to her creativity and was awarded twenty extra frames at the photo shoot. This week's photo, the girls will be posing in swimwear in a Phuket beach with photographer Tony Drayton but with a special guest, an elephant.

At panel, Danielle, Courtenay and Elza received praise from the judges. Michaela was told she needs to give different range of looks in her face due to having one look in her previous photos. During Lara's evaluation, she calls out Dakota for her insulting comments and was told to apologize. Lara was told she performed poorly and wouldn't have had a good shot without the twenty extra frames. At Dakota's evaluation, Sara said she was disingenuous, and her behaviour was a sure-fire way to go home. Dakota was then criticized for her photo too. Lara and Dakota ended up in the bottom two. Lara for only getting one good shot in her twenty extra frames and Dakota for her behaviour and bad photoshoot. Surprisingly, Dakota was given another chance and Lara was sent home.

- First Call-Out: Danielle Hayes
- Bottom Two: Dakota Biddle & Lara Kingsbeer
- Eliminated: Lara Kingsbeer
- Featured Photographer: Tony Drayton

=== Episode 11: The Girls Fade Into The Background ===
Original Airdate: 15 October 2010

The episode starts with the girls back at their Auckland penthouse. Dakota is immediately excluded from the other girls who are confused as to why she is still there, while Dakota praises herself for still being in the competition. Later in the day, the girls receive a surprise visit from Season One Winner Christobelle and International Model Ngahuia Williams who give the girls important tips for proper skin care underneath makeup (using Nivea Visage Products). Christobelle shares that one of the biggest problems she had when first wearing makeup was breaking out from using the wrong skin products.

The next day the girls receive Sara Mail informing them to get ready for an Infomercial. The girls arrive at an old heritage building in downtown Auckland where they are greeted by Colin and special guest Ursula Hufnagl who unknown to the girls at the time, is the owner of Chic Model Management. Hufnagl inspects the girls at work to pick up their personalities. When they start filming their campaigns, Dakota appeared too overconfident on camera, Courtenay was criticized for appearing as if she was reading from a script and Danielle coped with the stress by swearing on camera. At the end of filming Elza won the challenge with Dakota. Their prize was a trip to a restaurant where they are again greeted by Christobelle in which she hands $500 over to a tearful Elza, all to Dakota's jealousy. That night they receive Sara mail for the next day's photoshoot.

The girls arrive at Eden Gardens where they have to pose nude but alluded by full body paint portraying different fictional creatures. All of the girls amaze the photographer. Back at the house, Courtenay, Danielle and Michaela soak in a spa pool and discuss who they think should stay and go home. To no surprise, Dakota is the favourite to go home, but Courtenay worries that Elza might be sent packing. At judging, Courtenay, Danielle and Elza were praised for their photos, while Michaela was praised by Sara and Chris, but Ursula Hufnagl thinks that she looks too relaxed in a wrong setting. Elza and Dakota end up in the bottom two. Elza for her declining confidence without her twin sister, and Dakota for the repetition of mediocre photos. In the end, Dakota was sent home.

Contestants:	Own Charity
Courtenay	"Save Our Future"
Dakota	"Beat The Statistic"
Danielle	"Homes For Everybody"
Elza	"Real Red Heads Unite"
Michaela	"Heart For Africa"

- First Call-Out: Courtenay Scott-Hill
- Bottom Two: Dakota Biddle and Elza Jenkins
- Eliminated: Dakota Biddle
- Featured Photographer: David Shields
- Special Guests: Ursula Hufnagl, Christobelle Grierson-Ryrie, Ngahuia Williams & Yolanda Bartram

=== Episode 12: The Girls Shop Till They Drop ===
Original Airdate: 22 October 2010

The episode starts with Elza confessing her nervousness from her bottom two experience last week and Danielle talking about how happy she is that Dakota was finally eliminated. Later, they receive Sara Mail informing them to get ready to take on the all-anticipated Go-See's. Michaela takes the letter and starts a chase through the house and while hiding in the toilet, Danielle sits on a seat and accidentally breaks a wall open. The next day, they arrive at a building in downtown Auckland where they are greeted by Colin who confirms that they will be doing a Go-See Challenge. Five male models from 62 Models walk in the room and they will personally drive them individually in a Ford Fiesta car to their Go-Sees.

All of the girls had a hard time navigating the city, as none of the remaining contestants were from Auckland. Elza had a hard time navigating K Road and the Central Business District while Courtenay drives on the Auckland Harbour Bridge six times in a row due to having navigation problems. At the Go-Sees, Michaela instantly impresses her first client and Danielle comes off funny and quoted as having a very valuable exotic look while Courtenay's runway walk at one Go-See was too bouncy. For the last Go-See Challenge, every contestant struggled to map their way through a downtown Auckland High School. Once they found the gym, the girls were photographed shooting a basket hoop. Michaela was the first to arrive back at The Department Store at 5pm followed by Danielle and Elza. Courtenay arrived 10 minutes late and was disqualified from receiving the prize. Colin announces that Courtenay did not get any bookings from any Go-See's because she did not deliver in any of them. Michaela impressed almost every Go-See with her charm and good looks, but it was Danielle who won the challenge for winning 9 out of 10 bookings. For this she won a Ford Fiesta Car to own for a year and became the new ambassador for Ford Fiesta.

Back at the house, Courtenay shared her sorrow and frustration to Michaela about her miserable performance at the Go-Sees. The girls receive Sara Mail the next day for the photoshoot. The girls arrive at a new Glassons clothing store in downtown Auckland where they are greeted by Chris and their photographer, Craig Owen. The girls are told that they are going to pose for new advertisements for the clothing store while portraying over dramatic feminine alter egos. Elza is up first, who instantly impresses the photographer. She is quoted as having 'a lovely angelic face'. Elza's wig for the shoot was inspired by Lady Gaga's hair bow. Courtenay comes on set and is expected to do well, but the photographer cannot connect with her, and Chris thinks that she is trying too hard because of her poor performance in the Go-Sees challenge. Michaela has an unexpected breakdown while in hair and make-up, but she still impresses the photographer and manages to get one of the best shots, even though Chris had complained that she looked like she was going to burst into tears of misery. Once back from the shoot, the girls received Sara Mail informing them of the elimination the next day. Michaela tells the girls that she feels so close but yet so far and doesn't want to be eliminated.

At judging panel, Michaela reveals that she had a minor break-down before the photoshoot due to the pressure of being in the Top 4. Courtenay cries in front of the judges due to not having any bookings in any of the Go-Sees. Elza and Michaela were praised for their photos. Danielle's photo is criticized for being plain although was commended for having the hardest set to work with and Courtenay's performance through the week let her photo down. Elza & Courtenay ended up in the bottom two. Courtenay for lacking confidence and poor over-all performance in the Go-Sees and the photoshoot. In the end, Courtenay was eliminated.

- First Call-Out: Michaela Steenkamp
- Bottom Two: Courtenay Scott-Hill & Elza Jenkins
- Eliminated: Courtenay Scott-Hill
- Featured Photographer: Craig Owen
- Special Guests: Francis Hooper, Karen Iberditzen-Waller, Teresa Brady, Atip W, Chris Masterton, Guy Coombes, Di Humphries & Anjali Stewart

=== Episode 13: The Girl Who Is New Zealand's Next Top Model ===
Original Airdate: 29 October 2010

Before the episode starts, a reminder of how the season started is played, 33 girls arrived in Wellington hoping to make their dreams come true but only 14 made it into the top model house in Auckland. The season has seen tears, tantrums, the good the bad and the Dakota and now it is down to the final three: Michaela, the consistent 16-year-old with piercing green/blue eyes from Christchurch, Danielle the wisecracking 19-year-old who entered on a dare and Elza the competition sweetheart who blossomed. At the start of the episode Michaela shares her sympathy and difficulty she is facing without Courtenay there, but that alone will make her want to win harder, she also shares that she feels so happy and privileged. Elza and Danielle play mock dress-up and scream through the house. The girls receive Sara Mail that night informing them about the CoverGirl commercial the next day, also in the mail are three scripts that the girls must revise.

The next day the girls arrive at the CoverGirl Studio and are greeted by Colin, their commercial director Tony Drayton and their print photographer Fiona Quinn. The girls go immediately into hair & makeup. Michaela is up first who is feeling strongly confident that she will succeed in her performance. She delivers a 'flawless' commercial and Drayton is impressed by how she used her hands. When she has her CoverGirl photo, Colin calls her a breath of fresh air, and she manages to get a great shot. Danielle confesses that she couldn't be bothered learning her lines and once in front of the camera finds it nearly impossible to deliver her first sentence, in the end she has to use cue cards. She breaks down in the middle of the shoot because of her fear of failing, Colin quotes that she didn't make much effort into learning her lines. She appears relaxed in her photoshoot. Elza walks onto her commercial confident and ready. She delivers a 'good' performance and Tony Drayton quotes that she had 'Wonderful energy & looked the part. Back at the penthouse they find Sara Mail informing them of the proceeding elimination.

At judging they are told that they will be critiqued by how well they performed in their CoverGirl PhotoShoot & Commercial. Michaela is called up first and tells the judges that she felt 'beautiful' in the CoverGirl shoot. She is instantly praised for her clear happy commercial and brilliant photoshoot which showed off her piercing green eyes. The judges all agree that Michaela's effort in the CoverGirl challenge was flawless. Elza is criticized for winking and throwing her hair back in the commercial by Sara and the judges all agree that her photo looks more like an artistic portrait than a beauty shot. Danielle breaks down while standing before the judges, she is also criticized for not learning her lines by Sara and told by special guest judge Denise L'estrange-Corbet that she obviously doesn't want to be a model if she doesn't want to learn her lines. She gets a great commercial but only because of editing, but also gets a striking photo. Danielle and Elza end up in the bottom two. Elza because of lacking ability to perform in commercials and Danielle for the terrible commercial. In the end Elza is sent packing because Danielle's overall performance in the competition is better. Danielle and Michaela pack their bags for their final challenge and are flown to Wellington where the journey began 12 weeks earlier.

- First Call-Out: Michaela Steenkamp
- Bottom Two: Danielle Hayes & Elza Jenkins
- Eliminated: Elza Jenkins
- Featured Photographer: Fiona Quinn
- Commercial Director: Tony Drayton

In the second half of the episode the girls arrive in Wellington and sit at the waterfront and recollect their memories of being among 30 other girls in the same place only 12 weeks earlier. They arrive at the TSB Arena and get fitted for their costumes in the WOW World Of Wearable Arts Artistic Runway Show. One of Michaela's outfits is made from horsehair and Danielles ringleader outfit required her to be fitted into a corset. They are then taken through a rundown of the route they have to take on the runway since there are 5 different runways in the show.

A couple of hours later, the stage is full of mystical creatures and bright marsion lighting. Danielle and Michaela wish each other luck backstage then go on their way. Chris, Sara & Colin are seated in the front row to get a good view of the final two. Michaela enters the runway in her first costume and is quoted to look professional and relaxed. Danielle enters and is quoted as looking nervous and overwhelmed about wearing heels. In the second half of the show, Michaela is a Viking character and Danielle, a ringleader. Danielle forgets her choreography that they had learnt earlier and puts Michaela off, leaving her to forget her dance moves as well. Michaela worries that Danielle has ruined her chances of winning now.

The girls arrive at final judging and are reminded one last time about the luxury prizes that they will be receiving. Sara reminds Danielle of how modelesque she is and reminded her of what she said on the first day 'whether you like it or not, you are a model'. Sara shares that Michaela has always been consistent throughout the season, a stunning young girl, who shows maturity well beyond her 16 years. Colin also shares that Michaela looked amazing on the runway. The girls are sent out while the judges deliberate. The judges look over the photos of the two girls throughout the season. Both girls seem to be tied on effort in their photos making it harder for the judges to find a winner. Michaela's weakness felt by the judges is that when she loses expression in her eyes, her photos are dull and her one look. While Danielle's weakness is her having difficulty to try new things and her tendency to get self-conscious. When the girls re-enter the room, Sara shares that Danielle has come a long way, hit few speed bumps but got there while Michaela has been consistent and rising in each photo. Danielle's face appears on the LCD Screen, and she is announced the winner of the second season, and thus the first unconventional beauty and to claim the title. Michaela says in an emotional interview that she is going to still pursue modeling and buy a Ford Fiesta car with her own money. Danielle cannot believe that she has just won Top Model, especially because she only entered on a dare.

- Final Two: Danielle Hayes & Michaela Steenkamp
- New Zealand's Next Top Model: Danielle Hayes
- Final Runway: World of Wearable Art
- Special Guests: Cherie Mobberley & Denise L'estrange-Corbet

== Summaries ==
=== Call-out order ===
Order	Episodes												
Order	1	2	3	4	5	6	7	8	10	11	12	13	
1	Danielle	Eva	Lara	Danielle	Michaela	Courtenay	Dakota	Danielle	Danielle	Courtenay	Michaela	Michaela	Danielle
2	Aafreen	Michaela	Michaela	Nellie	Lauren	Lara	Michaela	Courtenay	Courtenay	Michaela	Danielle	Danielle	Michaela
3	Lara	Danielle	Elza	Elza	Elza	Dakota	Courtenay	Elza	Elza	Danielle	Elza	Elza	
4	Jamie	Elza	Danielle	Lauren	Danielle	Michaela	Danielle	Lara	Michaela	Elza	Courtenay		
5	Courtenay	Courtenay	Courtenay	Eva	Lara	Elza	Elza	Michaela	Dakota	Dakota			
6	Michaela	Dakota	Aafreen	Courtenay	Eva	Nellie	Nellie	Dakota	Lara				
7	Nellie	Lara	Nellie	Dakota	Courtenay	Danielle	Lara	Nellie					
8	Lauren	Lauren	Lauren	Michaela	Holly	Holly	Holly						
9	Eva	Aafreen	Holly	Amelia	Dakota	Eva; Lauren							
10	Elza	Nellie	Eva	Lara	Nellie	Eva; Lauren							
11	Estelle	Holly	Amelia	Holly	Amelia								
12	Dakota	Amelia	Dakota	Aafreen									
13	Amelia	Jamie	Jamie										
14	Holly	Estelle											

The contestant was eliminated
The contestant won the competition

- In episode 1, the first call-out does not reflect the girls' performance that first week, additionally when the cast size was increased to 14, as Holly was put through to the competition.
- In episode 6, Eva and Lauren landed in the bottom two. Both of them were eliminated.
- Episode 9 was the Recap Episode.

=== Average call-out order ===
Final two is not included.

Rank by average	Place	Model	Call-out total	Number of call-outs	Call-out average
1-2	1	Danielle	34	11	3.09
1-2	2	Michaela	34	11	3.09
3	3	Elza	39	11	3.55
4	4	Courtenay	36	10	3.60
5	6	Lara	42	8	5.25
6	5	Dakota	54	9	6.00
7-8	9-10	Eva	31	5	6.20
7-8	9-10	Lauren	31	5	6.20
9	7	Nellie	48	7	6.86
10	12	Aafreen	27	3	9.00
11	8	Holly	55	6	9.17
12	11	Amelia	43	4	10.75
13	13	Jamie	26	2	13.00
14	14	Estelle	14	1	14.00

=== Bottom two ===
Episode	Contestants	Eliminated
2	Estelle & Jamie	Estelle
3	Dakota & Jamie	Jamie
4	Aafreen & Holly	Aafreen
5	Amelia & Nellie	Amelia
6	Eva & Lauren	Eva
6	Eva & Lauren	Lauren
7	Holly & Lara	Holly
8	Dakota & Nellie	Nellie
10	Dakota & Lara	Lara
11	Dakota & Elza	Dakota
12	Courtenay & Elza	Courtenay
13	Danielle & Elza	Elza
13	Danielle & Michaela	Michaela

The contestant was eliminated after her first time in the bottom two
The contestant was eliminated after her second time in the bottom two
The contestant was eliminated after her third time in the bottom two
The contestant was eliminated after their fourth time in the bottom two
The contestant was placed as the runner-up in the final judging

=== Photo Shoot Guide ===
- Episode 1 Photo Shoot: Vintage Hollywood Movie Stars (Casting)
- Episode 2 Photo Shoot: Suspended Ethereal Fairies
- Episode 3 Photo Shoot: Tribal Mudpool Shoot
- Episode 4 Photo Shoot: Jewellery Beauty Shots with Birds
- Episode 5 Photo Shoot: Smoking Not Our Future Black & White Shots and Promos
- Episode 6 Photo Shoot: Demons on an Graffiti in Pairs
- Episode 7 Photo Shoot: Over-dramatic Herbal Essences Shoot
- Episode 8 Photo Shoot: Ford Fiesta Action Shoot
- Episode 10 Photo Shoot: Swimwear with Elephant on Phuket Beach
- Episode 11 Commercial & Photo Shoot: Own Charity Commercial / Body Painting Monsters
- Episode 12 Photo Shoot: Glassons Fun Fair Shoot
- Episode 13 Commercial & Photo Shoot: CoverGirl
