= New Zealand's Next Top Model season 1 =

New Zealand's Next Top Model
- Season 1
- Promotional photograph of the cast of Season 1 of New Zealand's Next Top Model
- Presented by: Sara Tetro
- Judges: Sara Tetro; Colin Mathura-Jeffree; Chris Sisarich
- No. of episodes: 13

Release
- Original network: TV3
- Original release: 13 March – 5 June 2009

Season chronology
- Next → Season 2

New Zealand's Next Top Model, Season 1 is the first season of New Zealand's Next Top Model, a reality TV show based on America's Next Top Model. This season aired on TV3 in New Zealand and FOX8 in Australia. It was hosted by Colin Mathura-Jeffree, Sara Tetro, and Chris Sisarich.

Thirteen young women competed for the title and a chance to start their career in the modeling industry. The prize was a contract with 62 Model Management, a 1-year contract with CoverGirl cosmetics, an 8-page editorial in CLEO Magazine, an all expenses paid trip to Sydney to meet with Ursula Hufnagl of Chic Model Management and a trip to New York to meet with NEXT Model Management.

The international destinations for this season were Sydney, Australia, where the final seven judging panel was held, and then Los Angeles, United States for one episode with six contestants.

The winner was 16-year-old Christobelle Grierson-Ryrie from Auckland, New Zealand. After the show was broadcast, Grierson-Ryrie criticised the editing of the series, stating it differed from her experience of the show.

== Contestants ==
(ages stated are at start of contest)

Name	Age	Height	Hometown	Finish	Place
Tiffany Butler	17	171 cm (5 ft 7 1/2 in)	Rotorua	Episode 2	13
Sarah Yearbury	19	180 cm (5 ft 11 in)	Christchurch	Episode 3	12
Olivia Murphy	19	173 cm (5 ft 8 in)	Dunedin	Episode 4	11
Rhiannon Lawrence	16	180 cm (5 ft 11 in)	Blenheim	Episode 5	10
Ajoh Chol	22	179 cm (5 ft 10 1/2 in)	Auckland	Episode 6	9
Rebecca-Rose Harvey	19	175 cm (5 ft 9 in)	Auckland	Episode 8	8
Lucy Murphy	22	170 cm (5 ft 7 in)	Dunedin	Episode 9	7
Teryl-Leigh Bourke	23	180 cm (5 ft 11 in)	Auckland	Episode 10	6
Victoria Williams	21	174 cm (5 ft 8 1/2 in)	Blenheim	Episode 11	5
Ruby Higgins	17	178 cm (5 ft 10 in)	Hastings	Episode 12	4
Hosanna Horsfall	19	170 cm (5 ft 7 in)	Gisborne	Episode 13	3
Laura Scaife	20	177 cm (5 ft 9 1/2 in)	Rotorua	Episode 13	2
Christobelle Grierson-Ryrie	16	175 cm (5 ft 9 in)	Auckland	Episode 13	1

== Episodes ==
=== Episode 1: (Casting) ===
Original Airdate: 13 March 2009

The 33 contestants are told via home video to pack their bags and go to Queenstown. There they meet model and judge Colin Mathura Jeffree, who introduces them to special guest Angela Dunn. The girls strut on an impromptu runway.

The next day, all 33 contestants head to the lake for a photo shoot in swimsuits. The number of contestants is reduced from 33 to 13. The top 13 contestants then move into the top model house in Auckland.

- Featured Photographer: Monty Adams
- Special Guest: Angela Dunn

=== Episode 2: The Girls Fly High ===
Original Airdate: 20 March 2009

The contestants complete their first challenge with Colin. The girls have to pose in a wind tunnel in 60 km wind. The second challenge involves putting together a model look at a Max Store in five minutes. The winner will get an exclusive Max Merino Ad Campaign shown all over New Zealand. Teryl-Leigh comes out as the winner. She selects Ajoh and Sarah to share her prize.

The contestants go to their first photo shoot, which is an homage to a New Zealand aviation great, Jean Batten. The girls had to embody a 1930s aviatrix on a plane.

At judging, the prizes include an 8-page editorial spread in Cleo, a CoverGirl cosmetics contract, and New Zealand representation with Sara Tetro's agency, 62 Models. The prize also includes a trip to Sydney and New York to meet with top agencies there. Teryl-Leigh gets the first call out; Hosanna and Tiffany end up in the bottom two. Hosanna is given a second chance and Tiffany was the first girl eliminated.

- First Call-Out: Teryl-Leigh Bourke
- Bottom Two: Hosanna Horsfall & Tiffany Butler
- Eliminated: Tiffany Butler
- Featured Photographer: Jackie Meiring
- Special Guest: Stacy Gregg (Editor-at-Large of New Zealand's Fashion Quarterly magazine)

=== Episode 3: The Girls Take The Streets ===
Original Airdate: 27 March 2009

The remaining 12 contestants visit a hip hop studio and get a lesson from hip hop dance group, Urban Beat. All the girls feel uncomfortable and awkward, especially Sarah who leaves and refuses to participate. Laura impresses Colin with her effort and participation.

The contestants partake in a rooftop hip hop inspired runway show in front of Colin and guest judge Angela Dunn. Christobelle, Teryl-Leigh and Sarah were praised for their performance and for following the brief of the challenge, which was to strike three hip hop poses at the end of the runway, while the rest got carried away and danced on the runway.

The contestants go to SnowPlanet for their photo shoot to test their stamina and ability to translate their personality into a photograph. Laura, Victoria, Rebecca-Rose, Christobelle and Hosanna impressed the photographer while Ruby's attitude at the photoshoot was questioned. Olivia struggled while Sarah refused to do the photoshoot because of a headache.

At panel, Sarah and Olivia end up in the bottom two but Sarah's unreliability sends her home.

- First Call-Out: Christobelle Grierson-Ryrie
- Bottom Two: Olivia Murphy & Sarah Yearbury
- Eliminated: Sarah Yearbury
- Featured Photographer: Craig Owen
- Special Guests: Angela Dunn and Urban Beat Dancers

=== Episode 4: The Girls Get Transformed ===
Original Airdate: 3 April 2009

The contestants receive makeovers at a Newmarket Salon.

The challenge takes the girls to Kelly Tarlton's Sea Life Aquarium where they have to showcase Australian fashion designer Kirrily Johnston's latest designs. Teryl-Leigh offends the designer saying she doesn't know what she's wearing whilst Laura describes her outfit as comfortable, making Colin laugh at her unprofessionalism.

At the photoshoot, the girls are turned into underwater creatures and pose in a beauty shot. Chris is impressed with most of the girls who embrace their new looks well but is disappointed with Olivia, Teryl-Leigh and Rhiannon.

During judging, Olivia and Teryl-Leigh end up in the bottom two, but Teryl-Leigh is spared and Olivia is sent home for her weak photos and inability to showcase her beauty on set.

- First Call-Out: Rebecca-Rose Harvey
- Bottom Two: Olivia Murphy & Teryl-Leigh Bourke
- Eliminated: Olivia Murphy
- Featured Photographer: Hannah Richards
- Special Guests: Kirrily Johnston and Paul Serville

=== Episode 5: The Girls Pose in Haute Couture ===
Original Airdate: 10 April 2009

The show opens with the contestants recalling the elimination of the previous episode. Lucy's struck by the fact she's truly in this competition alone now and Teryl-Leigh realises she can't keep coasting and needs to step it up if she wants to stay in the competition.

Sara stops by the house for a visit and a game of "most potential/least potential". Christobelle and Ajoh turn out to be early favourites, as lots of girls pick them to be in the top two. Teryl-Leigh turns out to be everyone's favourite to go, which really surprises her.

The challenge this week is a five-minute make-up challenge. The judges like some of the girls' make-up, and declare Ruby the winner. Her prize is exclusive make-up products and a one-on-one session with a professional make-up artist.

At panel, the judges are impressed with Christobelle, Hosanna, and Ajoh, they are mixed about Laura, Teryl-Leigh, Rebecca Rose, Victoria and Ruby, and are disappointed with Lucy & Rhiannon. In the end, Ajoh's improvements put her on top and Victoria and Rhiannon are on the bottom. The judges send Rhiannon home.

- First Call-Out: Ajoh Chol
- Bottom Two: Rhiannon Lawrence & Victoria Williams
- Eliminated: Rhiannon Lawrence
- Featured Photographer: Karen Inderbitzen-Waller
- Special Guests: Stefan Knight and Chris Kennedy-Grant

=== Episode 6: The Girls Are Diamonds in the Rough ===
Original Airdate: 17 April 2009

The remaining contestants are tested on their poise and grace when they are asked to pose on gymnastic items. Ajoh refuses to participate because she claims that in her culture it is not okay for girls to open up their legs wide apart. The winner of this challenge is Laura.

For this week's photoshoot, the girls are asked to do a commercial photo for Michael Hill Jeweller in a car and wearing a Michael Hill watch.

At the judging panel, the judges praise Laura's shot as well as Teryl-Leigh & Victoria, and say that Lucy's shot looks like a mannequin. In the end, Rebecca-Rose and Ajoh land in the bottom two, which shocks Sara as they were both front-runners in the competition. However, Rebecca-Rose is spared and Ajoh is sent home.

- First Call-Out: Laura Scaife
- Bottom Two: Ajoh Chol & Rebecca-Rose Harvey
- Eliminated: Ajoh Chol
- Featured Photographer: Jackie Meiring
- Special Guest: Ngahuia Williams, Makaia Carr and Pieter Stewart

=== Episode 7: Cycle One Rewind (Recap) ===
Original Airdate: 24 April 2009

A recap on the first season of the show, looking over the journey's each of the 8 contestants remaining have been through to make it this far into the competition including never before seen confessions, secrets, and arguments that happened in the first 6 weeks of the competition.

=== Episode 8: The Girls Get Dirty ===
Original Airdate: 1 May 2009

The contestants took part in a music video for the New Zealand band Autozamm. Dancing and acting was required of them. They first wore 1960's style dresses, then circus costumes. Rebecca-Rose was told to wear a leopard costume and Teryl-Leigh, a gorilla costume. Victoria was the leading lady who got to kiss one of the musicians at the end of the video.

The girls also practiced their VJ skills on the set of C4 with Jermaine Leef of the show Select. Ruby won the competition and her prize was to be a VJ on Monday with Jermaine.

The photoshoot was with boys from the Cleo Bachelor of the Year competition.

At panel, Christobelle, Ruby, and Laura are praised for their photos while Laura and Hosanna's clips get praised. However, the rest of the girls (Rebecca-Rose, Lucy, Teryl-Leigh, and Victoria) get highly criticised for their photos and clips in the music video. Rebecca-Rose and Lucy end up in the bottom two, Rebecca-Rose for not living up to her high fashion potential and Lucy for her almost too commercial appeal, and Lucy is ultimately saved and Rebecca-Rose, one of the former front runners, is sent home.

- First Call-Out: Laura Scaife
- Bottom Two: Lucy Murphy & Rebecca-Rose Harvey
- Eliminated: Rebecca-Rose Harvey
- Featured Photographer: Russ Flatt
- Special Guests: Ed Davis, AutoZaam, Shelley Ferguson, Jaquie Brown and Jermaine Leef

=== Episode 9: The Girls Go Down Under ===
Original Airdate: 8 May 2009

Each contestant was paired with a student designer, whose task it was to create an outfit out of secondhand clothes for less than $40. The girls then modelled their outfit down a catwalk. There were two winners of the challenge for this week: Ruby and Christobelle. They were treated to a spa visit.

For their photoshoot, this week the girls were asked to portray an emotion. The emotion was to replace the often-seen cigarette that featured in photos and in film in the circa 1950s era.

Contestant	Emotion
Christobelle	Anger
Hosanna	Fear
Laura	Grief
Lucy	Despair
Ruby	Joy
Teryl Leigh	Surprise
Victoria	Lust

The contestants travel to Sydney, Australia for the elimination. Here they were told that Australia was merely a pit-stop; the remaining girls would travel on to Los Angeles. Most of the girls photo's were praised especially Ruby, Laura & Victoria but Lucy had the weakest photo. Lucy and Hosanna were in the bottom two. The wink which Hosanna gave at the end of her catwalk did not go down well with Sara and she was called out for being too fake. Lucy's photo was given negative feedback. Lucy was eliminated.

- First Call-Out: Ruby Higgins
- Bottom Two: Hosanna Horsfall & Lucy Murphy
- Eliminated: Lucy Murphy
- Featured Photographer: Craig Owen
- Special Guests: Abby, Scott, Celine , April, Jeremy, Ivana, Priyanka and Morgan McGlone

=== Episode 10: The Girls Hit The Runway To L.A ===
Original Airdate: 15 May 2009

The 6 remaining contestants arrive in Los Angeles. They go to the Los Angeles Division of NEXT Model Management to meet with manager, Alexis Borges. He gives the girls advice - Hosanna is too short for the agency hence they would not accept her; Victoria is considered ordinary; Teryl-Leigh and Ruby need to lose weight if they want a high fashion career; Christobelle is wearing too much makeup, and Laura is to work on her posture. At breakfast the next morning, Teryl-Leigh makes a healthy choice and eats wedges instead of chips.

The girls then arrive at Los Angeles Fashion District. They have US$75 and thirty minutes to buy an entire outfit. Christobelle and Victoria were late and disqualified. Teryl-Leigh, Christobelle and Victoria have to spend time in a fish tank at their hotel for 3 hours, while making it look like fashion. The challenge this week was a CoverGirl commercial advertising TruBlend Makeup Collection. Christobelle won the challenge and picked Ruby and Teryl-Leigh to share her prize to go on more sight seeing at night in L.A.

The photoshoot is a high fashion shoot under the Santa Monica Pier. The girls are surprised that their photographer is Nigel Barker.

At panel, Hosanna breaks down because her craziness and overexaggerated poses dampened both the photoshoot and the commercial, although she did still have a great photo. Victoria produces an amazing photo and Nigel commented that she has a face that can work on an international level. Laura and Christobelle impress the judges and especially Nigel Barker. Teryl-Leigh's photo was depressing and sad and Ruby just had a mediocre photo that didn't do her body justice. Christobelle was called first and Teryl-Leigh and Hosanna land in the bottom two and Teryl-Leigh is eliminated much to the girls' surprise.

- First Call-Out: Christobelle Grierson-Ryrie
- Bottom Two: Hosanna Horsfall & Teryl-Leigh Bourke
- Eliminated: Teryl-Leigh Bourke
- Commercial Director: Michael Mihail
- Featured Photographer: Nigel Barker
- Special Guests: Chris Kennedy-Grant and Alexis Borges

=== Episode 11: The Girls Go See The City ===
Original Airdate: 22 May 2009

The 5 contestants return from Los Angeles and meet with Colin and New Zealand model, Nikki Phillips at Vodafone, where they find out they are doing "go sees". The girls meet with New Zealand's top designers such as Huffer, Trelise Cooper and Zambesi. Laura, Christobelle, Hosanna and Ruby made it back in time but Victoria turns up an hour late and is disqualified. Hosanna wins the challenge and Laura is shocked because she thought she was going to win.

The girls' photoshoot was inspired by 80's Glamour Elite Socialites on Michael Hill's very impressive yacht. Chris Sisarich photographs the final 5. Christobelle, Ruby and Hosanna really captured the idea and impressed while Laura fails and Victoria over-thought her poses which disappointed Chris.

At panel, Hosanna and Christobelle are praised for their photographs while Laura is said to have had a bad week. Hosanna gets first call out; Ruby and Victoria lands in the bottom two, Victoria because she didn't embody the personality for the photoshoot and not getting booked for any go sees. And Ruby, because the judges felt that she was cruising through the competition and then disappointed at go sees. Ultimately, Victoria is sent home because of her inconsistency.

- First Call-Out: Hosanna Horsfall
- Bottom Two: Ruby Higgins & Victoria Williams
- Eliminated: Victoria Williams
- Featured Photographer: Chris Sisarich
- Special Guests: Nikki Phillips, Trelise Cooper, Anna Fitzpatrick, Murray Bevan, Marissa Findlay, Dan Buckley, Yvonne Benetti, Steve Dunstan and Atip

=== Episode 12: The Girls Get Ready To Rumble ===
Original Airdate: 29 May 2009

The contestants get a chance to meet Wendell, a former gossip columnist. She interviews them and asks tough questions, asking about Laura's DUI, Hosanna's sports star past, Christobelle's attitude and Ruby's weight before giving them feedback as to how they could have dealt with that better.

After that, the girls think they are getting a special treat at a spa. But there's a surprise twist because after the pampering, the girls learn they need to become spokesmodels for one of the products that was just used on them. Christobelle is declared the winner. As her prize, she receives a year's supply of Nivea products and an advertorial in Women's Day.

This week's photo shoot was boxing themed and the girls took turns in the ring. At panel, the photos are all praised. Laura's photo puts her as called first. Hosanna is second and the bottom two are Christobelle - for her weak photo - and Ruby - for her weight. In the end, Christobelle's stronger overall performance keeps her in the competition.

- First Call-Out: Laura Scaife
- Bottom Two: Christobelle Grierson-Ryrie & Ruby Higgins
- Eliminated: Ruby Higgins
- Featured Photographer: Craig Owen
- Special Guests: Wendell Nissen, Merilyn Havler, Atip and Monty Betham

=== Episode 13: The Girl Who Becomes New Zealand's Next Top Model ===
Original Airdate: 5 June 2009

The final three contestants complete three different photoshoots each for Cleo Magazine. The winner's shots will appear in an 8-page editorial in Cleo Magazine after the show ends. Chris and Colin are both impressed with all the girls and how much they've grown since the start of the competition.

At the first judging, the girls are asked to tell the judges who they think should win and who should go with each contestant choosing themselves as the winner. Laura and Christobelle singled out Hosanna as the one that should leave and Hosanna told the judges that Laura should be sent home. In the end, it is Hosanna who is sent home and Christobelle and Laura are the final two.

- First Call-Out: Christobelle Grierson-Ryrie
- Bottom Two: Hosanna Horsfall & Laura Scaife
- Eliminated: Hosanna Horsfall
- Featured Photographer: Monty Adams

The final two do a runway show in front of some of the best of the industry and are surprised to see some of the eliminated contestants who will walk the runway with them. During the runway, Laura has a small slip but recovers well and is complimented by the judges on this.

The judges look over both girls portfolios and overall improvement before the girls come back into the judging room and Christobelle is announced as New Zealand's Next Top Model.

- Special Guests: Shelley Ferguson, Trelise Cooper
- Featured Models in Fashion Show: Sarah Yearbury, Ajoh Chol, Rebecca-Rose Harvey, Lucy Murphy, Teryl Leigh Bourke, Ruby Higgins and Hosanna Horsfall
- Designer: Mix of NZ/International Designers
- Final Two: Christobelle Grierson-Ryrie & Laura Scaife
- New Zealand's Next Top Model: Christobelle Grierson-Ryrie

== Call-out order ==
Order	Episodes												
Order	1	2	3	4	5	6	8	9	10	11	12	13	13
1	Tiffany	Teryl-Leigh	Christobelle	Rebecca-Rose	Ajoh	Laura	Laura	Ruby	Christobelle	Hosanna	Laura	Christobelle	Christobelle
2	Victoria	Ruby	Hosanna	Christobelle	Ruby	Victoria	Ruby	Victoria	Laura	Christobelle	Hosanna	Laura	Laura
3	Christobelle	Laura	Teryl-Leigh	Ajoh	Christobelle	Lucy	Christobelle	Laura	Victoria	Laura	Christobelle	Hosanna	
4	Ajoh	Lucy	Lucy	Rhiannon	Hosanna	Teryl-Leigh	Hosanna	Christobelle	Ruby	Ruby	Ruby		
5	Rebecca-Rose	Rhiannon	Victoria	Ruby	Rebecca-Rose	Ruby	Victoria	Teryl-Leigh	Hosanna	Victoria			
6	Sarah	Sarah	Laura	Victoria	Teryl-Leigh	Hosanna	Teryl-Leigh	Hosanna	Teryl-Leigh				
7	Rhiannon	Christobelle	Rebecca-Rose	Hosanna	Laura	Christobelle	Lucy	Lucy					
8	Teryl-Leigh	Ajoh	Rhiannon	Laura	Lucy	Rebecca-Rose	Rebecca-Rose						
9	Ruby	Victoria	Ruby	Lucy	Victoria	Ajoh							
10	Olivia	Olivia	Ajoh	Teryl-Leigh	Rhiannon								
11	Laura	Rebecca-Rose	Olivia	Olivia									
12	Lucy	Hosanna	Sarah										
13	Hosanna	Tiffany											

The contestant won the challenge
The contestant was eliminated
The contestant won the competition

- In episode 1, the pool of 20 girls was reduced to 13 who moved on to the main competition. However, this first call-out does not reflect their performance that first week.
- Episode 7 is the recap episode

=== Average call-out order ===
Final two is not included.

Rank by average	Place	Model	Call-out total	Number of call-outs	Call-out average
1	1	Christobelle	34	11	3.09
2	2	Laura	37	11	3.36
3	4	Ruby	38	10	3.80
4	3	Hosanna	52	11	4.73
5	5	Victoria	46	9	5.11
6	6	Teryl-Leigh	41	8	5.13
7	7	Lucy	42	7	6.00
8	9	Ajoh	31	5	6.20
9	8	Rebecca-Rose	40	6	6.67
10	10	Rhiannon	27	4	6.75
11	12	Sarah	18	2	9.00
12	11	Olivia	32	3	10.67
13	13	Tiffany	13	1	13.00

=== Bottom two ===
Episode	Contestants	Eliminated
2	Hosanna & Tiffany	Tiffany
3	Olivia & Sarah	Sarah
4	Olivia & Teryl-Leigh	Olivia
5	Rhiannon & Victoria	Rhiannon
6	Ajoh & Rebecca-Rose	Ajoh
8	Lucy & Rebecca-Rose	Rebecca-Rose
9	Hosanna & Lucy	Lucy
10	Hosanna & Teryl-leigh	Teryl-Leigh
11	Ruby & Victoria	Victoria
12	Christobelle & Ruby	Ruby
13	Hosanna & Laura	Hosanna
13	Christobelle & Laura	Laura

The contestant was eliminated after her first time in the bottom two
The contestant was eliminated after her second time in the bottom two
The contestant was eliminated after their fourth time in the bottom two
The contestant was placed as the runner-up in the final judging

== Photo Shoot Guide ==
- Episode 1 Photoshoot (Casting): Swimsuit in/by Lake
- Episode 2 Photoshoot: Jean Batten inspired Aviatrixes
- Episode 3 Photoshoot: Snow Editorial
- Episode 4 Photoshoot: Fantasy Beauty Shots
- Episode 5 Photoshoot: Haute Couture on Beach
- Episode 6 Photoshoot: Michael Hill Wristwatches in Car
- Episode 8 Music Video and Photoshoot: Autozamm Music Video / Sensual Pin Up Girls with Cleo magazine Bachelors
- Episode 9 Photoshoot: 30's Glamour Inspired Portraying Emotions
- Episode 10 Commercial & Photoshoot: CoverGirl TruBlend Foundation / Alluring High Fashion under Piers at Santa Monica Beach
- Episode 11 Photoshoot: 80's Inspired Elite Girls on a Yacht (Inspired by Calvin Klein S/S 09 Ad Campaigns)
- Episode 12 Commercial & Photoshoot: Nivea Visage Beauty / Boxing Shoot
- Episode 13 Photoshoot & Runway Show: Cleo magazine Editorial / New Zealand Fashion Designer Collaboration

== Makeovers ==
- Olivia: Trimmed and dyed platinum blonde
- Rhiannon: Shoulder length cut and dyed dark brown
- Ajoh: Cut short
- Rebecca Rose: Shoulder length cut and dyed red
- Lucy: Shoulder length cut and dyed chocolate brown
- Teryl-Leigh: Cut shorter and dyed copper red
- Victoria: Katie Holmes inspired layered bob cut and dyed dark brown
- Ruby: Trimmed, dyed blonde and eyebrows lightened
- Hosanna: Layered and dyed chocolate brown ala Eva Mendes
- Laura: Agyness Deyn inspired cut and dyed platinum blonde with bleached eyebrows
- Christobelle: Gisele Bündchen inspired blonde highlights
