= Nikki Phillips (model) =

New Zealand model, blogger, and television host

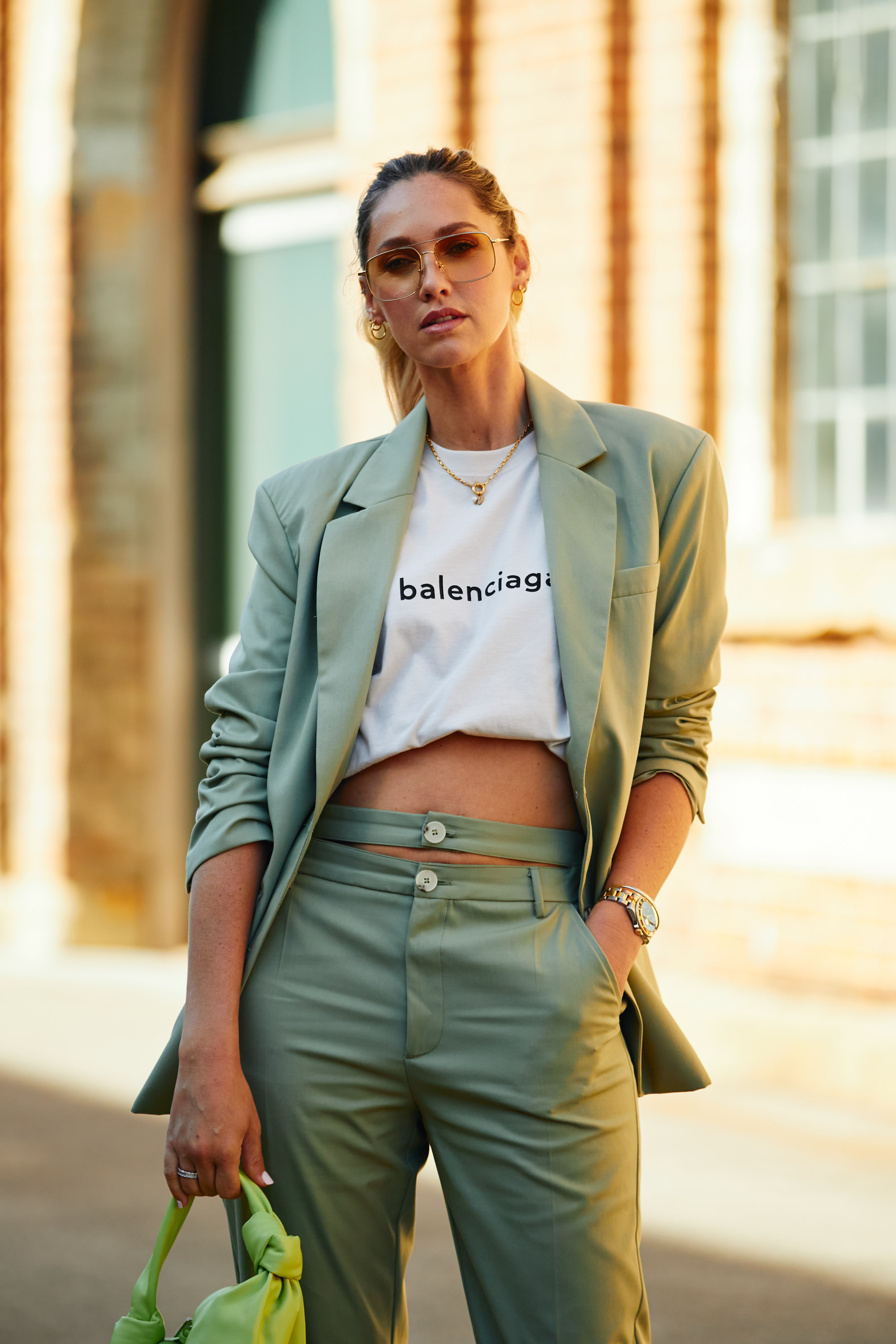
- Phillips at Australian Fashion Week 2021
- Born: 1983 (age 42–43); Auckland, New Zealand
- Occupation: Model
- Spouse: Dane Rumble (m. 2014)
- Modeling information
- Agency: London Mgt Group
- Website: bynikkiphillips.com

Nikki Phillips (born 1983) is a New Zealand model, blogger, and television host.

Phillips was born in Auckland. She started modelling at age 14 and moved to Australia in 2002. She appeared as a special guest judge in the first series of New Zealand's Next Top Model in 2009. In December 2015 she began hosting Garage Movie Block, a Sky Television show in New Zealand.

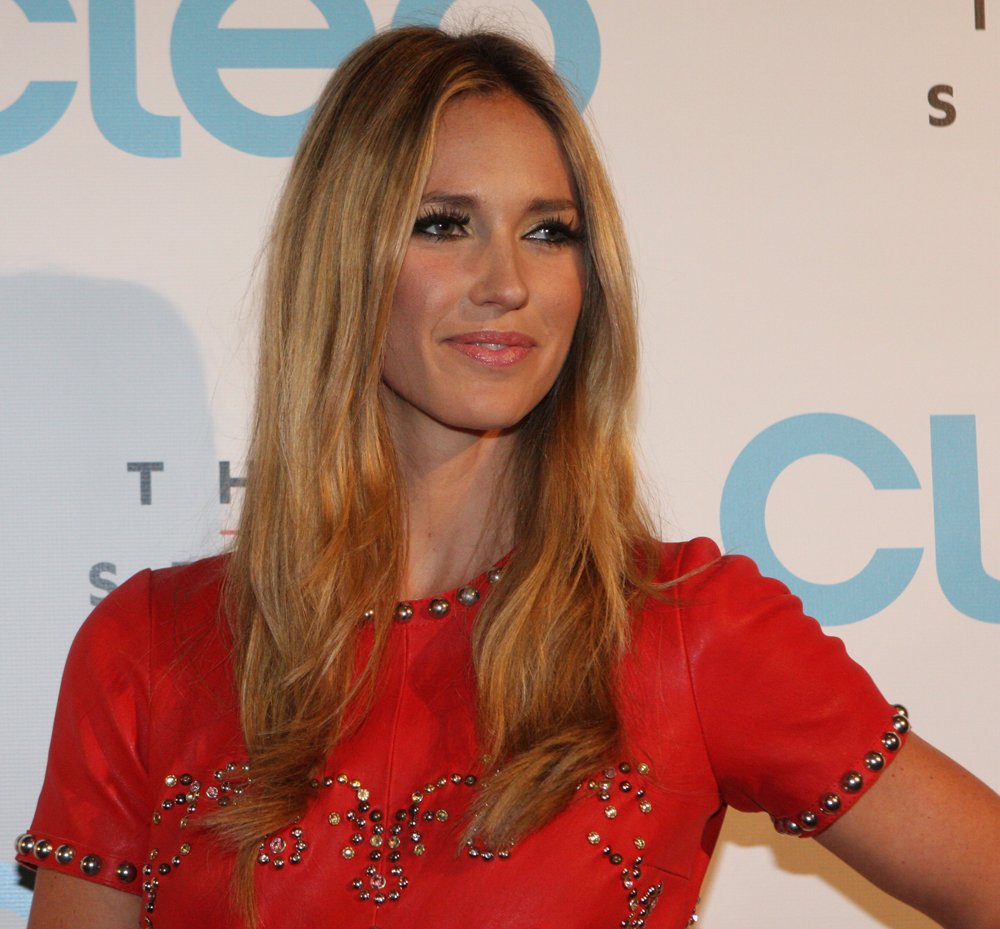
Phillips in 2013

Phillips married her husband Dane Rumble in Bali in 2014.
