= Christobelle Grierson-Ryrie =

New Zealand fashion model

- Born: 1992 (age 33–34); Auckland, New Zealand
- Modeling information
- Height: 5 ft 9 in (1.75 m)
- Hair color: Blonde
- Eye color: Blue
- Agency: 62 Models & Talent, Chic Management, NEXT Model Management

Christobelle Grierson-Ryrie, (born 1992) is a New Zealand former fashion model who won New Zealand's Next Top Model, Cycle 1 on 5 June 2009.

== Life ==
Grierson-Ryrie is the daughter of Auckland businesswoman Josephine Ann Grierson, and Kenyan-born businessman Bruce Ryrie. She is a descendant of Max Grierson, founder of law firm Simpson Grierson. The family resides in Devonport, Auckland. After winning the title of New Zealand's Next Top Model, Grierson-Ryrie returned to Auckland Diocesan School For Girls, as a year 13 student. Grierson-Ryrie said that she intended to finish school to keep her options open. After finishing school she studied in London, Edinburgh, and Paris.

=== New Zealand's Next Top Model ===
Grierson-Ryrie first came to notice as a contestant on New Zealand's Next Top Model, Cycle 1. Judges commented that she had an international look which would succeed in the industry. America's Next Top Model judge and photographer, Nigel Barker was impressed by her ability to move in photos and her unique look. She received a total of three first call-outs and four challenge wins, the most of any competitor, and landed in the bottom two only once. On the final runway the judges praised her for her effortless walk and ultimately she won the competition, making her the youngest winner at the age of 16.

Grierson-Ryrie's prizes included an eight-page feature in CLEO Magazine, a contract with CoverGirl cosmetics, representation by agency 62 Models, an all-expense-paid trip to Sydney, Australia, to meet Ursula Hufnagl of Chic Model Management, and a trip to New York City to meet NEXT Model Management. Grierson-Ryrie featured in a Nivea Visage Advertorial in Woman's Day magazine as part of her challenge win in Episode 12.

=== Model career ===
Grierson-Ryrie was signed with 62 Models in Auckland, Chic Management in Sydney and NEXT Model Management in New York in 2010. She did some work for Stolen Girlfriend's Club and walked the runway for Top NZ designer Trelise Cooper for New Zealand's Fashion Week.

She was the new face of the Pre-Fall Ed Hardy for Christian Audigier campaigns in 2009.
