= Jessica Serfaty =

American actress and model (born 1991)

- Born: Jessica Ann Michel; April 4, 1991 (age 35); Little Rock, Arkansas, U.S.
- Citizenship: United States
- Occupation: Actress
- Years active: 2010–present
- Known for: America's Next Top Model (cycle 14), Days of Our Lives
- Spouse: Ididia Serfaty (m. 2008; div. 2013)
- Partner: Logan Paul (2014–2017)
- Children: 1

Jessica Serfaty (born 1991) is an American actress and model.

== Personal life ==
Serfaty was born in 1991 in Little Rock, Arkansas. She married Ididia Serfaty, a property manager, at the age of 17, following an unexpected pregnancy. The couple first met at church. They have a son named Roman. Her pursuit of a modeling career led to a family move to Los Angeles, which eventually placed stress on her marriage, resulting in divorce.

After her divorce in 2013, Serfaty entered a relationship with YouTuber Logan Paul, which lasted from 2014 to 2017 and was reported as his longest relationship. She was briefly linked to Joe Jonas, with whom she spent Christmas 2015 in Las Vegas. Subsequently, Serfaty dated Niall Horan of One Direction throughout 2016.

In 2017, Serfaty began dating Ed Westwick, known from Gossip Girl. In April 2018, Serfarty posted two nude images on Instagram Stories with a caption referencing intimate relationship with the photographer, Brooklyn Beckham. She quickly deleted the posts, then re-uploaded them without captions. This occurred shortly after Beckham shared black-and-white photographs of Serfarty, which she also posted on her own profile. Serfaty got engaged to Kaan Gunay, founder of Firefly, in 2019. The couple separated in 2022.

Serfaty was engaged to billionaire Leonardo Maria Del Vecchio, the chief strategy officer of EssilorLuxottica, from 2023 to 2024. The couple met at the Cannes Film Festival in 2017 and reconnected years later. Del Vecchio proposed with a yellow diamond on Italy's Amalfi Coast, as reported by Parade. On July 21, 2024, Serfaty accused Del Vecchio of physical assault in a social media video. The following day, she issued a statement apologizing for any distress caused and stated that the disagreement was a private family matter. In August 2024, Serfaty claimed to the police that she discovered an AirTag hidden in her car, which was allegedly installed by someone to track her. When the police searched the vehicle, they were unable to find the AirTag and found the claim invalid.

== Career ==
Serfaty was discovered by a modeling agent at a mall but was initially considered too young to be hired.

Serfaty gained initial prominence as a contestant on Season 14 of America's Next Top Model, hosted by Tyra Banks. She was eliminated in the 10th episode of America's Next Top Model due to her look being deemed "too commercial." In the episode prior to her elimination, she inadvertently started a fire by burning a taco in a toaster and attempting to extinguish it with a wet rag.

Later, Serfaty joined Next Model Management in Los Angeles and participated in advertising campaigns for McDonald's and Toyota. She also appeared in the music video for "Highway Don't Care," a pop-country hit by Taylor Swift, Tim McGraw, and Keith Urban.

== Filmography ==
- Ryde (2017)
- Days of Our Lives (2022-2024)
