= New Zealand's Next Top Model =

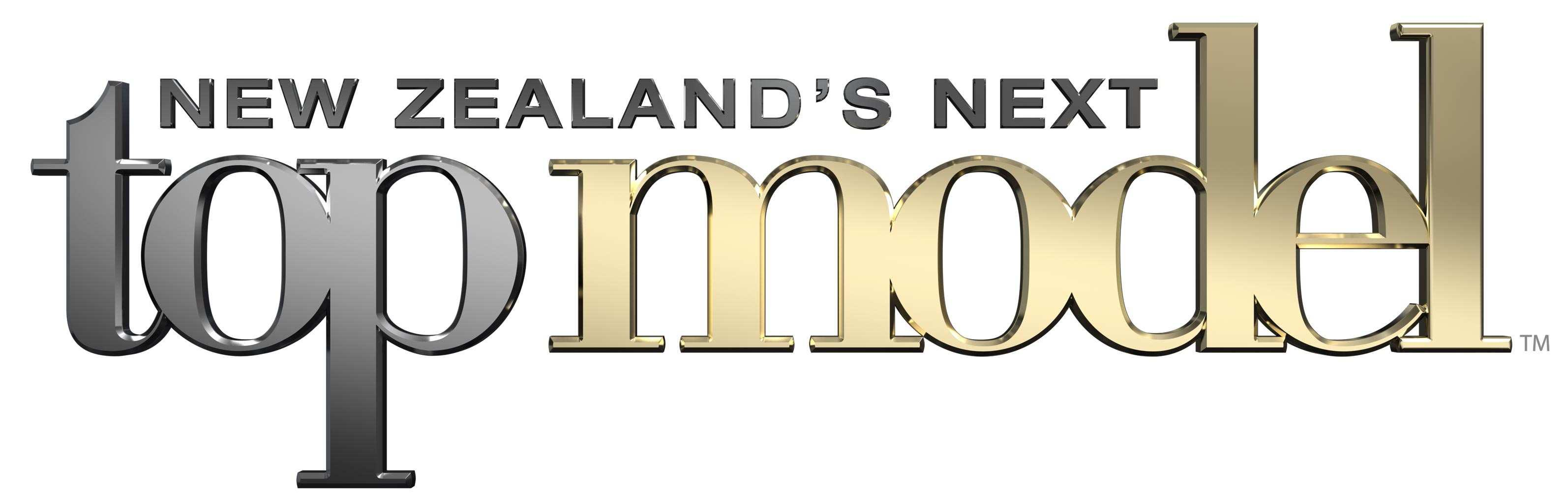
- Created by: Tyra Banks
- Presented by: Sara Tetro
- Judges: Sara Tetro; Colin Mathura-Jeffree; Chris Sisarich
- Theme music composer: David Thomas & Les Pierce
- Opening theme: Models, The Fanatics
- Country of origin: New Zealand
- Original language: English
- No. of seasons: 3
- No. of episodes: 39

Production
- Running time: 60 minutes (44 without commercials)

Original release
- Network: TV3
- Release: 13 March 2009 – 2 September 2011

New Zealand's Next Top Model (NZNTM) is a New Zealand reality television series in which a number of young women compete for the title of New Zealand's Next Top Model and the chance to start their career in the modeling industry.

The show's format was originally created by American talk-show host and model Tyra Banks.

The New Zealand series is hosted by former model and 62 Models Management founder Sara Tetro, and airs on TV3 NZ. The winner of NZNTM wins a modelling contract with Sara's agency. Like its American counterpart, NZNTM features a photographer and international model on its judging panel, Chris Sisarich and Colin Mathura-Jeffree, respectively. Mathura-Jeffree also acts as runway coach to the girls, much like Miss Jay on America's Next Top Model.

== Premise ==
A group of young women live in a house together and compete for a modeling contract and the title of New Zealand's Next Top Model. Each week, the girls participate in a challenge and a photo shoot, after which one of them is sent home. The show is based on the hit American TV series America's Next Top Model, which was created/produced and hosted by television personality and former model and talk show host Tyra Banks. The show started in America in 2003, to early commercial success and was first viewed on New Zealand television screens in late 2004. Unlike the age range of America's Next Top Model where the age range is between 18 - 27, the New Zealand version, which targets a younger audience has a lower age range of 16 - 23.

== Reception ==
New Zealand's Next Top Model was a ratings success in New Zealand. Season 1 secured a higher rating than America's Next Top Model on the TV3 network. Season 1 has also finished airing in Australia on the FOX8 network with similar success, becoming one of the 10 most popular shows on subscription television in Australia and at times out-rating FOX8's heavily promoted Australian version of The Contender. Season 2 was aired on Australian TV channel Eleven.

== Controversy ==
In the third episode of series two, the show faced controversy when 16-year-old Michaela Steenkamp modeled topless at a tribal swamp photo shoot. Steenkamp, a devout Christian, said in testimonials aired alongside shots of her half naked in the mud that she was deeply uncomfortable with the shoot. After the episode aired, fans raised concerns about the appropriateness of such a young contestant being shown topless. The show replaced the original photograph of Steenkamp on their website, where one could see her breasts clearly—covered with a bit of nipple tape and nothing else—with a newly Photoshopped image with fog covering Steenkamp's upper body. Digital "fog" was also added to older contestant Amelia's photograph - like Michaela, Amelia originally posed with nothing but nipple tape. At the same photo shoot, other contestants wore nude-colored bandeau tops.

In season three it was revealed that finalist Rosanagh Wypych had a criminal conviction for drink-driving. In the week before the final it was revealed that she had failed to disclose a second conviction, for driving whilst disqualified, that had resulted in a second court appearance and conviction before the show started. Contestants are required to declare convictions before entering the reality TV competition show. Several days later she uploaded photos to her Facebook page where she had nearly 4,000 friends, some as young as 11. The pictures show Wypych, 17, and friends drinking alcohol and one photo with her next to another girl holding what looks like cannabis. In a statement to 3 News, Wypych states "I understand that what I have done has jeopardised my place in the competition and I am worried now that any day now the judges can decide to kick me out if they wanted to." Despite this she was the runner up with Bianca Cutts-Karaman to Brigette Thomas.

== Judges ==
Judge/Mentor	Cycle		
Judge/Mentor	1 (2009)	2 (2010)	3 (2011)
Hosts
Sara Tetro	Head Judge	Head Judge	Head Judge
Judging Panelists
Colin Mathura-Jeffree	Main	Main	Main
Chris Sisarich	Main	Main	Main

== Cycles ==
Cycle	Premiere date	Winner	Runner-up	Other contestants in order of elimination	Number of contestants	International Destinations
1	13 March 2009	Christobelle Grierson-Ryrie	Laura Scaife	Tiffany Butler, Sarah Yearbury, Olivia Murphy, Rhiannon Lawrence, Ajoh Chol, Rebecca-Rose Harvey, Lucy Murphy, Teryl-Leigh Bourke, Victoria Williams, Ruby Higgins, Hosanna Horsfall	13	Sydney; Los Angeles
2	6 August 2010	Danielle Hayes	Michaela Steenkamp	Estelle Curd, Jamie Himiona, Aafreen Vaz, Amelia Nakagawa Gough, Eva Duncan & Lauren Bangs, Holly Potton, Nellie Jenkins, Lara Kingsbeer, Dakota Biddle, Courtenay Scott-Hill, Elza Jenkins	14	Phuket
3	10 June 2011	Brigette Thomas	Bianca Cutts-Karaman & Rosanagh Wypych	Aminah Mohamed, Holly Reid, Yanna Hampe, Briana Allen, Amber Douglas, Tyne Aitken, Arihana Taiaroa, Aroha Newby, Hillary Cross, A.J. Moore, Issy Thorpe	14	Abu Dhabi
