= Nigel Barker (photographer) =

English TV show personality, author, and filmmaker

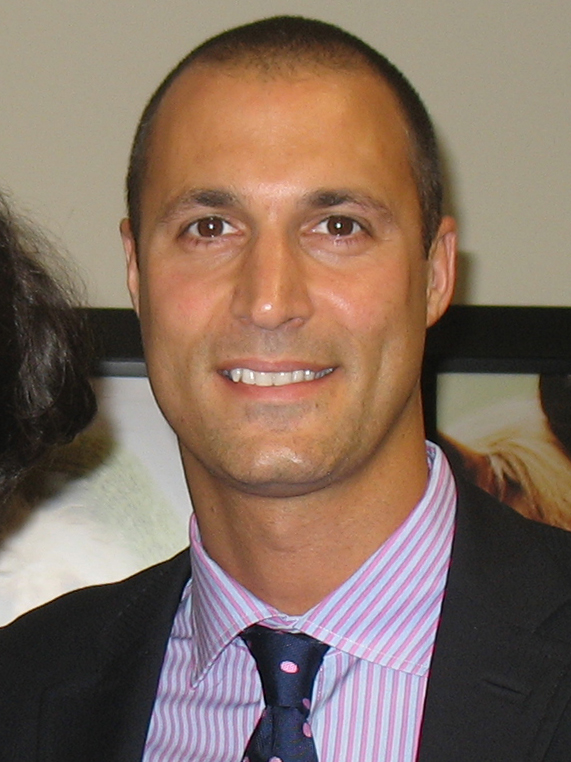
- Barker in 2008
- Born: 27 April 1972 (age 54); London, England
- Occupations: Fashion photographer, author, spokesperson, judge, filmmaker, former model
- Spouse: Cristen Barker (m. 1999)
- Children: 2
- Website: http://www.nigelbarker.tv/

Nigel Barker (born 27 April 1972) is an English reality TV show personality, fashion photographer, author, spokesperson, filmmaker, and former model. He is best known for his participation as a judge and photographer on the reality show America's Next Top Model, and was the host of reality show The Face for the American series.

In 2026, he appeared in the Netflix documentary, Reality Check: Inside America's Next Top Model.

== Early life ==
Barker was born in London. His mother, who is Sri Lankan, was a former Miss Sri Lanka contestant before immigrating to the United Kingdom. She played a significant role in forming his respect for the modeling profession as he grew up, and has stated that she used her success in modelling to bring her family to the United Kingdom. Barker grew up in a family with five siblings from a total of three marriages, and lived there until he was 18. He attended Bryanston School, a boarding school, where he took his A-levels in biology, chemistry, and physics.

== Career ==
Barker planned to continue his studies in medicine, but his mother entered him into a televised model search on The Clothes Show. He was a finalist on the show, which started his modeling career. He modeled for around 10 years in London, Milan, Paris and New York City. As a young model, he observed that the fashion industry was changing—that "models were shrinking and a 6’4" well-built male model was not selling". In 1996, he transitioned himself from model to fashion photographer.

Barker opened a photo studio, StudioNB, in Manhattan's now fashionable Meatpacking District. He has shot editorials for GQ, Interview, Seventeen, Town & Country, Lucky, Tatler, and Cover, and advertising campaigns for Land's End, Leviev, Nicole Miller, Nine West, Ted Baker, Jordache, Pamella Rolland, Beefeater, Ford, and Sony.

Barker was a judge for 17 cycles on Tyra Banks's reality show America's Next Top Model. Barker expresses that after his post on the reality competition's judging panel, he'll have more time to focus on other ventures, including a cosmetics line, skincare line for men and a return to TV. He was also a judge for the 2007 Miss America Pageant and the 2012 Miss Universe Pageant. He is executive producer of the VH1 photography-based reality contest The Shot. In 2013 Barker became the host of The Face.

Barker made special appearances as a photographer on the third cycle of Canada's Next Top Model and in Episode 10 of the first cycle of New Zealand's Next Top Model. He appeared as guest judge and photographer on the first cycle of Mexico's Next Top Model, and made a guest appearance on the second cycle of Benelux' Next Top Model.

His directorial debut was a documentary that he also produced called A Sealed Fate?. It was followed by Generation Free and Haiti: Hunger and Hope, which partner with The Humane Society of the United States, the Elizabeth Glaser Pediatric AIDS Foundation and the Edeyo Foundation to highlight their respective issues. Barker is also a celebrity ambassador for the Make-A-Wish Foundation, Do Something, The United Nation Foundation's Girl Up initiative, and a campaign shooter for Fashion Targets Breast Cancer.

Barker is a spokesperson for prominent brands, including Microsoft, Sony, Crest White Strips and Nine West. He appeared alongside Justin Timberlake and Peyton Manning in Sony's 2010 national ad campaign. He has done television and feature film cameos, event hosting and presenting. Barker appeared as a celebrity judge for the 2008 Miss America Pageant and had cameo roles on several TV series, including The Young and the Restless, Privileged, Stylista, Style Her Famous and Ugly Betty, as well as a cameo role in the feature film Arthur (2011), with Jennifer Garner, Russell Brand, Nick Nolte and Helen Mirren. He has hosted and presented at many events including the 2007, 2008 and 2010 Emmy awards on Fox Broadcasting Company, the 2008 and 2009 Go Green galas in New York City, the Genesis Awards and the 2010 Global Fashion Awards. In 2017 Barker became New Zealand winery Invivo's official "glambassador". Barker published a book on beauty, Nigel Barker's Beauty Equation: Revealing a Better and More Beautiful You, released September 2010 from Abrams Image.

In 2009 Barker opened a photography exhibit, Haiti: Hunger and Hope, at the Milk Gallery in New York City. His work in Haiti earned him a Do Something with Style Award nomination from the VH1 Do Something Awards. The awards show, produced by Vh1, is organised by Do Something, an organization for young people.

Barker teamed up with Taylor Swift to shoot a photobook of her titled 8 hours which made its debut in November 2012. In September 2013 Barker shot Nadia Lacka, Liliane Ferrarezi, Jordan & Zac Stenmark in 'Bedtime Stories' featured in the September issue of Numero Russia.

In 2016 he was one of the guest judges in the final of Miss USA 2016 in T-Mobile Arena, Las Vegas, Nevada, United States. Also in 2016 Barker teamed up with Adorama on a new web series, "Top Photographer", which drew its inspiration from "Top Model". The season's winner was Academy of Art University alumni Scott Borrero.

In 2017, 2018 and 2019 he joined Holland's Next Top Model (cycles 10–12) as a judge. In 2018 he joined the judging panel for the first season of Curvy Supermodel, the spin-off of Holland's Next Top Model.

== Personal life ==
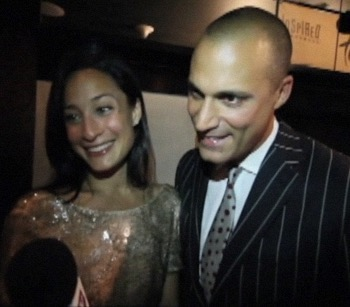
Barker and Chin in 2016

Barker is married to Cristen Chin, a model and CoverGirl representative since 1999. The couple lives in New York City with their two children.
