= Sara Tetro =

New Zealand presenter and model

- Born: Sara Danielle Tetro; Auckland, New Zealand
- Occupations: Model; Television host, Actress, Businesswoman
- Years active: 1991–present
- Height: 5 ft 10 in (1.78 m)

Sara Tetro is a former New Zealand model, television host, actress, and entrepreneur. She owns the model casting agency 62 Models Management, and is the host of the TV3 NZ reality series New Zealand's Next Top Model.

== Early life ==
Tetro's father was a well-known Jewish general practitioner, Gabriel Tetro, and her mother Sally was a full-time caregiver for her family. She attended Auckland Technical Institute before entering the modelling industry, following encouragement from her father.

== Career ==
=== Modelling ===
Tetro is a former model who worked for local agent Maysie Bestall-Cohen. After five years of modelling, she became a casting agent and started her own modelling company "62 Models" in 1994. She then bought the casting agency "The People Shop", with clients including Hayley Holt, Marc Ellis, Temepara George, Wendy Petrie, Michael Campbell, and Doug Howlett. She manages a staff of six.

Television producer Julie Christie then cast Tetro to appear on the reality series Treasure Island, where she stranded fellow contestants Peggy Bourne and Simon Doull.

She negotiated the contract for Dan Carter as a model for Jockey Underwear, and supplies every model for Farmers advertisements.

=== Television ===
In late 2008, TV3 NZ announced New Zealand's Next Top Model, a spinoff of the successful U.S. series America's Next Top Model. Tetro was cast as the main judge and host on the show alongside Colin Mathura-Jeffree and Chris Sisarich.

She also features as a guest judge on America's Next Top Model, Cycle 14.

== Personal life ==
Tetro was married to former All Black Craig Innes, and has two daughters. The couple separated in 2012. She became a Justice of the Peace in 2016. In 2018 she married Rob Fyfe.

In 2018 Tetro was flown to Antarctica by Antarctica New Zealand as a consultant, which caused comment as her husband was on the board of directors for Antarctica New Zealand.

== See also ==
- List of New Zealand television personalities
