= Danielle Hayes =

New Zealand model

- Born: Danielle Hayes; 18 February 1991 (age 35); Whakatane, New Zealand
- Years active: 2010–2019
- Modelling information
- Height: 5 ft 9.5 in (1.77 m)
- Hair colour: Brown
- Eye colour: Brown

Danielle Hayes (born 18 February 1991) is a New Zealand former fashion model, best known for being the first Māori winner of the series New Zealand's Next Top Model, Cycle 2 in 2010.

== Career ==
Hayes was previously signed to 62 Models in Auckland, New Zealand but is then represented by Unique Model Management. She was also signed with Darley Models in Australia, One Management in New York in 2013, Kismet Management in LA, D Management in Cape Town, IZAIO in Berlin, and CITY MODELS in Paris.

Since featuring on Next Top Model, Hayes had appeared in Cleo Magazine, Metro Magazine (cover), The Dominion Post Autumn/Winter Magazine, Black Magazine, Remix Magazine, Karen Magazine, Faint Magazine, Ellements Magazine, Unfolded Magazine. She has modeled for Zoe and Morgan Jewellery, Glamuzina Jewellery and Te Rongo Kirkwood Jewellery and appeared at the New Zealand Fashion Festival (modelling for Annah Stretton, Ricochet, Vanilla Ink, Tanya Carlson and Matchi Motchi). Hayes was also seen at the Fashion For Relief Runway Show in Christchurch. Hayes was invited to model for Jean Paul Gaultier at the Paris Fashion Show 2014.

Hayes then modelling at New Zealand for a couple of years, before retired from the Fashion industry in 2019.
