= Colin Mathura-Jeffree =

New Zealand model, actor, and TV host

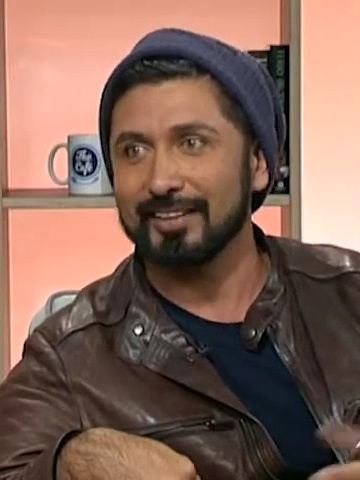
- Mathura-Jeffree in 2016
- Born: 1972 (age 53–54); Auckland, New Zealand
- Modeling information
- Height: 1.81 m (5 ft 11 1/2 in)
- Hair color: Black
- Eye color: Hazel Green
- Website: http://www.colinmathura-jeffree.com/

Colin Mathura-Jeffree (born 1972) is a New Zealand model, actor, television host and spokesperson. He is known as one of the judges for New Zealand's Next Top Model which aired from 2009 until 2011. He is also known as one of the hosts of New Zealand's Hottest Home Baker.

== Career ==
=== Modelling ===
Mathura-Jeffree had previously walked the catwalk for various fashion houses such as Working Style and Versace. He had also modelled for various international fashion magazines. Mathura-Jeffree was previously the face of Tourism Australia "shopping & shows campaign" for New Zealand which aired in 2013.

=== Fashion and beauty ===
Mathura-Jeffree was awarded the title of Special Ambassador representing the Miss World franchise holder, the New Zealand Asia Pacific Trust, at the 2007 Miss World competition in Sanya, China. He has judged pageants including the Ellerslie Racecourse Fashion in the Field contest.

In 2011 to 2017, he was the VIP Ambassador for New Zealand Fashion Week and opened the event in 2016. In the 2017 event he only wore clothes from Hospice Opportunity Shops.

Mathura-Jeffree was named New Zealand's sexiest man in 2012 by Metro.

Mathura-Jeffree was a judge for the Miss South Pacific Beauty Pageant 2013 in the Solomon Islands. In 2017 he was named a REMIX Magazine Icon at their 20-year anniversary Ball featuring their 20 favourite celebrities in print. He was voted by the public in the METRO Magazine Awards issue to be the 'Best Dressed Celebrity 2017'.

=== Television ===
Mathura-Jeffree's acting debut was as the Prince of India in the Xena: Warrior Princess television series (1999), where he played the reincarnation of Gabrielle into a powerful and handsome warrior willing to sacrifice himself to save his Kingdom.

Other roles include a case solving scientist in Lifetime Television's Reckless Behavior: Caught on Tape (also called Stolen Life).

Mathura-Jeffree is known for his work as a judge and runway mentor on the New Zealand model reality series New Zealand's Next Top Model which ran from 2009 until 2011. He has also hosted other TV shows, such as New Zealand's Hottest Home Baker and The Great NZ Dance Masala. In 2010, he was a guest judge on two episodes of America's Next Top Model.

=== Movies ===
Mathura-Jeffree played the lead protagonist in the Bollywood movie and romantic comedy Love Has No Language in 2008.

In 2017 Mathura-Jeffree was included on the jury panel for the Doc Edge Documentary Film Awards which was held in Auckland, New Zealand.

== Charitable work ==
In 2010 Mathura-Jeffree became a goodwill ambassador and spokesperson for the UK-based charity The Railway Children. The charity works worldwide as emergency interventions for children arriving vulnerable and alone at railway stations, particularly Victoria Station in Mumbai where the problem is acute and where Mathura-Jeffree has had personal experience. Inspired by the work of the charity, he has given a promise to raise awareness and funds for The Railway Children and to return to India to see the charity's work for himself.

In 2013 Mathura-Jeffree became Alzheimers New Zealand's first champion for dementia. In this role he works alongside Alzheimers NZ in promoting wider understanding of the condition. Mathura-Jeffree's grandmother Eileen died in 1998 after a long struggle with Alzheimer's disease, the most common form of dementia.

Mathura-Jeffree is a supporter of a number of charities including StarShip Hospice and Cure kids.

== See also ==
- List of New Zealand television personalities
