= America's Next Top Model season 7 =

America's Next Top Model
- Season 7
- Judges: Tyra Banks; Nigel Barker; J. Alexander; Twiggy
- No. of contestants: 13
- Winner: CariDee English
- No. of episodes: 13

Release
- Original network: The CW
- Original release: September 20 – December 6, 2006

Additional information
- Filming dates: April 17 – June 7, 2006

Season chronology
- ← Previous; Season 6 Next → Season 8

The seventh cycle of America's Next Top Model started airing on September 20, 2006 as the first to be aired on The CW network. The season's catch-phrase is "The Competition Won't Be Pretty." The season's promotional theme song is "Hot Stuff (I Want You Back)" by Pussycat Dolls.

To date, this cycle is the most watched season in The CW, averaging 5.13 million viewers per episode. In addition, a new opening was made, different from the last three cycles. J.Manuel also was added to the final judging panel, for a total of five judges deciding on the winner.

The prizes for this cycle were:

- A modeling contract with Elite Model Management.
- A fashion spread and cover in Seventeen.
- A US$100,000 contract with CoverGirl cosmetics.

The following prizes have been removed:

- A modeling contract with Ford Models.
- A fashion spread and cover in Elle.

The international destination during this cycle was Barcelona, Spain, the show’s first visit to the Iberian Peninsula.

The winner was 21-year-old CariDee English from Fargo, North Dakota with Melrose Bickerstaff placing as the runner up.

== Contestants ==
(Ages stated are at time of contest)

Contestant	Age	Height	Hometown	Finish	Place
Christian Evans	19	5 ft 10 in (1.78 m)	Columbia, South Carolina	Episode 2	13
Megan Morris	23 (Note: Megan turned 23 during filming)	5 ft 11 in (1.80 m)	San Francisco, California	Episode 3	12
Monique Calhoun	19	5 ft 10 in (1.78 m)	Chicago, Illinois	Episode 4	11
Megg Morales	18	5 ft 9 in (1.75 m)	Los Angeles, California	Episode 5	10
AJ Stewart	20	5 ft 11 in (1.80 m)	Sacramento, California	Episode 6	9
Brooke Miller	18	5 ft 7 in (1.70 m)	Keller, Texas	Episode 7	8
Anchal Joseph	19	5 ft 11 in (1.80 m)	Homestead, Florida	Episode 9	7
Jaeda Young	18	6 ft 1 in (1.85 m)	Parkersburg, Iowa	Episode 10	6
Michelle Babin (Note: Amanda and Michelle Babin are identical twins; however, they competed individually.)	18	6 ft 0 in (1.83 m)	Anaheim, California	Episode 11	5
Amanda Babin	18	6 ft 0 in (1.83 m)	Anaheim, California	Episode 12	4
Eugena Washington	21	5 ft 11 in (1.80 m)	Palmdale, California	Episode 13	3
Melrose Bickerstaff	23	5 ft 9 in (1.75 m)	West Bloomfield, Michigan	Episode 13	2
CariDee English	21	5 ft 11 in (1.80 m)	Fargo, North Dakota	Episode 13	1

== Episodes ==
No. overall	No. in season	Title	Original release date	US viewers (millions)
73	1	"The Girl Who Marks Her Territory"	September 20, 2006	5.26
The 33 contestants started at Los Angeles International Airport and they met with J. Alexander and Jay Manuel. Their task was to shoot a photo above the runway. Later, the contestants met Tyra and the Aswirl twins (runway challenge–Cycle 6) and they started off with the auditions. A contestant named Cyndel, who referred to herself as an entertainer and told the judges that she worked at a strip club said she considered that stripping "was another part of modeling." Anchal also stood out, principally because of her blue contacts. When asked why she had them in, she said that in India, they found girls with lighter eyes more beautiful. The 33 "contestants" were reduced to 21 contestants who would go onto the next round. The 21 contestants participated in a nude photo shoot, of which the more conservative contestants struggled between their ambition and upbringing. Then the field was narrowed down to 13 contestsnts by the judges, and the episode also introduced Jaslene Gonzalez, who failed to make the final cut down to 13. (Note: Jaslene would later return to the next cycle, where she successfully made the cut and eventually won the competition.) The top thirteen contestants met with Aswirl Twins, as they were sent to a runway competition using the clothes from the designers of Elmer Avenue. The contestants had to choose their clothes off the backs of 13 male models, then "feminize" and wear the outfit down the runway. Melrose was chosen as the winner, allowing her the chance to be "Diva for the Day" on the set of their next photo shoot. At the fashion magazine-inspired house, the contestants were surprised that only 11 beds were available, and maneuvering took place. Monique, who did not get a bed, stole Eugena's and poured water on it, saying it was "pee" in order to ensure nobody tried to take it off her. The next day, Tyra's dramatic diva appearance kicked off a shoot where each contestant has given a model stereotype. The judges liked Amanda, CariDee & A.J.'s photos but questioned Brooke, Jaeda, Christian and Melrose's. The judges felt that Melrose gave a terrible photo from what she "had to work with," pointing out that she looked older than she was in the photo, combined with her bad attitude on set, and she finished in the bottom two. Christian, also in the bottom two, was criticized for being "boring," and showing lack of variations in her shots. The judges felt that Christian had less potential and weaker than Melrose, therefore sending her home.: Featured photographers: Oliver Bronson, Dylan Don; Special guests: Collin Pulsipher, Jonny Day, Ward Robinson, Sean Murphy, Richard Harris, Ron Harris
74	2	"The Girl Who Hates Her Hair"	September 27, 2006	4.68
This episode was about makeovers, the top twelve contestants met with the two Jays at breakfast and they were thought to have a makeover. Instead, the contestants returned to the house and Tyra surprised them with their living room being turned into a makeshift salon, where they received flowery new makeovers. While Brooke, Megg, Eugena, CariDee, Anchal and Megan loved their new looks with gratitude and Amanda and Michelle being okay with their makeovers, Monique, AJ, and Jaeda (who received the most drastic makeover of the day) showed disapproval. Melrose initially hated the fact that her hair was going to be dyed blonde, however, in the end, she embraced it with gratitude. Jay Manuel lost his cool after the makeovers were done, saying that some of the attitudes were disrespectful to the salon management. The challenge this week involved make-up application, speed and presentation. They each raced against the clock to put together their entire look, from make-up to wardrobe, during brief elevator stops on a trip to the top of a skyscraper. Megg and Monique could not make the elevator at various stories, and were eliminated even before the presentation. Eugena was determined the winner by CoverGirl, Queen Latifah and her make-up artist, Roxanna Floyd. Her prize was an exclusive photo shoot for the CoverGirl Web site, which she chose CariDee and Jaeda to share. Back at the house, Monique took off her frustration of her loss in the challenge by using the phone for more than three and a half hours, upsetting other contestants who needed the phone. This was followed by an intense verbal confrontation with Anchal who insisted that Monique was disrespecting others and forcefully hung up her call. The photo shoot involved the contestants to shine through quirky, extravagant wigs and hair pieces. Melrose turned the tables and delivered the best shot this week, while Michelle, Amanda and Anchal also did well. However, Jaeda and Megan both landed in the bottom two for poor photos. Even though Jaeda still disliked her hair, Megan was sent home.: Featured photographer: Tracy Bayne; Special guests: Frederic Fekkai, Queen Latifah, Roxanna Floyd, Mr. Little, Lisa B., Weavin' Steven; CoverGirl of the Week: Anchal Joseph
75	3	"The Girl Who Goes to Texas"	October 4, 2006	5.25
J. Alexander prepared the contestants with a unique crazy, insane runway exercise from atop a ½" wide tight rope. When they got back to the house, Melrose went to use the phone, and Monique barged in and demanded the phone. Melrose then slammed the door on Monique, who retaliated by taking her undergarments off and rubbed them on Melrose's bedsheets. The next day, their runway skills were put to the test in their rockiest challenge yet, with Bre Scullark (cycle 5) appearing as guest. The contestants were asked to strut across cobblestones in high heels while wearing masks which impaired their vision. The winner of the challenge, A.J., picked CariDee and Megg to jet off to work a star-studded Dennis Quaid Charity Weekend Fashion Show with some past seasons’ contestants in Austin, Texas. Later, the contestants had to rock a catwalk suspended over water, but Monique's dehydration landed her in the hospital. She then went home and did not participate in the photo shoot, but made it to judging. While Eugena was walking on the runway, she fell. At judging, Monique was criticized for not pulling through like models in previous cycles have (specifically Danielle from cycle 6). On the other hand, A.J was highly praised for her high fashion look/photo, Melrose for her strong shot which worked and Brooke for her wind in the air walk. In the end, it was Eugena and Monique who landed in the bottom two, both for their inability to translate their beauty into film. Monique was subsequently eliminated for her seeming lack of drive.: Featured photographer: Charlie Altuna; Special guests: Dennis Quaid, Bre Scullark, Emiliano Moreno, Rebecca Epley, Coryn Woitel, April Wilkner, Shannon Stewart, Mercedes Scelba-Shorte, Brittany Brower, Camille McDonald, Richie Gaona; CoverGirl of the Week: Anchal Joseph
76	4	"The Girl Who Joined the Circus"	October 11, 2006	5.50
The top ten contestants learned to strike an extreme pose from a contortionist, and model coach, Stacey McKenzie, and were put to the test in a high fashion challenge. They had a dinner at the restaurant where Twiggy was awaiting. The next day, they learned to show an extreme pose in designer Bao Tranchi's clothing and Erica Courtney jewelry. Eugena was chosen as the winner and won all the jewelry worn during the challenge, totaling $32,000. After the challenge Anchal overheard Melrose talking about her in the hottub and got very upset. The following day, Tyra arrived at the house and had a talk with them. The photo shoot this week was based on a circus freak show into their types of circus freaks. During make-up, Jay called the contestants to meet Seventeen magazine editor Atoosa Rubenstein. Megg and Jaeda struggled in their photos, Megg felt the worst in her photo plus her bearded lady look. At judging, Melrose, A.J. and CariDee were hailed for their performances with Eugena's huge improvement also noted while Jaeda and Megg found themselves in the bottom two, both for their bad photos. In the end, Megg was sent home because of her inability to transfer her personality into a photo. In addition, the judges began to doubt her model potential, as she didn't look like a model in front of the panel, or in any of her photographs.: Featured photographer: Mike Rosenthal; Special guests: Bao Tranchi, Stacey McKenzie, Jonathan Nosan, Erica Courtney, Atoosa Rubenstein; CoverGirl of the Week: AJ Stewart
77	5	"The Girl Who Punk'd Ashton"	October 18, 2006	5.15
A red carpet challenge with former judge Janice Dickinson left some of the contestants speechless. Melrose won the reward challenge, which gave her a night to interview stars on the red carpet as part of Entertainment Tonight staff. Back at the house, Michelle revealed that she might be gay or bisexual, to the surprise of her twin sister Amanda, who became noticeably more introverted after hearing this. While talking to Tyra, Amanda revealed that she was scared for her sister. She came to terms with it and accompanied her sister as Michelle called their mother to tell her. The stars came out at a photo shoot where the contestants were transformed into celebrity couples. During judging, the contestants were asked to be impromptu correspondents and give their best commentary of red carpet footage featuring America's Next Top Model judges, during which Brooke, Eugena and Caridee shone but A.J., Jaeda and Anchal let their self-consciousness show through. Brooke's fantastic photo and great performance at the judging test earned her a first call out. CariDee, Amanda and Melrose also received praise for their overall performance as well. In the end, A.J. and Jaeda were revealed to be in the bottom two, both because the judges weren't sure how much they cared about the competition. The judging concluded in a big shock to the girls when AJ, who had done well consistently throughout the competition, was eliminated. The judges felt that she had just lost her drive to remain in the competition and spared Jaeda for the third time.: Featured photographer: Matthew Jordan Smith; Special guests: Janice Dickinson, Mark Steines, Matt Czuchry, Ryan Hansen, Jared Padalecki; CoverGirl of the Week: AJ Stewart
78	6	"The Girl Who Graduates"	October 25, 2006	5.45
Angered of the things that some of the contestants were doing around the house, Brooke saw a box with a present from her parents: Diploma from her high school graduation and decorations. Then, at a surprise photo shoot, Tyra picked up her camera and surprised the contestants in their backyard with a black-and-white photo shoot where they were asked to look scary with weird contact lenses yet retain their sex appeal at which Caridee and Eugena shone while Amanda and Melrose struggled although both pulled of good shots. The Girls had a lesson with Dita von Teese in burlesque at which Jaeda and Anchal struggled, Caridee and Melrose tried to hard and looked "too Stripper" while Amanda and Eugena did well. The contestants were put to the test by walking down the dinner table of Elite Models director Cathy Gould at her dinner party. Melrose won her third challenge and brought Amanda, Michelle, and Brooke for a Seveneteen magazine editorial spread photo shoot as her reward. To test their new sense about the fine line between 'sexy' and 'sleazy,' Jay Manuel met the contestants for a second photo shoot depicting romance novels with model Fabio. Each girl had their own romance novel title. At the panel Amanda, Melrose, CariDee, and Anchal were named the best as they all excelled. Despite bad takes from Jaeda and Michelle at the photoshoot with Fabio, Eugena and Brooke were revealed as the bottom two. While the judges were irked at Eugena's mannerisms, they doubted Brooke's potential as a model, and wondered whether she was just getting by on her vibrant personality. In a shocking end, Eugena was saved for the second time because of her strong contacts photo and Brooke was ironically eliminated on the night of her high school graduation.: Featured photographers: Jeffrey Jones, Tyra Banks, Randee St. Nicholas; Special guests: Fabio, Dita von Teese, Sutan Amrull, Kylie Bax, Atoosa Rubenstein, Beau Quillian, Cathy Gould, Elyssa Traub; CoverGirl of the Week: CariDee English
79	7	"The Girls Who Made it This Far"	November 1, 2006	4.41
This episode recapped the process that the top seven contestants had, including some never-before-seen footage. One such scene was during the very first hour the contestants entered the house, when they met their wardrobe stylist Charlie Altuna and makeup artist Sutan, who had with them a "Fashion Trash" bin, and confiscated whatever of the contestants’ clothing they deemed "unfashionable." However, after this abrupt event, the contestants were brought to Skyla where they had five minutes to shop for "fashionable top model" clothing. Footage included a catfight between CariDee, Amanda, Michelle, Jaeda (to Brooke & AJ), Megan, Megg and Monique, who went on a rampage and threw away almost every other foodstuff in the house into the garbage when Monique found out that her Doritos were eaten. Amanda then ran provocatively around the house opening every other closet that contained any remains of food, all the while shouting, "there's food there!" Finally, the contestants met with yoga instructor Shirley Archer for a relaxing time of meditation, and Jaeda impersonated Tyra at eliminations while all the contestants were in a dressing room. Right before announcing who was "going home," CariDee unexpectedly passed gas, which stopped all the girls and caused them to laugh.: Special guests: Charlie Altuna, Sutan Amrull, Shirley Archer, Frederic Fekkai
80	8	"The Girl Who Wrecks the Car"	November 8, 2006	5.37
The next day, the top seven contestants headed to the beach where they met pro athlete and model Gabrielle Reece where she taught the contestants the art of action modeling while they bumped, set and spiked to beach volleyball. The contestants got even more physical with NASCAR driver Stanton Barrett for a competition where they had to take their own shots using a remote controlled camera. Although accidentally denting Stanton's car, Michelle won the challenge and picked Amanda, CariDee, and Melrose to share her reward. Unknown to them, there was a reward challenge within the challenge, where the four contestants had to act fast and don as many pieces of clothing within 30 seconds. Melrose won the prize of $10,000 worth of clothing and jewelry. Back at the house, the tension between Anchal and Melrose reached a boiling point when Melrose accused Anchal of being childish and disrespectful to others, causing a visibly affected Anchal to retreat to her room. For the week's photo shoot, the girls received their first CoverGirl assignment, shooting for TruBlend whipped foundation, modeling as space-sirens. They flew at a skydiving training facility, where many contestants had difficulty expressing grace inside a wind tunnel. During judging, the contestants had to act out a scene derived from a verb and adverb randomly drawn from a box. CariDee received the first call-out for the second time in the competition. Melrose, Amanda and Michelle had also excelled throughout this week's photoshoot, while the judges appreciated the effort that Jaeda and Eugena demonstrated during the judging challenge despite delivering bad photoshoots. Michelle and Anchal landed in the bottom two, both for the first time ever and due to their apparent lack of drive. Although the judges were turned off by Michelle's lack of drive, they decided that she was the stronger model and Tyra warned Michelle to show more passion and drive before she gets eliminated. Anchal was eliminated for letting her lack of self-confidence consistently hold her back and not trying "to fake it until she makes it" if she was so determined to be in the competition.: Featured photographer: Patrik Giardino; Special guests: Gabrielle Reece, Stanton Barrett, James St. James, Kate Nobelius; CoverGirl of the Week: CariDee English
81	9	"The Girl Who Breaks Down"	November 15, 2006	4.71
The top six contestants met with acting coach Tasha Smith at the Los Angeles Repertory Company for acting lessons, and all took turns performing exercises to learn how to break down their physical boundaries. Each contestant then shot their own silent film, acting out the direction given to them. After an emotional day, CariDee was chosen as the winner, earning her a guest spot on One Tree Hill. The girls then viewed CariDee’s winning silent film, and Tyra surprised them with a trip to Barcelona, Spain. Once the girls landed in Barcelona, they were happily surprised when their driver made several stops along the way to pick up male models who would be part of their next challenge. Together, they went to dinner at a traditional Spanish restaurant, where they learned they would shoot a commercial the next day in the Catalan language. Tensions rose between Jaeda and her male model Nacho after he told her he did not like black women. The following day the contestants shot a Secret deodorant commercial, where they had to kiss their male model at the end. Most of the contestants struggled with their lines and the pressure to perform in another language. Eugena and Melrose excelled. Melrose was praised by the judges as giving the best performance – much to the dislike of Eugena and Amanda, Eugena was hailed for her huge improvement and Michelle was criticized for her terrible kiss. However, CariDee, who had previously been favored by the judges, gave one of the worst commercials. CariDee landed in the bottom two with Jaeda. The judges deemed Jaeda as the weakest girl, overall as well as with her commercial, and despite giving her several chances, Jaeda gave them no reasons to continue keeping her in the competition, eliminating her after a total of four bottom two appearances.: Featured commercial director: Denis Rovira; Special guests: Tasha Smith, Lee Norris; CoverGirl of the Week: CariDee English
82	10	"The Girl Who Sticks Her Foot in Mouth"	November 22, 2006	4.07
Shaken from her near elimination, CariDee struggled to rebound from an off week. In order to relieve some anxiety, the top five contestants invited their Spanish models from their last commercial shoot over for dinner. The next day, Tyra visited the contestants and had a sit down talk about the harsh reality's of the modeling industry, before the contestants met up with Pancho Saula, the director of Elite Barcelona, who has set up 10 go-sees for them to attend all around the city. Eugena and CariDee teamed up, as did the twins, while Melrose decided to hit the streets alone, a strategy that seemed to pay off as she managed to attend the most number of auditions. When the twins got lost, they arrived late, they ended up disqualifying themselves. Melrose won her fourth reward challenge, and she chose CariDee to share in her reward – a catered dinner at their apartment. For this week’s photo shoot, the contestants arrived at the La Monumental bullfighting arena and met their photographer, Nigel Barker. CariDee made a crude joke to Nigel, which was edited for him to appear offended, however according to CariDee in an Entertainment Weekly online interview, he actually recognized her humor and joked along with her. For the shoot, the contestsnts had to pose as bullfighters in front of a live bull, though their bullfighting capes were edited in so that the contestants were not genuinely harmed by the bull. At the photo shoot Eugena and Michelle shone while Amanda and Caridee struggled. At panel, the contestants were asked to tell the judges who they felt had the most and least amount of potential. Michelle’s insecurities finally overwhelmed her as she broke down in front of the judges, conflicted by her doubts of whether she really wanted to be a model. Eugena impressed the judges by confessing that she started so weakly in the contest, stating that a "journey" took place. CariDee then gave an apology letter to Nigel after her offensive conversation with him. During deliberation, Michelle’s identity crisis made them question whether Michelle was sacrificing her place for Amanda. Consequentially, the twins landed in the bottom two, where Tyra noted that Amanda (who in the past had never even had an appearance in the bottom three) has the passion, but her natural talent was questionable and Michelle, who was probably the most naturally talented model in the competition, pretty much eliminated herself by her lack of passion. It was Amanda's drive to win that won the judges over as her sister was eliminated.: Featured photographer: Nigel Barker; Special guests: Pancho Saula, Julie Cher, Susana Castano, Jorge Paulo de Oliveira Terra, Victoriano Simon, Julie Sohn; CoverGirl of the Week: CariDee English
83	11	"The Girl Who Grates"	November 29, 2006	5.73
The top four contestants traveled to a dance studio where they met flamenco dancer Nacho Blancho, who taught them the steps of the traditional Spanish dance. While Eugena breezed through the practice, Amanda's awkwardness became apparent. Later that night, the contestants shared a dinner with runway coach and judge Miss J. Alexander, before returning to their apartment to rehearse their dance steps. CariDee and Eugena repeatedly expressed their disdain for Melrose and wished for the two of them to be the Final Two. The next morning, the contestants arrived at a majestic Spanish villa for their flamenco dance test, decked out in full flamenco attire. Melrose, who didn't practice earlier and said she would shine, was the only girl who made a mistake. Nacho was impressed by Amanda’s improvement but crowned Eugena the winner, who picked Amanda to share in her prize, which turned out to be three presents bearing clothes worn at the Custo Barcelona Fall 2006 collection. Melrose then got upset because she didn't do as well as she expected to. For the photoshoot, the contestants met with Jay Manuel who brought out Tyra to assist. The contestants were paired up – Eugena and Melrose, Amanda and CariDee – to pose as nymphs floating underwater. While Melrose shone in the freezing water, Eugena delivered many blank shots and was unable to stay afloat although managed to deliver some pretty shots. CariDee had to be pulled out from the icy water prematurely when she got hypothermia and started shivering uncontrollably. She was later told to speak up and know how to "listening to her body." Amanda had to finish the rest of the 50 frames left in the shoot by herself. At panel, Melrose was the only girl to survive from any negative critique from the judges. They warned Eugena about her bland expressions, although her final photo was praised and still had reservations about Amanda’s stiffness and awkward posing while criticizing CariDee's weak physical demands of being a model. Though she was praised for not allowing her coldness to show on her face in the photoshoot. CariDee and Amanda landed in the bottom two both for the second time; Amanda's look was edgy and high-fashion, but the judges worried if she was overly awkward and meek, while CariDee's look was classic, but may not be able to take the physical demands of being a model. Tyra ultimately handed the last photo to Caridee, who told her to conquer her weaknesses. Amanda, the other Babin twin, was sent packing.: Featured photographer: David Ruiz; Special guests: Nacho Blancho, Naama Hernandez Ruiz; CoverGirl of the Week: CariDee English
84	12	"The Girl Who Becomes America's Next Top Model"	December 6, 2006	6.19
The top three contestants met Jay Manuel to shoot their commercial for CoverGirl Outlast Double Lip Shine, where they met last cycle's winner Dani Evans. First up was CariDee, whose natural enthusiasm shone through after Tyra regurgitated her from the previous panel. While Eugena once again started off with bland takes, she finally turned on the charm for a great delivery, while Melrose struggled with her being over-prepared. During their CoverGirl print ad shoot, CariDee once again shone with her blissful look and strong picture and commercial, as well as her strong portfolio, while Eugena delivered some passionate shots. Melrose, affected by her earlier performance, stumbled in her shoot. The judges believe that Melrose has failed to live up to her past performances, and Eugena's passion was still questioned. Ultimately, Melrose joined CariDee as the final two as Eugena was eliminated. Melrose was the first and the last girl to be in the bottom two this season and got spared.: Featured photographer: Jim De Yonker; In preparation for the final runway challenge, Tyra set up a sit-down talk with life coach Dr. Michelle. Next, the final two met Jay Manuel at their final runway, where they had to play ghostly brides in wedding gowns designed by Victorio & Lucchino. The final show would be set in Antoni Gaudí's world-famous Park Güell. As night fell on Barcelona, Danielle began the show while Melrose and CariDee kicked off their catwalk face-off. The second walk required the girls to stop and stare down each other halfway down the runway. A minor disaster occurred when CariDee accidentally stepped on Melrose's train and ripped it in the middle of the runway. After a brief moment of shock, Melrose recovered quickly and continued her walk confidently. However, the drama began to stir at the changing room as Melrose blamed CariDee for the torn gown. The final segment began with Jay Alexander dressed in a black wedding gown running out on the catwalk, screaming theatrically, and the girls followed suit, with CariDee overdoing it. The show ended off with CariDee and Melrose's final walk at the runway, together with their last face-off pose before "disappearing" from the runway. Back in the judging room (with Jay Manuel present as judge), the judges were torn because Caridee had a strong CoverGirl photo, but performed poorly in the fashion show; while Melrose did worse in the Covergirl shoot, but excelled in the fashion show. The judges appreciated Melrose's fashion knowledge and persistence to win the competition, but she came off as too clinical. Meanwhile, CariDee was lambasted for her sometimes too loud personality, although she had the much sought after "X-Factor." The finalists returned and Tyra announced CariDee as the seventh winner of America's Next Top Model.: Featured photographer: George Holz; Special guests: Dani Evans, Victorio & Lucchino, Atoosa Rubenstein, Beau Quillian, Michelle Callahan

== Summaries ==
=== Call-out order ===
Order	Episodes												
Order	1	2	3	4	5	6	7	9	10	11	12	13	
1	Melrose	Michelle	Melrose	A.J.	CariDee	Brooke	Amanda	CariDee	Melrose	Eugena	Melrose	CariDee	CariDee
2	Jaeda	CariDee	Anchal	Jaeda	Eugena	Melrose	CariDee	Melrose	Eugena	Melrose	Eugena	Melrose	Melrose
3	Michelle	A.J.	Amanda	Brooke	A.J.	Amanda	Anchal	Jaeda	Amanda	CariDee	CariDee	Eugena	
4	Eugena	Megan	Michelle	Anchal	Melrose	CariDee	Melrose	Amanda	Michelle	Amanda	Amanda		
5	Brooke	Anchal	A.J.	Michelle	Michelle	Michelle	Jaeda	Eugena	CariDee	Michelle			
6	Anchal	Megg	CariDee	Melrose	Anchal	Eugena	Michelle	Michelle	Jaeda				
7	A.J.	Monique	Brooke	Megg	Amanda	Anchal	Eugena	Anchal					
8	Christian	Amanda	Eugena	Amanda	Brooke	Jaeda	Brooke						
9	Megg	Jaeda	Megg	CariDee	Jaeda	A.J.							
10	Megan	Eugena	Monique	Eugena	Megg								
11	CariDee	Brooke	Jaeda	Monique									
12	Amanda	Melrose	Megan										
13	Monique	Christian											

The contestant was eliminated
The contestant won the competition

=== Bottom two ===
Episode	Contestants	Eliminated
1	Christian & Melrose	Christian
2	Jaeda & Megan	Megan
3	Eugena & Monique	Monique
4	Jaeda & Megg	Megg
5	A.J & Jaeda	A.J
6	Brooke & Eugena	Brooke
8	Anchal & Michelle	Anchal
9	CariDee & Jaeda	Jaeda
10	Amanda & Michelle	Michelle
11	Amanda & CariDee	Amanda
12	Eugena & Melrose	Eugena
12	CariDee & Melrose	Melrose

The contestant was eliminated after their first time in the bottom two
The contestant was eliminated after their second time in the bottom two
The contestant was eliminated after their third time in the bottom two
The contestant was eliminated after their fourth time in the bottom two
The contestant was eliminated in the final judging and placed as the runner-up

=== Average call-out order ===
Casting call-out order and final two are not included.

Rank by average	Place	Model	Call-out total	Number of call-outs	Call-out average
1–2	1	CariDee	37	11	3.36
1–2	2	Melrose	37	11	3.36
3	9	A.J.	21	5	4.20
4	4	Amanda	45	10	4.50
5	5	Michelle	41	9	4.56
6	7	Anchal	34	7	4.86
7	3	Eugena	56	11	5.09
8	8	Brooke	38	6	6.33
9	6	Jaeda	53	8	6.63
10–11	10	Megg	32	4	8.00
10–11	12	Megan	16	2	8.00
12	11	Monique	28	3	9.33
13	13	Christian	13	1	13.00

=== Photo shoot guide ===
- Episode 1 photo shoot was split in two halves:
  - First half: Rooftop nude shot (casting)
  - Second half(Episode 2): Model stereotypes
- Episode 3 photo shoot: Hair Wars
- Episode 4 photo shoot: Runway on water
- Episode 5 photo shoot: Circus characters
- Episode 6 photo shoot: Portraying famous celebrity couples
- Episode 7 photo shoots: Romance novels with Fabio; Black & white scary/sexy beauty shots
- Episode 9 photo shoot: CoverGirl TruBlend whipped foundation in outer space
- Episode 10 commercial: Secret Deodorant commercial in Catalan
- Episode 11 photo shoot: Spanish bullfighters
- Episode 12 photo shoot: Floating water nymphs in pairs
- Episode 13 photo shoots & Commercial: CoverGirl Outlast Double Lip Shine commercial & print ad; Seventeen Magazine covers

=== Other cast members ===
- Jay Manuel – Photo Director
- Sutan – Make-up Artist
- Christian Marc – Hair Stylist
- Anda & Masha – Wardrobe

=== Makeovers ===
- Megan - Cut shorter and dyed ice blonde
- Monique - Long layered wavy dark brown weave
- Megg - Extra-long curly brown extensions
- A.J. - Linda Evangelista inspired cut and dyed light brown
- Brooke - Dyed chocolate brown
- Anchal - Layered with adjusted hairline
- Jaeda - Halle Berry inspired pixie cut and dyed dark brown
- Michelle - Permed wavy and dyed light red
- Amanda - Straightened and dyed fire-engine red
- Eugena - Long wavy black weave
- Melrose - Dyed platinum blonde and eyebrows lightened ala Nadja Auermann
- CariDee - Long wavy blonde extensions

== Post-Top Model careers ==
- Christian Evans signed with Elite Model Management in Atlanta, runway division.
- Megan Morris has been signed with NEXT Model Management.
- Monique Calhoun has modeled in Tokyo and was signed with L.A. Models and Code Model Management. She is now signed with Heffner Management under the name 'Monique Stateena'.
- Megg Morales was signed with Red Model Management and did some print work and has gotten a showcard for Fashion Week SS09. She is now a Model/Artist living in Berlin, Germany. Megg is still involved in the fashion scene internationally (she is self managed from Berlin/Europe). She is also a performance artist, and is a singer in a two-piece band called "S0S0SAI". Megg's Artist name is RecklessRedemption.
- A.J. Stewart has modeled in Hong Kong, Tokyo and South Korea.
- Brooke Miller has graduated from University of Texas at Austin, and has taken test shots.
- Anchal Joseph has modeled in Miami and Morocco, booked magazine editorials in ZOOM, French VOGUE with Bruce Weber, ELLE Singapore, Night, and Artemis. In addition to that she has booked campaigns for SOFI Swimwear and Eva Danielle NYC as well as shows for FUNKSHION Miami Fashion Week. She is represented by Manny Roman and is signed with Mars Model Management, and Roman Management. In 2018, she was chosen as a briefcase model for a revival of Deal or No Deal on CNBC; her briefcase is number 22.
- Jaeda Young has finished her education and got married. She now goes by the name Jaeda Young-Englund.
- Amanda and Michelle Babin, who had been represented by L.A Models prior to the show, have continued modeling. They appeared in cycle 8, posing for photographs with contestant Brittany Hatch. They were featured in an editorial in the December 2006 issue of Seventeen. They have also recently modeled in Milan. They later appeared in episode one of cycle 10. They also appeared in the thriller flick, From Within and in a song "Don't Listen To Him," sung by Leila Avila.
- Eugena Washington has walked the runway in shows for L.A. Fashion Week, including Anthony Franco and Kevan Hall. She has also modeled for Southpole. She had her own billboard in Times Square, appeared in ads for Walmart, and can be seen in TJ Maxx's "Maxxinista" commercial. She made an appearance in the music video "Nothin' on You" by B.o.B feat. Bruno Mars. She is signed with Elite Model Management and appeared in cycle 11 Top Model's in Action. She also made an appearance in the tenth season of Hell's Kitchen as a model walking on a runway. In 2015, Eugena became a Playboy Playmate and later became the 2016 Playboy Playmate of the Year.
- Melrose Bickerstaff is currently signed with Lenni's Model Management in London, has done ads for Scoop NYC, Jack Rabbit Belts, and the Beau Soleil Fall 2007 Collection, and walked the runway at London Fashion Week Fall/Winter 2008 for designer Aminika Wilmot. She was previously signed to Bleu Model Management and L.A. Models, as well as Storm Model Management in late 2007.
- CariDee English has collected all of her prizes. She is also working with the Psoriasis Foundation and has been featured in several magazines, fashion shows and campaigns. She continued to be signed with Elite Model Management but is now represented by The Suchin Company. In March 2009, she began hosting Pretty Wicked, a reality show for the Oxygen network that seeks to find inner beauty in ten bad girls. CariDee is pursuing a music career alongside her modeling career. She is currently signed with First Option Model Agency in Dublin. She starred in a commercial for Stelara.
