= Dani Evans =

American fashion model (born 1985)

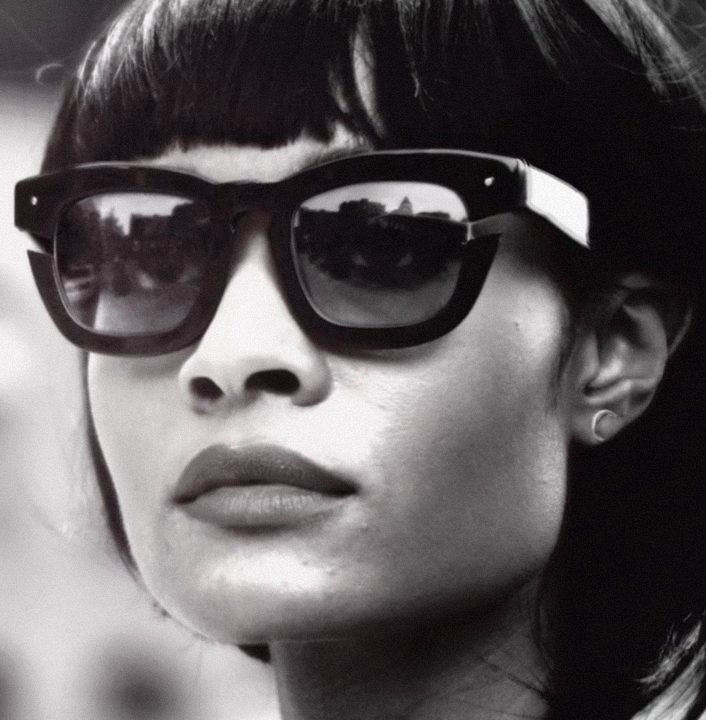
- Evans in 2015
- Born: Danielle Evans; June 4, 1985 (age 41); Little Rock, Arkansas, U.S.
- Occupation: Fashion Model
- Modeling information
- Height: 5 ft 11 in (1.80 m)
- Hair color: Black
- Eye color: Dark Brown
- Agency: Elite Model Management; Ford Models, Click Models, Chick Models, Women-Direct Model Management

Danielle "Dani" Evans (born June 4, 1985, in Little Rock, Arkansas) is an American model, crowned the winner of Cycle 6 of America's Next Top Model in the spring of 2006. She currently resides in New York City, where she founded Monrowe, a unisex line of ready-to-wear hats.

== America's Next Top Model ==
=== Winning America's Next Top Model Cycle 6 ===
Evans was the ninth contestants selected (just before Kathy Hoxit, Furonda Brasfield, Gina Choe and Wendy Wiltz filled the final four places) for the top thirteen to compete on the UPN reality television show America's Next Top Model Cycle 6. She never placed below sixth and was thought by the judges to be one of the front-runners in the competition, noted for her striking face. Over her stay, Evans was voted Covergirl of the Week twice, received one first call-out and would have won the Go-See challenge had the final four been on time. It was not until the second half of the contest that she came under criticism for her heavy southern accent, which the judges felt was problematic, as the competition winner would shoot commercials for Covergirl; however, they acknowledged that she could work with a speech coach to eradicate her accent. Evans had two consecutive bottom two appearances in Bangkok where she survived both over Sara Albert and Jade Cole. In the finale, the judges were torn, with some of the judges preferring fellow finalist Joanie Dodds's versatile portfolio, while others (notably judge Nigel Barker) preferring Evans's "signature look." However, they felt Evans had the stronger in-person presence and commanded the final catwalk as well as having a stunning portfolio. Evans's charisma and charm edged out Dodds, thus crowning her the sixth winner of America's Next Top Model.

=== America's Next Top Model Cycle 7 ===
Evans appeared in the final episode of Cycle 7 to assist the top three contestants (Eugena Washington, CariDee English and Melrose Bickerstaff) with their CoverGirl Outlast Double Lip Shine commercial and photoshoot.

After Washington was eliminated, English and Bickerstaff participated in the final runway playing ghostly brides in wedding gowns designed by Victorio & Lucchino with Evans opening the show.

=== America's Next Top Model Cycle 9 ===
Evans appeared in a Cycle 9 episode posing in an Akademiks photoshoot for Seventeen magazine with challenge winner Lisa Jackson along with fellow contestants chosen to participate, Janet Mills and Ebony Morgan.

== Career ==
After the show, Evans signed with Ford Models as part of her prize. She is now signed with Elite Model Management.

=== Monrowe ===
In 2017, Evans launched Monrowe, a unisex hat company named after and inspired by her jazz-musician grandfather, Monrowe Franklin.

=== Print work ===
Evans has been featured in editorials for Elle, Elle Girl, Essence, InStyle , In Touch Weekly, New York Post, Boston Globe, PowerPlay, MetroStyle, Cover, Venus, Boston Proper, and Jewel.

Evans has appeared in advertising campaigns for Tory Burch, Victoria’s Secret, CoverGirl, Saks Fifth Avenue, Nordstrom, Macy's, Sephora, New York & Company, Samsung, Sears, Garnier Fructis, Akademiks and CoverGirl eyewear.

She has been featured in catalogues/lookbooks for Max Mara, Hugo Boss, Calvin Klein, Eileen Fisher, Nordstrom, and Macy's.

In 2020, she appeared on the cover of Harper's Bazaar Vietnam.

=== Runway ===
Evans has walked the runway for Issue, Victorio & Lucchino, Baby Phat Fall '07, Zang Toi Fall '07, BET'S Rip the Runway, Style Salon, Jenni Kayne's spring collection fashion show, and Carlos Campos Fashion Design during New York Fashion Week. She has received a showcard from her agency, Click Model Management, for NY Fashion Week. She is one of few ANTM alumnae to be given a showcard for fashion week, an honor she received multiple times. Evans also walked in Korto Momolu's finale show on Project Runway season 5. She walked for Y-3 and William Rast F/W 2010 New York Fashion Week. Evans walked for TRIAS, Farah Angsana, Mara Hoffman Fall 2011 New York Fashion Week, and Michael Knight and Zang Toi in NY Fashion Week Spring 2012 show (Sept. 2011).

=== Commercial ===
In 2006 Evans starred in The CW CoverGirl commercial campaign "My Life as a Cover Girl", as well as a CoverGirl commercial with fellow CoverGirls Queen Latifah and Tiiu Kuik. She was one of only a few Top Model winners to have her CoverGirl contract renewed and can be seen in multiple ads for the brand. She has been featured as one of CoverGirl's Top Models in Action. In 2009, Evans appeared on the cover of Kouture Magazine. Her shoot appeared on YouTube. Evans also appeared in a 2013 commercial for Target's Everyday Collection and as a model for women's clothing retailers New York and Company's website.

=== Other ===
Evans made a guest appearance at Chris Brown's MTV special My Super Sweet 16. She is the spokesmodel for Akademiks and appeared on The Wendy Williams Show on September 16, 2009, as a model for Pastry, a line owned by Vanessa Simmons and Angela Simmons. She was featured in the Victoria's Secret PINK online style guide in December 2009.

== Sources ==
| Preceded by Nicole Linkletter | America's Next Top Model winner Cycle 6 (2006) | Succeeded by CariDee English |
