= CariDee English =

American model (born 1984)

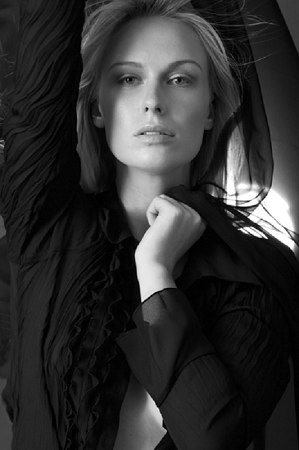
- English in 2007 for her Elite Model Management portfolio.
- Born: September 23, 1984 (age 41); Fargo, North Dakota, U.S.
- Occupation: Model
- Years active: 2001–present
- Modeling information
- Height: 5 ft 11 in (1.80 m)
- Hair color: Blonde
- Eye color: Green
- Agency: Elite Model Management, L.A. Models

CariDee English (born September 23, 1984) is an American fashion model and TV personality who won Cycle 7 of America's Next Top Model in December 2006. Her prize was a $100,000 contract with CoverGirl Cosmetics, a modeling contract with Elite Models, and a six-page fashion editorial and cover for Seventeen magazine. She is the second ANTM winner from North Dakota, the first being Nicole Linkletter of Cycle 5. English was also the host of Oxygen's biggest-premiering show to date, Pretty Wicked.

== Winning America's Next Top Model ==
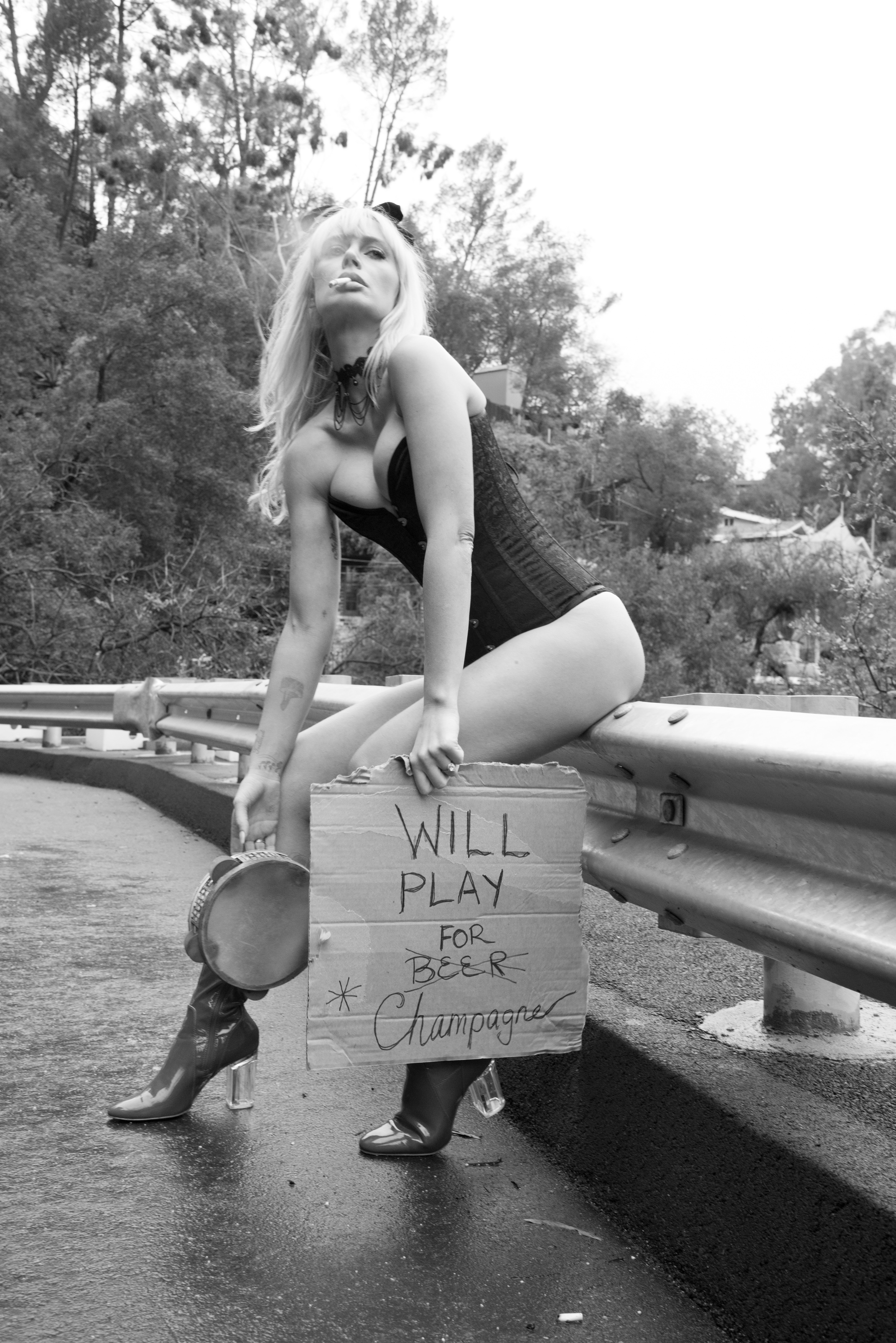
English photographed in Laurel Canyon, Los Angeles in 2019.

English was the eleventh contestant selected (just before Amanda Babin and Monique Calhoun filled the final two places) for the seventh cycle of America's Next Top Model. From the start, she was noted for her similarity to Rebecca Romijn and Karolína Kurková, and in the early stages of the cycle her personality was considered fun and outgoing. Throughout the competition, English was selected to participate in challenge prizes won by Eugena Washington (alongside Jaeda Young), A.J. Stewart (alongside Megg Morales), Michelle Babin (alongside Melrose Bickerstaff and Amanda Babin) and Melrose Bickerstaff. She also had close friendships with Megan Morris and Anchal Joseph.

English received five consecutive Covergirl of the week awards, three first call-outs for her outstanding performances in photoshoots and won the acting challenge. As the acting challenge winner, English had an opportunity to guest-star in an episode of the CW series One Tree Hill (which aired immediately following Top Model at the time), appearing in multiple scenes. In the same episode, English was criticized for not being able to deliver a commercial properly, even thought it was in Spanish, however due to showing more potential, she survived her first-ever bottom two appearance over Jaeda Young who was eliminated in her fourth bottom two appearance.

Later, in episode eleven, English was criticized for making an impulsive, crude joke to fashion photographer and ANTM judge Nigel Barker during the bullfighting photo shoot in Barcelona, asking him "Did you just remove that (referring to a large stick Barker was holding) from your ass from the last panel?" which Melrose Bickerstaff could not believe English said. English stated that Barker "actually joked back", and was never really mad, yet during panel she apologized to Barker and received the third call-out that week placing both the twins in the bottom two where Michelle Babin was eliminated. The next week, English was placed in the bottom two again for her doubtful strength to work in tough circumstances (i.e. photoshoot in cold water). Once more, she survived her second bottom two appearance over the remaining twin, Amanda, who was eliminated in her second consecutive bottom two appearance.

English was shown speaking to her boyfriend on the phone in one episode, and then passionately kissing one of the male models the girls worked with in the next, when the girls were overseas in Barcelona. When interviewed about it, English said that up to that point, she and her boyfriend were seeing other people, and that they had since gotten back together. As the competition progressed, the judges began to express concern that, due to her behavior, English might be too unpredictable to be awarded the Top Model prize. Ultimately though, she was crowned the winner over runner-up Melrose Bickerstaff. The judges said they felt she had the much sought-after "X-Factor"—an intangible quality that made her a standout.

In early 2008, English was voted as one of the most memorable contestants on Top Model by AOL Entertainment Canada, which said she was the first contestant everybody knew would win from the first episode.

== Other modeling ==
She appeared on the weekly "My Life as a CoverGirl" segments on The CW. In 2007 she was featured in an ad for CoverGirl Eyewear alongside cycle 6 winner Danielle Evans. She returned to ANTM for the finale of the eighth cycle to give advice to the final three contestants and to open the finale's runway show.

English was featured on the front page of Seventeen, Social Life, Healthy Living, Psoriasis Advance, and Cover magazines with Top Model alumnae Naima Mora and Danielle Evans. She has modeled for Wedding Style, JCPenney Bisou Bisou, Stephenson Denim, Johnny P. Shoes, American Salon, Matrix Professional Colors in Cosmopolitan and the "Heart On My Sleeves" clothing campaign by Aubrey O'Day of Danity Kane and Christian Siriano Fall 09. She was in the Winter 2007 issue of Knit.1 Magazine, the February 2007 issue of Seventeen, the March 2007 issue of In Touch, the Spring 2007 issue of Social Life, the April 2007 issue of Cover, on the cover of "Inked Magazine" for Fall 2007, Loops&Pluto, Short Hair Magazine the cover of Runway Magazine, ads for Melissa Latkins t-shirts, Tasola Beauty & Beyond, and has been featured on ivillage.com. She also shot a cover of Allure. She has also been featured on Mystyle.com and Blastmagazine.com.

Her runway credits include JCPenney, Carlos Campos, Renee Larc, Jordi Scott, Snoopy in Fashion, GM Style Auto Show, Honduras Fashion Week, L'Oréal Fashion Week in Toronto, In Style's 2009's New Year's Eve lingerie show at the Estate, where she was the guest of honor New York Fashion Week, Richie Rich F/W 09 "Blondes have more fun" Show in Mercedes Benz Fall Fashions 09. She also opened Los Angeles Fashion Week wearing Yotam Soloman, walked in A*Muse Fall/Winter 2010, and Christian Siriano 2010 line in Mercedes Benz Fashion Week 10.

=== Television work ===
English had a cameo appearance on One Tree Hill as a prize for winning the acting challenge on ANTM. She also appeared in a small role on Gossip Girl. She co-hosted MTV's Scarred and the Pretty Wicked reality show on Oxygen.

She appeared several times on the Tyra Banks Show and has been featured in the advertising campaign for ANTM on Oxygen. She appears in the 2012 commercial for Stelara (Ustekinumab), a plaque psoriasis treatment.

=== Social ===
English has taken part in the Seventh Annual World Poker Invitational at the Commerce Casino in 2009. She has also hosted several parties and hosted the Capital Fashion Awards in Sacramento together with Jonathan Waud, Naima Mora and Merlin Castell.

=== Music ===
English is featured on Brad Walsh's album "Human Nature" in the song called Boy/Girl. In 2009, she said she was working on music with Better than Ezra. English is a drummer, and performed with Celebrity DJ Lindsay Luv in a girl drum and DJ duo they called LUVnENGLISH. English also played drums with the New York-based DJ Zeke Thomas, even making a short video of them working together. English sings, plays guitar, drums and said "I would have been a rockstar first but being a model paid the bills faster."

== Philanthropy and animal rights ==
English is a former spokesperson for the National Psoriasis Foundation. In March 2020, the National Psoriasis Foundation announced that English was no longer their spokesperson after she shared a post urging her followers to stop taking their psoriasis medication during the COVID-19 pandemic. In 2007, she was spreading awareness about psoriasis and encouraging others to seek treatment. English says she felt "cursed" with psoriasis when she was young because of the taunts of classmates. Today, her "curse" is her cause. "Psoriasis awareness is very important to me. I want others with the disease to know they are not alone. I want to inspire them to live their dreams," she said. As such she opened the walk for Awareness on January 13, 2008, in San Diego and was featured on the cover for Allure. She has also held a congressional briefing on Psoriasis on June 11, 2007. She has taken part in the walk for awareness multiple times since. She was also featured in the Canadian Psoriasis Education website.

English has also taken part in a video against seal hunting. She also attended the Power of Paws opening, an association which promotes animals as part of health programs and promoted Project Cuddle. She has also taken part in the NOH8 Campaign.

== Personal life ==
English has struggled with drug addiction and body dysmorphic disorder.

== Television ==
Year	Title	Role	Notes
2006	America's Next Top Model	Herself	Winner
2006	One Tree Hill	Tia (Brooke's Model in Red dress)	Season 4 Episode 7 "All These Things That I've Done"
2007	The Tyra Banks Show	Herself	Guest
2007	Gossip Girl	Bart's date / Carissa	1 episode
2007	Scarred	Herself	Co-host
2009	Pretty Wicked	Herself	Host
2019	Betrayed	Priscilla Strole	

Preceded by Danielle Evans	America's Next Top Model winner Cycle 7 (2006)	Succeeded by Jaslene Gonzalez
