= Akademik =

Akademik may refer to:

- Akademiks, a US clothing brand
- Akademik Stadium, a Bulgarian football stadium
- PFC Akademik Sofia, a Bulgarian football club
- Akademik Svishtov, a Bulgarian football club
- Akademik, a transliterated Soviet title for academicians
- Akademik Lomonosov, nuclear barge
- Akademik Shokalskiy, research ship
- Akademik Ioffe, research ship
- Akademik Fedorov, flagship research ship

== See also ==
- Academy
