= America's Next Top Model season 6 =

America's Next Top Model
- Season 6
- Judges: Tyra Banks; Nigel Barker; J. Alexander; Twiggy
- No. of contestants: 13
- Winner: Danielle Evans
- No. of episodes: 13

Release
- Original network: UPN
- Original release: March 7 – May 17, 2006

Additional information
- Filming dates: October 3 – November 23, 2005

Season chronology
- ← Previous; Season 5 Next → Season 7

The sixth cycle of America's Next Top Model, premiered on March 8, 2006, which would be the last cycle to air on UPN before merging with The WB to create The CW. The catchphrase for this cycle was "Fairy Tales Come True." This cycle was filmed from October through November 2005.

The prizes for this cycle were:

- A modeling contract with Ford Models.
- A fashion spread and cover in Elle magazine.
- A US$100,000 contract with CoverGirl cosmetics.

The international destination during this cycle was Bangkok and Phuket, Thailand, the show’s first visit to South East Asia.

The winner was 20-year-old Danielle Evans from Little Rock, Arkansas with Joanie Dodds placing as the runner-up.

== Contestants ==
(Ages stated are at start of contest)

Contestant	Age	Height	Hometown	Finish	Place
Kathy Hoxit	20	5 ft 10 in (1.78 m)	Brevard, North Carolina	Episode 2	13
Wendy Wiltz	22	5 ft 11 in (1.80 m)	New Orleans, Louisiana	Episode 3	12
Kari Schmidt	18	5 ft 8.5 in (1.74 m)	Brookings, South Dakota	Episode 4	11
Gina Choe	21	5 ft 9 in (1.75 m)	Odessa, Florida	Episode 5	10
Mollie Sue Steenis	25	5 ft 9 in (1.75 m)	Tampa, Florida	Episode 6	9
Leslie Mancia	18	5 ft 10 in (1.78 m)	Higley, Arizona	Episode 7	8
Brooke Staricha	22	5 ft 11 in (1.80 m)	Corpus Christi, Texas	Episode 8	7
Nnenna Agba	24	5 ft 7 in (1.70 m)	Houston, Texas	Episode 9	6
Furonda Brasfield	24	6 ft 0 in (1.83 m)	Stuttgart, Arkansas	Episode 11	5
Sara Albert	22	6 ft 1 in (1.85 m)	Davis, California	Episode 12	4
Jade Cole	26	5 ft 9.75 in (1.77 m)	Pittsburgh, Pennsylvania	Episode 13	3
Joanie Dodds	24	5 ft 9 in (1.75 m)	Beaver Falls, Pennsylvania	Episode 13	2
Danielle Evans	20	5 ft 11 in (1.80 m)	Little Rock, Arkansas	Episode 13	1

== Episodes ==
No. overall	No. in season	Title	Original release date	US viewers (millions)
60	1	"The Girl Who Learns How to Dance"	March 8, 2006	5.26
The 32 hopeful contestants were driven to a Pasadena hotel to start a runway challenge, aiming to impress Tyra & the Jays. Memorable contestants included Yvonne, a 27-year-old doctor, who won the catwalk challenge and impressed both of the Jays; Wendy, who revealed that she hasn't been able to speak with her family since they evacuated Hurricane Katrina; Jade, who gave the judges something to talk about after being a little cocky; Joanie, who showed the judges her rebellious side by showing her cage dancer moves, and as well as telling the judges she was the daughter of a preacher and Dani tells the judges over her personality in debates during her audition video. They were then trimmed down to 20 contestants, and they have to participate in their photoshoot. Tyra selected the top 13 contestants to enter the competition. There were many older contestants in this cycle, as 9 out of the 13 contestants were 21 years old and over including Jade who was the only 26-year-old contestant since Robyn Manning of Cycle 1 while Danielle and Kathy were 20 years old and Kari and Leslie were the youngest at 18.
61	2	"The Girls Go Bald"	March 8, 2006	5.26
The top thirteen contestants were taken to Bel Age hotel for an interview challenge with Janice Dickinson. Nnenna won the challenge due to her personality and chose Jade, Gina, and Sara to be the first four to enter the house to choose their bedrooms. The rest of the contestants moved into their house in Los Angeles with four fashion-inspired rooms and one "Top Model" room. Jade claimed she was "the undiscovered supermodel" and declared herself the front runner of the competition. They had dinner together and Gina got over drunk in alcoholism much to the shock of Kathy. The contestants arrived at Warren Tricomi salon and thought they were having makeovers and believed that they would all be shaved bald as a way to level the competition for the photoshoot, when in fact they were fitted with skull caps and posed wearing Swarovski crystals in an array of mannequin heads. Many of the contestants' photos impressed the judges, particularly Nnenna (who received the first call-out), Leslie, Danielle and Sara, who Tyra commended by saying her photo was "one of the best photos in the history of America's Next Top Model." Furonda and Kathy landed in the bottom two, but Kathy was eliminated over Furonda (whose photo Tyra said was the worst in the group) because the judges felt that Kathy looked lost in her photo and had no model potential.: Featured photographers: Jay Lawrence Goldman and Pascal Demeester; Special guests: Janice Dickinson, Ève Salvail, Todd Newton, Trish Moreno, Rolanda Watts, Trey Smith, Tina Frazier, and Sarah Gold
62	3	"The Girl Who is a True Miss Diva"	March 15, 2006	4.87
The top12 contestants were taken back to Warren Tricomi salon and got their makeovers. During the makeover process, Jay spoke with each of the contestants to help them to establish their individual styles, Jade thought she looked bad in short hair and wanted to choose long hair extensions instead. The following day, they participated in the Gen Art Fashion Show and they had to embody in a clothing challenge. Nnenna won her second challenge for her interpretation of the "new African queen," and once again chose Jade and Gina to accompany her for a $5,000 shopping spree at Nanette Lepore. She chose these two because they did not get along and hoped the interaction would help their relationship. For the photoshoot, the contestants posed with ice sculptures. Many girls did well, especially Danielle and Kari. Furonda was commended for her improvement, and Brooke's high fashion look and photo earned her the first call-out. Jade and Wendy ended up in the bottom two. Although Jade made a poor impression with the judges while taking a poor photograph, she was spared over Wendy (whose family had been affected by Hurricane Katrina), who was sent home due to her inability to transfer her modeling potential to photographs, as well as lack of focus.: Featured photographer: Richard Reinsdorf; Special guests: Joel Warren, Edward Tricomi, Naima Mora, and Rachel Zoe; CoverGirl of the Week: Nnenna Agba
63	4	"The Girl Who Kissed a Roach"	March 22, 2006	5.21
This episode featured the top eleven contestants practicing the runway. The contestants had to do a runway with cockroaches for Jared Gold's spring collection. Gina was terrified about the cockroaches while Jade tried to impress the judges by kissing the cockroach at the end of the runway. She won the challenge and picked Danielle, Mollie Sue, Nnenna & Leslie to join her in a trip to the Sheri Bodell fashion show, which was a part of Los Angeles' fashion week. For the photo shoot, the contestants had to take a photo while falling and were dressed as a character from a popular fairy tale. At panel, several contestants tripped or fell during an impromptu Vivienne Westwood style runway challenge, leaving the judges extremely nervous throughout. While Joanie received praise for maintaining a model's walk and her steadiness on the 10-inch heels, Danielle fell twice – the second time which she sprained her toe and was on crutches during panel deliberation, while Kari could barely take a step without falling. Jade (the challenge winner) and Danielle were praised by the judges for having the top photos and were called first and second respectively. Gina and Kari landed in the bottom two. The judges said Gina lacked the confidence she needed to get by as a model. However, Kari, who was considered as one of the front-runners of the competition, was eliminated for her bad photo, her non model-like proportions and for allowing her stumbles on the runway to break her spirit, leaving Gina, as well as the other girls in shock.: Featured photographer: Tracy Bayne; Special guests: Fern Mallis, Sheri Bodell, Sutan Amrull, and Jared Gold; CoverGirl of the Week: Nnenna Agba
64	5	"The Girl Who Kissed a Male Model"	March 29, 2006	4.86
This episode featured the contestants receiving lessons on commercial and high-fashion posing from Janice Dickinson and Lisa D'Amato from Cycle 5. After the lessons, they had a dinner in a Korean restaurant with Janice. Their challenge was to model for a Sears catalog, using the four seasons as their back-drop. Nnenna easily won her third challenge and her prize was the entire wardrobe used for the shoot. Meanwhile, problems between Gina and Jade escalated into an argument at dinner, instigated by Janice. Back at home, Gina finally had enough and stood up for herself. The next day, the contestants met with Tyra during taping of The Tyra Banks Show and discussed the contestants' future goals. Then, they had a photo shoot which involved the contestants posing as their future goals. Nnenna was kissed by the model Vaughn Lowery, with whom she was posing, creating some on-air problems with Nnenna and her boyfriend. At judging, Tyra was impressed the most by Joanie's awesome photo and film, and Leslie, Furonda and Jade also impressed. Mollie Sue’s photo was strong but Tyra warned her for not showing enough of her personality in her film. Tyra then questioned Gina about her stiff performance and Brooke for her stiff film, although she came out with a great shot. In the end, Brooke was deemed to have more potential, while the judges felt that Gina had mentally left the competition.: Featured photographer: Thomas Klementsson; Special guests: Janice Dickinson, Lisa D'Amato, Lawrence Zarian, Russel Baer, Christian Marc, John Thomas, Skyler, Vaughn Lowery, Steven Bruns, and Zane Holtz; CoverGirl of the Week: Danielle Evans
65	6	"The Girl With Two Bad Takes"	April 5, 2006	5.10
The girls spent the week learning about acting and improv. They had a shock at first; while Tyra was talking to them, she suddenly became lightheaded and fainted. All the girls rushed to her aid, but Tyra bounced up and yelled that she staged the faint to show them how to really commit and convince an audience. Furonda was especially distraught by Tyra's trick and the girls then attended a workshop at The Groundlings. Later, the girls put their skills to use in a challenge led by Nick Cannon. Furonda's quick wit impressed Cannon and his friends, and she won a guest role on Veronica Mars. Furonda also won the opportunity to record a nationwide public service announcement about HIV prevention, selecting Nnenna to participate in the filming with her. In place of a photo shoot that week, the girls once again had to utilize their improvisation skills in a commercial shoot for CoverGirl. Most of the girls had flaws in their commercials, but Furonda's overall presence and Sara's confidence stood out and impressed the judges. Mollie Sue and Jade ended up in the bottom two for their bad commercials. Although the judges were turned off by Jade's attitude, Mollie Sue was ultimately eliminated for failing to show any personality in front of panel and for having the worst commercial in the bunch.: Featured commercial director: Michael Rosenthal; Special guests: Nick Cannon, Robert Hoffman, Leonard Robinson, Jeremy Rowley, Marvelyn Brown, Steve Guttenberg, and Charlie Altuna; CoverGirl of the Week: Nnenna Agba
66	7	"The Girl Who Has a Temper"	April 12, 2006	4.40
The contestants learned the "runway twirl" from the Aswirl Twins. They put their knowledge to the test in a church fashion show challenge. Jade and Joanie were the two crowd favorites, but in the end, Jade won a $25,000 diamond ring. Jade then chose Furonda to have a $10,000 diamond ring, who lastly chose Nnenna to have an $8,000 diamond ring. Brooke was mad at Nnenna because she kept using the phone to call her boyfriend, and Brooke ended up lashing out at Nnenna, which surprised some of the girls. The animosity between Brooke and Nnenna began to throw Nnenna off her game. The photo shoot required the girls to "krump," a modern dance style, to advertise Payless shoes. Jade wowed Mr. Jay at the photoshoot by adding something special to the end of the photoshoot. However, it was Joanie's photo that floored the judges. Before deliberation, Tyra demonstrated her signature runway walk and then made a slow, flawless turn, as though on a turntable. Stressing the importance of a signature walk and ease of movement, she then had all the girls follow suit and perform their own walk and turn for the judges. Joanie was praised for her originality in her walk, photoshoot, and her excellent grasp of all that had been taught during the week, and Tyra called her name first. Sara and Leslie wound up in the bottom two for the first time ever as a result of their poor challenge performances as well as weak photos. Lesile (deemed to have more potential) was eliminated for not being a model in person and for having a bad runway walk, posture and overall weak presence.: Featured photographer: Trevor O'Shana; Special guests: Lloyd Klein, Richard Harris, Ron Harris, Tommy the Clown, Sol Rafael, Mai Quynh, Christian Marc, Sutan Amrull, and Roy Campbell; CoverGirl of the Week: Nnenna Agba
67	8	"The Girl Who Has Surgery"	April 19, 2006	4.36
In this week's episode, the contestants were critiqued harshly by an agent (later revealed to be an actress) wanting to test their response under pressure. After the critique, each model took a Polaroid shot to measure how they took the criticism and how it affected their work through their facial expressions. Jade won the challenge because she took the criticism she was given without allowing it to affect her negatively, and chose Nnenna to share in the prize with her, which turned out to be a visit from a loved one. Nnenna's boyfriend (to her dismay) arrived, as well as Jade's mother. The photoshoot was for Pantene had them posing as various types of dolls. After the first photo shoot, the girls all went to the dentist to have their teeth whitened. However, Danielle and Joanie were both offered to have their teeth fixed. Joanie received veneers to fix her "snaggle tooth," and while Danielle was offered the chance to fix the gap between her front teeth, she declined, claiming the gap was a part of who she was. After Joanie had her surgery (which lasted 12 hours), she did not like how her mouth felt. The next day, the girls met Janice, Marc Ecko and Eva Pigford from Cycle 3 for an interview. After the meeting, they had another photo shoot by Tyra, in which each girl was photographed crying after a stick designed to make them cry was applied to their eyes. Joanie returned to the dental clinic for another 6 hours of surgery, leaving her thrilled with her new smile. Joanie impressed the judges especially on both shoots, and Furonda was once again praised for her improvement. Danielle was castigated by Tyra for not capitalizing on the chance to get her teeth fixed but was unanimously praised for her photo, while Sara struggled with both shoots. Despite strong shots, Jade's overall "fakeness" irked the judges and landed her in the bottom two for a third time, but it was ultimately Brooke who was sent home due to her inability to transfer her strong features onto a photo.: Featured photographers: Jim De Yonker and Pascal Demeester; Special guests: Janice Dickinson, Eva Pigford, Marc Ecko, Mitch Stone, Alexander Rankovic, Charlie Altuna, Dr. Edgardo Falcon, Sutan Amrull, Jeff Lorch, Deprise Brescia, Diana Cole (Jade's mother), and John (Nnenna's boyfriend); CoverGirl of the Week: Joanie Dodds
68	9	"The Girl Who Is a Model, Not a Masseuse"	April 26, 2006	4.89
This episode began with a session of press training, in which the top six contestants were taught how to deal with difficult interview questions and given pointers on how to improve. Nnenna won the challenge and received massages administered by the other contestants and picked Jade to share her prize. Danielle, who did not want to have the gap between her front teeth closed, changed her mind at Tyra's urging, in order to attain a more "CoverGirl" smile and compromised by having her gap closed almost fully, leaving it a tiny bit open. Before long, the contestants were taken to a Thai restaurant and met Sutan Amrull, who came in drag impersonating Tyra and Tyra herself told them they would be heading to Bangkok, Thailand for the remainder of the competition. Upon arriving in Bangkok, the girls arrived at their hotel learning about Thai culture. The next day, the girls went to the spa where Nnenna and Jade had a Thai massage as the other girls did administrating. They had a photo shoot in which they were given the assignment to pose hanging upside down from nets as mermaids over an open floating market. This photo shoot was sponsored by Banana Boat sunblock lotion. Joanie, Sara, Jade, and Danielle (who received the first call out) all performed well on this difficult photo shoot. Furonda took good and bad shots and Nnenna struggled to turn out a good shot, ultimately landing both of them in the bottom two. At judging, the girls had to deliver a speech to show off their personalities, with Danielle impressing the judges with her charm. Although Furonda was criticized for dressing too flashy, it was Nnenna who was eliminated in her first ever bottom two appearance after her progress in the competition seemed to plateau and the judges felt she was slipping fast.: Featured photographer: Jaturong Hirankarn; Special guests: Rachel McCallister, George Wayne, Dr. Edgardo Falcon, and Sutan Amrull; CoverGirl of the Week: Joanie Dodds
69	10	"The Girl Who is Going to the Moon"	April 26, 2006	3.37
This episode was an overview of the past nine episodes of the cycle which featured previously unseen footage including a 'behind-the-scenes' look at each of the episodes up to this point. Jade was revealed to have a "secret language" of her own, using made-up words such as "analystic". More insight was given into the argument between Brooke and Nnenna regarding Nnenna's use of the phone, the decision of the judges to keep Gina instead of Kari, which shocked many girls, especially Leslie, and Kathy's quote equating her chance to compete on the show to the odds of her making it to the moon.
70	11	"The Girl Who is Rushed to the Emergency Room"	May 3, 2006	4.29
The top five contestants participated in a challenge by learning and performing an intricate Thai classical dance and perform in front of judges. Furonda unfortunately failed to retain the Thai dancing teacher's instructions, and her performance entertained the Thai audience by making them laugh a lot. Once again, Joanie performed very solidly and ended up winning the challenge. Joanie decided to choose Sara to share in her prize which was a dinner with the fashion editor of Thailand's Elle because Joanie felt bad that Sara hadn't won anything before. Sara expressed some disdain in her interview, saying that Joanie shouldn't have picked her out of pity, she should have been chosen out of want. Danielle was unable to participate in the challenge as she was taken to the hospital for exhaustion, dehydration, and food poisoning, however she left the hospital and was able to return in time for the photoshoot. To arrive at the shoot, the contestants traveled by elephant deep into the jungle, where they posed on the elephants to advertise Gillette Venus razors. Joanie put out a stellar shoot, with creative poses while balancing on the elephant's foot, which impressed the judges and gave her the first call-out for the third time in the competition. Sara tried to copy Joanie's poses, but didn't quite live up to Joanie's execution of them, and the judges criticized her for her lack of creativity in the shoot. Despite that, Sara's photo was very strong and she was called second. Danielle also received great praise for recovering so quickly in her photoshoot, and delivering a gorgeous photograph which did not show any signs of sickness giving her the third call-out. (Note: Danielle being a reason on signs of sickness was briefly mentioned in the next cycle after Monique Calhoun decided not to participate in the photoshoot as a result of being dehydrated and was subsequently eliminated that same week after losing to eventual last eliminated contestant, Eugena Washington.) Jade and Furonda were the bottom two, however Jade was saved for the fourth time for taking great photos and having a very strong determination to win, despite her arrogance and overall bad attitude. Furonda was sent home in her third bottom two appearance due to her inability to take instruction.: Featured photographer: Pongsak Tangtiwaja; Special guests: Patravadi Mejudhon, Sirithon Srichalakom, Petra Sriwaranon, Sutan Amrull, and Siri Udomritthiruj; CoverGirl of the Week: Joanie Dodds
71	12	"The Girls Go to Phuket"	May 10, 2006	4.85
The top four contestants arrived at Temple of the Dawn to meet designer Pichita Rucksajit, who sent them to four go-sees. They were given ฿2,500 each to buy presents for the designers (to comply with Thai customs). The notorious traffic jam in Bangkok delayed all of them on their way back. All of the contestants were late returning from their go-sees, and when they finally finished, Rucksajit announced that because of their tardiness, they all disqualified themselves from the prize (a line of Thai dresses), although it was announced Danielle would have won had she been on time. This was the first time in the Top Model history that neither contestant won the challenge. The Tyra Mail after the challenge said that they were going to the island of Phuket. The next morning, Tyra came to visit them and told them the story about the 2004 tsunami. Ocean Pacific, Elle Girl and Amp'd Mobile sponsoring the week's photo shoot at the beach to watch the contestants take pictures and they flew back to Bangkok later that day. At judging, Jade finally won the recognition of Nigel Barker who said her picture was great and that he enjoyed filming her. Joanie's photo was praised as well. Danielle's pose in the picture was criticized because it was suitable for a men's magazine, and not Elle Girl, a women's magazine. Danielle's accent remained a problem unsolved and the judges wondered if she could be articulate enough to be a model for CoverGirl, landing Danielle in the bottom two for the first time. Although she had a strong photo and put in a commendable effort towards improving as a model throughout the competition, Sara become the tenth contestant sent home.: Featured photographer: Nigel Barker; Special guests: Kai Kawtong, Rai von Bueren, Christy Bayle, Eric Crane, Pichita Rucksajit, Jui Rongnarangsin, and Disaya Prakobsantisukh; CoverGirl of the Week: Danielle Evans
72	13	"The Girl Who Walked Through the Ancient City"	May 17, 2006	5.86
Jay Manuel visited the top three contestants, and informed them that they would be doing both a photo shoot and a commercial for CoverGirl Lash Exact mascara the next day. Jade, who did not memorize her lines, improvised to such an extent that she irritated Jay. Jade then had to read her lines off cue cards. Joanie performed well in her commercial, despite struggling with her new teeth, while Danielle fumbled with her lines and was very self-conscious of her accent. After their commercials, the contestants did their photo shoots. At judging, Jade's photograph was praised but her commercial was criticized. The judges also criticized Jade's tendency to be too outspoken. Joanie's commercial and photograph were well received. Danielle's photograph also received positive feedback. Her commercial, however, received criticism from Tyra and Twiggy because of her prominent Southern accent. After deliberation, Joanie was called first, leaving Danielle and Jade in the bottom two. In the end, Jade was eliminated in her fifth bottom two appearance despite having a strong portfolio.: Featured photographer: Jim De Yonker; Danielle and Joanie would be walking in an elaborate fashion show, for Roj Singhakul's fashion show for his line Issue, with a set replicated to look like an ancient city with temples and a winding runway over water. Danielle was told that she appeared bored when she walked, while Joanie looked down too much. The finalists' photographs from past shoots were judged side by side, and great emphasis was made in Twiggy preferring Joanie and Nigel going for Danielle. However, the judges agreed that the two young finalists have had the strongest and most consistent pictures of this cycle and that they were the strongest portfolios of any final 2 in the show's history. Ultimately, Danielle's personality and presence edged out over Joanie's. The finalists returned and Tyra announced Danielle as the sixth winner of America's Next Top Model.: Special guests: Charlie Altuna, Sutan Amrull, Roj Singhakul, and Priyanuk Puntong

== Summaries ==
=== Call-out order ===
Order	Episodes												
Order	1	2	3	4	5	6	7	8	9	11	12	13	
1	Jade	Nnenna	Brooke	Jade	Furonda	Furonda	Joanie	Joanie	Danielle	Joanie	Joanie	Joanie	Danielle
2	Sara	Sara	Danielle	Danielle	Joanie	Sara	Jade	Furonda	Jade	Sara	Jade	Danielle	Joanie
3	Mollie Sue	Leslie	Nnenna	Brooke	Danielle	Leslie	Nnenna	Nnenna	Sara	Danielle	Danielle	Jade	
4	Leslie	Joanie	Kari	Joanie	Leslie	Danielle	Furonda	Sara	Joanie	Jade	Sara		
5	Joanie	Kari	Furonda	Mollie Sue	Jade	Nnenna	Danielle	Danielle	Furonda	Furonda			
6	Nnenna	Danielle	Gina	Sara	Mollie Sue	Joanie	Brooke	Jade	Nnenna				
7	Kari	Jade	Mollie Sue	Furonda	Sara	Brooke	Sara	Brooke					
8	Brooke	Mollie Sue	Leslie	Leslie	Nnenna	Jade	Leslie						
9	Danielle	Brooke	Sara	Nnenna	Brooke	Mollie Sue							
10	Kathy	Gina	Joanie	Gina	Gina								
11	Furonda	Wendy	Jade	Kari									
12	Gina	Furonda	Wendy										
13	Wendy	Kathy											

The contestant was eliminated
The contestant won the competition

=== Bottom two ===
Episode	Contestants	Eliminated
2	Furonda & Kathy	Kathy
3	Jade & Wendy	Wendy
4	Gina & Kari	Kari
5	Brooke & Gina	Gina
6	Jade & Mollie Sue	Mollie Sue
7	Leslie & Sara	Leslie
8	Brooke & Jade	Brooke
9	Furonda & Nnenna	Nnenna
11	Furonda & Jade	Furonda
12	Danielle & Sara	Sara
13	Danielle & Jade	Jade
13	Danielle & Joanie	Joanie

The contestant was eliminated after their first time in the bottom two
The contestant was eliminated after their second time in the bottom two
The contestant was eliminated after their third time in the bottom two
The contestant was eliminated after their fifth time in the bottom two
The contestant was eliminated in the final judging and placed as the runner-up

=== Average call-out order ===
Casting call-out order and final two are not included.

Rank by average	Place	Model	Call-out total	Number of call-outs	Call-out average
1	2	Joanie	35	11	3.18
2	1	Danielle	36	11	3.27
3	4	Sara	46	10	4.60
4	3	Jade	51	11	4.63
5	5	Furonda	42	9	4.67
6	6	Nnenna	38	8	4.75
7	8	Leslie	34	6	5.67
8	7	Brooke	42	7	6.00
9	11	Kari	20	3	6.67
10	9	Mollie Sue	35	5	7.00
11	10	Gina	36	4	9.00
12	12	Wendy	23	2	11.50
13	13	Kathy	13	1	13.00

=== Photo shoot guide ===
- Episode 2 photo shoot: Bald covered in Swarovski crystals
- Episode 3 photo shoot: Ice princesses in a magazine
- Episode 4 photo shoot: Falling fairy tale princesses
- Episode 5 photo shoot: Future Careers with male models
- Episode 6 Commercial: CoverGirl Clean Liquid Foundation at a pool party
- Episode 7 photo shoot: Krumping
- Episode 8 photo shoots: Dolls; emotional black & white beauty shots
- Episode 9 photo shoot: Mermaids hanging in the Floating Market
- Episode 11 photo shoot: Posing on an elephant for Venus razors
- Episode 12 photo shoot: Ocean Pacific swimwear on the beaches of Phuket
- Episode 13 photo shoot & commercial: CoverGirl lash exact mascara commercial and print ad

=== Makeovers ===
- Wendy - Volumized curls with honey blonde highlights
- Kari - Brigitte Bardot inspired big curls with bangs
- Gina - Cut to shoulder length and angles added
- Mollie Sue - Mia Farrow inspired pixie cut
- Leslie - Long wavy dark brown extensions
- Brooke - Gisele Bundchen inspired blonde highlights
- Nnenna - Buzzed
- Furonda - Tiffany Richardson inspired long straight black weave
- Sara - Brigitte Nielsen inspired cut and dyed platinum blonde
- Jade - Cut short and dyed golden blonde with matching eyebrows
- Joanie - Dyed ice blonde; later, snaggletooth removed and porcelain crowns added
- Danielle - Extra-long wavy black weave; later, front tooth gap adjusted

== Trivia ==
- On The Tyra Banks Show, Tyra revealed to Kathy (with the top six girls) that she was "outvoted" the night Kathy was eliminated from the show.
