= Debbe Magnusen =

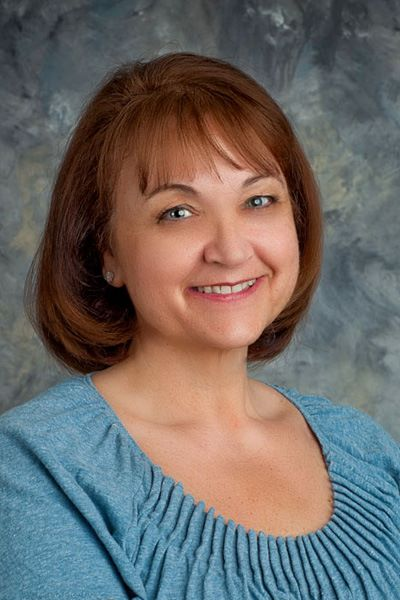
- Debbe Magnusen in 2011
- Born: Debbe Magnusen; January 6, 1956 (age 70); Pasadena, California, U.S.

Debbe Magnusen (born January 6, 1956, in Pasadena, California), in July 1994, founded the non-profit organization Project Cuddle based out of Costa Mesa, California. Magnusen was a foster mother to over 30 drug-exposed children, while raising two biological children. Five of those children were eventually adopted by Magnusen and her family. She is the author of the non-fiction books Don't Abandon Your Baby and It's Never Dull!!. Don't Abandon Your Baby tells the stories of babies who were nearly abandoned, but saved through working with Magnusen and her non-profit organization Project Cuddle. It's Never Dull talks about true stories of drug exposed babies and how to care for them, as well as the foster care system.

== Awards and honors ==
Magnusen's work with babies and their mothers has earned her numerous honors and awards including

- A 1996 Olympic Torchbearer as a "Local Community Hero"
- CBS "Whats Right with Southern California Community Service Award" - 1997
- Freedom Foundation at Valley Forge Medal - 1997
- Freeman, Freeman, & Smiley Philanthropist of the Year Award - 1998
- Received Points of Light award #1157 - July 10, 1998
- Congressional Angel in Adoption Award - 2003
- National Day of Philanthropy "Founder of the Year" Award - 2004
- Disney Show Your Character Award - 2005
- Leadership Tomorrow Community Leadership Award - 2005
- Clarins Most Dynamic Woman Award - 2006
- Featured in People in the article "Heroes Among Us" - 2007
- Received a resolution from the 37th State Senate District of California that recognized July 13, 2013 as Baby Abandonment Prevention Awareness day from State Senator Mimi Walters.
