= Jade Cole =

American model

- Born: Jade Chantel Cole; June 19, 1979 (age 47); Pittsburgh, Pennsylvania, U.S.
- Other name: Jade Rodan
- Occupation: Model
- Years active: 1994–present
- Known for: America's Next Top Model Season 6
- Modeling information
- Height: 5 ft 9 in (1.75 m)
- Agency: Elite Model Management; Diva Models, Singapore; Dream Models, Hong Kong; Uber-Warning Models, LA; VMH Models, Vancouver; SMG Models, Seattle

Jade Chantel Cole (born June 19, 1979) is an American fashion and print model and former reality television personality. She first appeared on Cycle 6 of America's Next Top Model. She is the founder of Biracial Butterfly Productions, an agency that represents models with biracial ethnicity.

In 2018, Marie Claire named Cole as one of the best 24 contestants of all time on ANTM, ranking her as number six, followed by Pop Culture naming her one of the "Hottest Reality TV Villains" in 2019.

== Early life ==
Cole was born in Pittsburgh, Pennsylvania, and she is of mixed ethnicity: her father is African-American, and her mother is Dutch. Though her ambiguous ethnicity initially caused her annoyance when people questioned her about it, she learned to use it to her advantage in her modeling career.

== Career ==
Before appearing on ANTM, Cole was a Kindergarten teacher in Philadelphia. In early March 2006, cycle 6 of America's Next Top Model aired on UPN. Cole was one of the thirteen female contestants, eventually becoming the last eliminated in the competition. Joanie Dodds took runner-up and Danielle Evans ended up winning the cycle. During her tenure on the show, Cole was described as "obnoxious, self-absorbed, and flamboyant" and "arrogant... and one of ANTM's greatest villains." E! News called Cole one of the "two biggest bitches in the history of the show." In response, Cole has stated that she felt ANTM was a "misrepresentation", an "inaccurate performance" and that she had been exploited. Entertainment Weekly included her in their list of favorite contestants and worst makeovers.

Cole stated that she had turned down America's Next Top Model cycle 17, "The All Stars", citing contract issues. In an interview, Cole stated, "As much as I would have loved to be back on TV, I felt I possibly would be misrepresented if appearing on [Season] 17. [It's basically] signing your rights and life hypothetically away... Reality shows frequently portray a modified and highly influenced form of reality. [We're] often persuaded to act in specific scripted ways by off-screen 'story editors' or 'segment television producers,' with the portrayal of events and speech manipulated and contrived to create an illusion of reality through direction and post-production editing techniques."

Cole signed with a number of agencies after her appearance on ANTM, including: Diva Models, based in Singapore; Dream Models, based in Hong Kong; Uber-Warning Models, based in Los Angeles; VMH Models, based in Vancouver; and SMG Models, based in Seattle. She also signed a contract with Elite Model Management.

Cole has partnered with Casa de Amparo, an organization that aims to treat and prevent child abuse and neglect.

== Filmography ==
=== Television ===
| Date | Title | Episode | Note |
|---|---|---|---|
| 2013 | Fashion News Live | 11.25 | Self |
| 2006 | The Tyra Banks Show | Top Model Premiere Party | Self |
| 2006 | America's Next Top Model (cycle 6) | All 13 episodes | Self |
| 1994 | The Word | 5.10 | Self |

=== Music videos ===
| Date | Title | Artist |
|---|---|---|
| 2009 | "Digital Girl" | Jamie Foxx |
| 2007 | "Go On Girl" | Ne-Yo |
| 2003 | "Change Clothes" | Jay-Z |
