= Anchal Joseph =

American model (born 1987)

- Born: January 3, 1987 (age 39); New Delhi, India
- Modeling information
- Height: 5 ft 11 in (180 cm)
- Hair color: Black
- Eye color: Brown
- Agency: Elite Miami, State Management, MMG New York

Anchal Joseph (born January 3, 1987) is an Indian fashion model and actress. She is best known for participating in the seventh season of America's Next Top Model in 2006, as well as appearing on Deal or No Deal as a briefcase model in the 2018 CNBC re-boot. She was also featured in the pages of Vogue Paris, and made appearances on the television series White Collar, Gossip Girl, and Royal Pains.

== Early life ==
Anchal was born in New Delhi, India, but her family moved to Miami, Florida, when she was six years old, shortly after Hurricane Andrew struck the area. Her mother was a nurse. Anchal was nineteen years old when she was scouted to try out for America's Next Top Model, Cycle 7; prior to ANTM she had also modelled for Zoom Magazine and French Vogue.

== America's Next Top Model ==
Joseph was the sixth contestant (after Melrose Bickerstaff, Jaeda Young, Michelle Babin, Eugena Washington and Brooke Miller) to be selected to participate on the seventh cycle of America's Next Top Model and was told at casting by host Tyra Banks that she was one of the most physically beautiful contestants to ever participate in the competition. While she was often praised for the quality of her portfolio, her lack of self-confidence was often noted by the judging panel. Over her stay, Joseph was voted CoverGirl of the Week by the viewers twice in a row. She received one second call-out and one third call-out. After refusing to fully participate in a challenge that required her to perform a task while portraying a random emotion (dance aggressively), the judges eliminated Joseph seventh in Los Angeles during her only ever bottom two appearance which Michelle Babin had survived for the first time ever. Joseph stirred some controversy when she made comments about the fact that people with lighter hair, skin or eyes were perceived as better looking in India, when asked about her blue contacts by Tyra Banks, and that she wanted to persevere through those stereotypes.

== Modeling and acting career ==
Joseph has been featured in the pages of Vogue Paris and ZOOM Magazine.

She has made appearances and had roles between 2010 and 2011 on White Collar, Gossip Girl and Royal Pains.

She has also taken part in action to promote AIDS prevention.

In July 2018, Joseph took part in filming for a new version of Deal or No Deal, for broadcast by CNBC; she carried briefcase #22.

After ANTM Joseph signed with photographer Manny Roman who helped her take another step into her modelling and acting career, booking her for Night Weekly Magazine, Artemis Allure Models Magazine, I AM CERA show / FUNKSHION Fashion week, Lila Nikole Show / Rock Fashion Week, Red Dress Fashion Show to benefit the American Heart Association at the Setai Hotel in South Beach as part of Funkshion Fashion Week. He also booked her to co-host SFL Live with Kristin Anderson. Roman no longer represents Joseph and has placed her with MEGA Models Miami. She has modeled for Sofi Swimwear. She has also taken part in several Miami Fashion Weeks.

She is slated to appear in Halogen TV's "Nobel Exchange," as well as in a role in director Garry Marshall's movie New Year's Eve.
