= Pretty Wicked =

- Starring: CariDee English
- Country of origin: United States
- No. of episodes: 8

Production
- Running time: 60 minutes

Original release
- Network: Oxygen
- Release: March 31, 2009 – August 31, 2010

Pretty Wicked is a reality show on the Oxygen Network. The series challenges 10 women to put looks aside and compete to see who is the most beautiful on the inside. The winner receives a grand prize of $50,000. The show is hosted by Caridee English, winner of America's Next Top Model. The girls are judged by three celebrity judges: plus-sized model and published author Mia Tyler, Beverly Hills psychotherapist and radio talk show host Dr. Jenn Berman, and comedian/author Kyle Cease.

== Contestants ==
- Host: Caridee English
- Judge: Mia Tyler
- Judge: Kyle Cease
- Judge: Dr. Jenn Berman

Name	Episode Eliminated	Type
Sarah Cooley	Episode 8 Winner	Total Liar
Sarah Rosselli	Episode 8 (Runner-Up)	Full of It
Katie Krause	Episode 8 (2nd Runner-Up)	
Ana Vuletic	Episode 7 (Quit)	Frenemy
Amber Deylon	Episode 6	Hot Mess
Reena Hawley	Episode 5	Piece of Work
Qui Okoroji	Episode 4	Pure Evil
Vanessa "Marie" Haraskewicz	Episode 3 (Quit)	So Fake
Jennifer "Julin" Guhlin	Episode 2	Backstabber
Jillian Hallman	Episode 1	Major Diva

== Episode progress ==
#	Contestants	Episodes							
#	Contestants	1	2	3	4	5	6	7	8
1	Sarah C	SAFE	SAFE	SAFE	WIN	BTM 3	BTM 2	WIN	WIN
2	Sarah R	SAFE	BTM 2	SAFE	SAFE	SAFE	SAFE	BTM 2	BURN
3	Katie	SAFE	SAFE	BTM 3	BTM 2	SAFE	BTM 3	WIN	BURN
4	Ana	BTM 2	SAFE	SAFE	SAFE	BTM 2	WIN	QUIT	
5	Amber	SAFE	BTM 3	SAFE	BTM 3	SAFE	BURN		
6	Reena	BTM 3	SAFE	BTM 3	SAFE	BURN			
7	Qui	SAFE	SAFE	BTM 3	BURN				
8	Vanessa	SAFE	WIN	QUIT					
9	Julin	WIN	BURN						
10	Jillain	BURN							

The contestant won Pretty Wicked.
The contestant was the Runner-Up
The contestant won immununity from elimination.
The contestant won the challenge, but did not receive immunity.
The contestant was safe from elimination.
The contestant was in the bottom 3.
The contestant was in the bottom 2.
The contestant was eliminated.
The contestant quit the competition.
The contestant won immunity, but quit the competition.
The contestant quit, but then returned for elimination and was in the bottom 3.

- In Episode 3 Katie, Qui and Reena were chosen as the bottom three, but due to Vanessa's withdrawal, there was no bottom two and none of them went home.
- Episodes 7 and 8 were part of the two-hour Season Finale.

== Episode review ==
=== Episode 1: Mirror Mirror Not On The Wall ===
- Challenge: Talk to blind guys
- Challenge Winner/Immunity: Julin
- Bottom 3: Reena, Ana, Jillian
- Eliminated: Jillian

=== Episode 2: Sell Your Soul ===
- Challenge: Auction off their stuff
- Challenge Winner/Immunity: Team 1 Reena, Qui, and Vanessa but immunity was chosen by Reena and Qui to go to Vanessa.
- Quit: Amber (She returned for elimination)
- Bottom 3: Amber, Sarah R., Julin
- Eliminated: Julin

=== Episode 3: Slow Roasted ===
- Challenge: Comedy Roast
- Challenge Winner/Immunity: Vanessa
- Bottom 3: Sarah R., Qui, Reena
- Quit: Vanessa

=== Episode 4: You're it Girl ===
- Challenge: Slash Challenge & Interview by Pat O'Brien
- Challenge Winner/Immunity: Sarah C.
- Bottom 3: Katie, Amber, Qui
- Eliminated: Qui

=== Episode 5: In Frenemy Territory ===
- Challenge: Fake Rescue Mission
- Challenge Winner no one
- Bottom 3: Ana, Sarah C., Reena
- Eliminated: Reena

=== Episode 6: The Truth About Lies ===
- Challenge: Lie Detector Test
- Challenge Winner: Ana
- Bottom 2: Amber, Sarah C.
- Eliminated: Amber

=== Episode 7: Who Wins? (Part 1) ===
- Challenge: Night on the town with aged make-up.
- Challenge Winners: Sarah C., Katie
- Bottom two: Ana & Sarah R.
- Quit: Ana

=== Episode 8: Who Wins? (Part 2) ===
- Challenge: Watching audition tape then writing a letter to "old" self
- Second Runner-Up: Katie
- Runner-Up: Sarah R.
- Winner: Sarah C.
