= Project Cuddle =

U.S. nonprofit organization

- Company type: Non-Profit
- Founded: 1994 in Orange County, California
- Founder: Debbe Magnusen
- Key people: Debbe Magnusen (Founder and CEO); John Stamos (National Spokesperson); Ed Idell (Board President)
- Revenue: 102,501 United States dollar (2022)
- Total assets: 19,645 United States dollar (2022)
- Website: projectcuddle.org

Project Cuddle is a nationwide California-based non-profit organization dedicated to preventing baby abandonment. It works with pregnant women in distress to provide shelter, to give guidance to find medical and prenatal care, and to help find adoptive families. Its national spokesperson is actor John Stamos. The Believe Campaign was created by Project Cuddle, It was created to spread awareness to American teens about the "Safe Haven" laws. Project Cuddle along with celebrities John Stamos and Denise Richards have helped to create an educational video that is available to distribute for free to Health clinics and schools. It operates a 24/7 toll-free hotline which treats all calls as confidential. Project Cuddle and its founder, Debbe Magnusen, were featured in a People magazine article in February 2007 in the popular column Heroes Among Us, on The Oprah Winfrey Show in April 2000, and again on a special "Cheers To You!" episode on May 9, 2007. The organization has also been featured on ABC News, CBS News, and Dateline Houston.

== History ==
Project Cuddle was formed as a 501(c)(3) non-profit charity in 1994 by Debbe Magnusen after having the realization that every day babies were being abandoned around the world by mothers of all ages. She started Project Cuddle in her living room in Costa Mesa, California, with the goal of ending baby abandonment as well as giving care and support to pregnant women. Within 12 hours of opening their 24-hour hotline to callers, they received their first call from a young mother. The California State Auditor reported that 404 babies were abandoned in California alone between 2001 and 2007. As of August 2015 the volunteers and employees of Project Cuddle have saved 786 babies from being abandoned and provided the mothers with alternatives.

== Awards ==
- Disneyland Show Your Character Award - 2005
- Received a resolution from the 37th State Senate District of California that recognized July 13, 2013, as Baby Abandonment Prevention Awareness day from State Senator Mimi Walters.
