= Hair Wars =

Hair fashion event

- Status: Active
- Genre: Touring Hair Show
- Location: Detroit
- Inaugurated: 1985
- Founder: David Humphries
- Most recent: 2024
- Next event: 2025

Hair Wars is an annual touring event which has become one of the biggest hair shows in the United States.

== History ==
Hair Wars was started in Detroit in 1991 by David Humphries (a.k.a. Hump the Grinder) as a hair show for black people. Humphries was a DJ and started to organize a hair show to add a show to his sessions. The event began touring nationally in 1994 and has a circuit of about ten cities including Los Angeles, Las Vegas, Miami and New York City.

"Hair Wars The Supreme Salon Tour" Top SALONS compete down the RUNWAY for the title "Supreme Salon" in a THEMED runway show that is judged and awarded. This show produced by Windy City Media's entertainment director, Benjamin Moline and marketing director, Dan Baron. Hosted by celebrity hair stylist Ben Mollin, from the hit BRAVO TV show "Shear Genius". The top three salons in each city will move on to a National Finals that are held in Las Vegas.

The show was halted during the covid outbreak and returned in 2022. In February 2025, a Hair Wars demo was showcased at the Detroit Institute of Arts.

== Description ==
Hair Wars is a showcase for artists and salons to create unconventional, elaborate, vibrant hair styles and fashion ("ingenuity and flamboyance" as per Metro Times) using primarily human hair as the medium. Each hair designer organizes a show to showcase their styles. Noteworthy creations include a web spider head piece by Kevin Carter, a flying "hairy-copter" by Mr. Little, and a full Vegas showgirl outfit by Lisa B. Teddie “the Braid Artist” Nairobi, “Weaven” Steven Noss, and Keith Matthews were among the prominent participants.

Hair Wars holds an annual edition in New York City at the Moma PS1, in Baltimore and in Atlanta.

In parallel to the organization of the touring event, Humphries' Hair Wars activities include the Hair Wars Beauty School Showdown (school) and the Hair Wars Ad Agency (marketing).

== Bibliography ==
- Lenander, Johanna; Yellen, David (1 November 2007). Hair Wars. PowerHouse Books. ISBN 978-1576873991.

== Filmography ==
- Dosunmu, Andrew (1999). Hot Irons.
- Kimbell, Regina; Bluemke, Jay (2010). My Nappy Roots: A Journey Through Black Hair-itage.

== See also ==
- African American hair
- Hair Show (2004 film)
