= Akademiks =

American brand of streetwear clothing

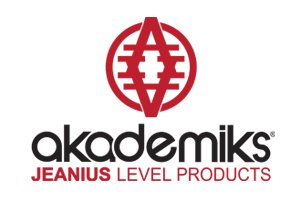
- Product type: Streetwear clothing
- Country: United States
- Introduced: 1999; 27 years ago
- Ambassadors: Dutchess and Ceaser
- Website: Official site

Akademiks (an intentional misspelling of "academics") is an American brand of streetwear clothing popular with devotees of hip hop music, art and fashion. The label was founded by two brothers, Donwan and Emmett Harrell, along with a group of partners.

Akademiks has collaborated with Dutchess and Ceaser, the stars of VH1's Black Ink Crew, on a line of streetwear and hats.

Akademiks has gained popularity in the clothing industry due to the number of celebrities who wear the brand.

== Background ==
In 1999, the Harrell brothers founded Akademiks with the aid of Elliot Betesh, a co-founder of Dr. Jay's clothing stores. The name Akademiks was based on their conviction that education is essential.

When first created, the brand was considered up-market street wear, sold in high-end stores such as Macy's, but in the 2020s (after the Covid-19 pandemic) is mostly sold online shopping.
