= Eugena Washington =

American model (born 1984)

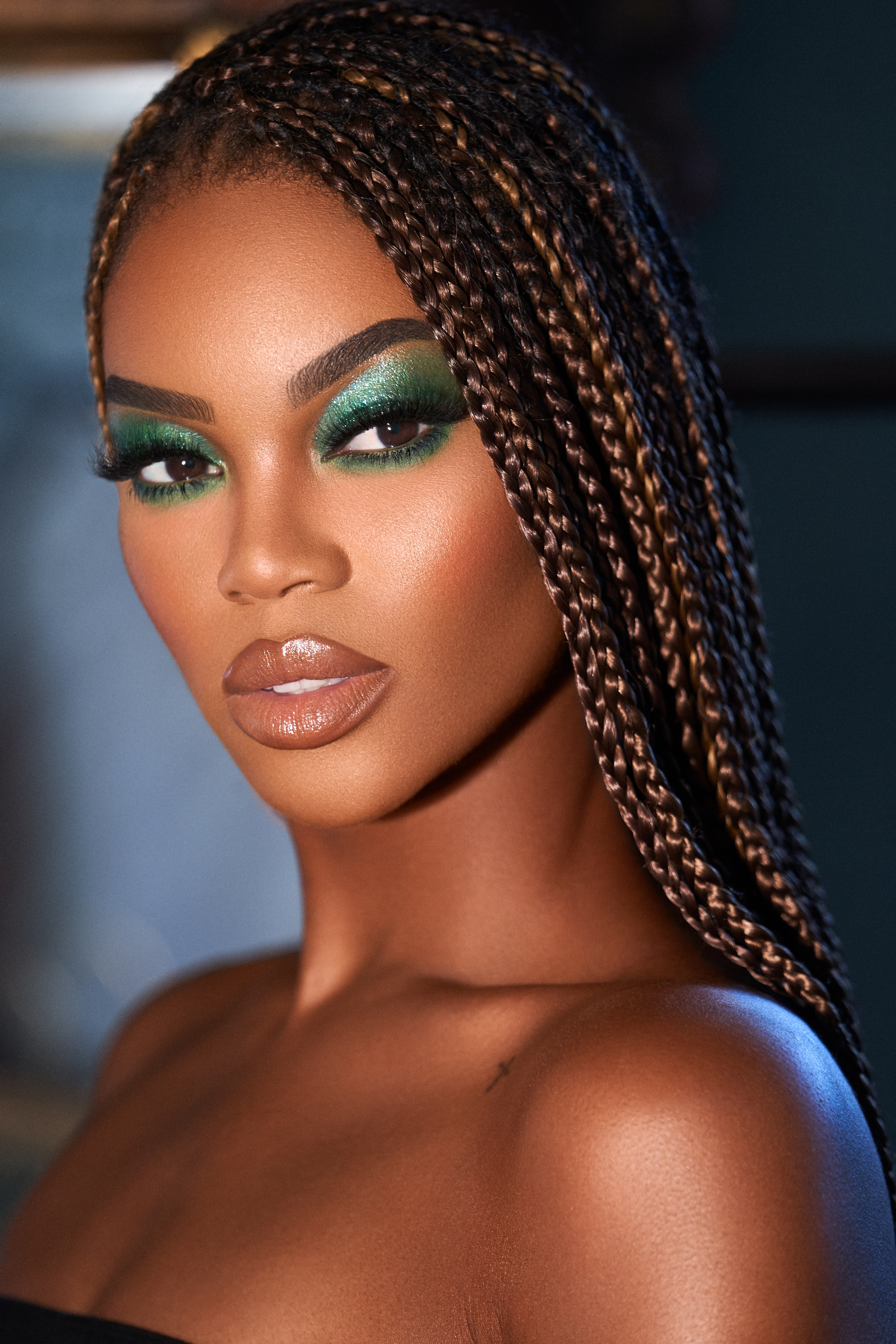
- Washington in 2020

Playboy centerfold appearance
- December 2015
- Preceded by: Rachel Harris
- Succeeded by: Amberleigh West

Playboy Playmate of the Year
- 2016
- Preceded by: Dani Mathers
- Succeeded by: Brook Power

Personal details
- Born: October 8, 1984 Columbia, South Carolina, United States
- Height: 5 ft 10 in (1.78 m)

Eugena Washington is an American model and actress. She was the last contestant eliminated on season 7 of America's Next Top Model. She was the third African American Playboy Playmate of the Year, and was the last one to be announced by Hugh Hefner at the Playboy Mansion.

== Early life ==
Washington was born in 1984 in Columbia, South Carolina, United States, where she grew up. She has a brother, and her father worked for the Southern Christian Leadership Conference. She says that her mother raised 8 children.

== Career ==
=== America's Next Top Model ===
In 2006, Washington was the fourth (after Melrose Bickerstaff, Jaeda Young and Michelle Babin) contestant to be selected for the seventh season of America's Next Top Model. Over her stay, Washington received one first call-out and survived the bottom two twice over Monique Calhoun and Brooke Miller who were both eliminated in their only ever bottom two appearance upon Washington's stay. She also won three challenges where two of them Washington selected CariDee English and Jaeda Young to join her for an photoshoot after winning the Covergirl challenge and Amanda Babin after winning the flamenco dancing challenge. The judges eliminated Washington eleventh (finishing third in overall rank) in Barcelona during her third collective bottom two appearance which Melrose Bickerstaff had survived for the second time round (the first being over Christian Evans who was the first eliminee) after CariDee English was selected to be the first finalist and eventually won.

Washington cracked her knee during the show, and said later that "The show left a trail of very hurt young girls who really had to overcome a lot of self-esteem and self-worth issues".

Washington appeared in a Top Models in Action segment during an episode of Cycle 11.

=== Playboy ===
Washington was the Playboy Playmate of the Month for December 2015 and Playmate of the Year 2016. She was the third African American to be so named. She was the first Playmate of the Year after Playboy eliminated its centerfold. In May, 2016, she was the last Playmate of the Year to be announced by Hugh Hefner at the Playboy Mansion.

Playboy published a new centerfold spread of Washington in 2020. She said that she hoped that the photos would inspire other women to feel more confident about their bodies, not shame.

=== Acting ===
Washington had a recurring role on The Bold and the Beautiful and appeared in The Perfect Match (2016). She played Detective Nicole Miller alongside Gary Leroi Gray in the 2021 TV-series Trace.

=== Other ===
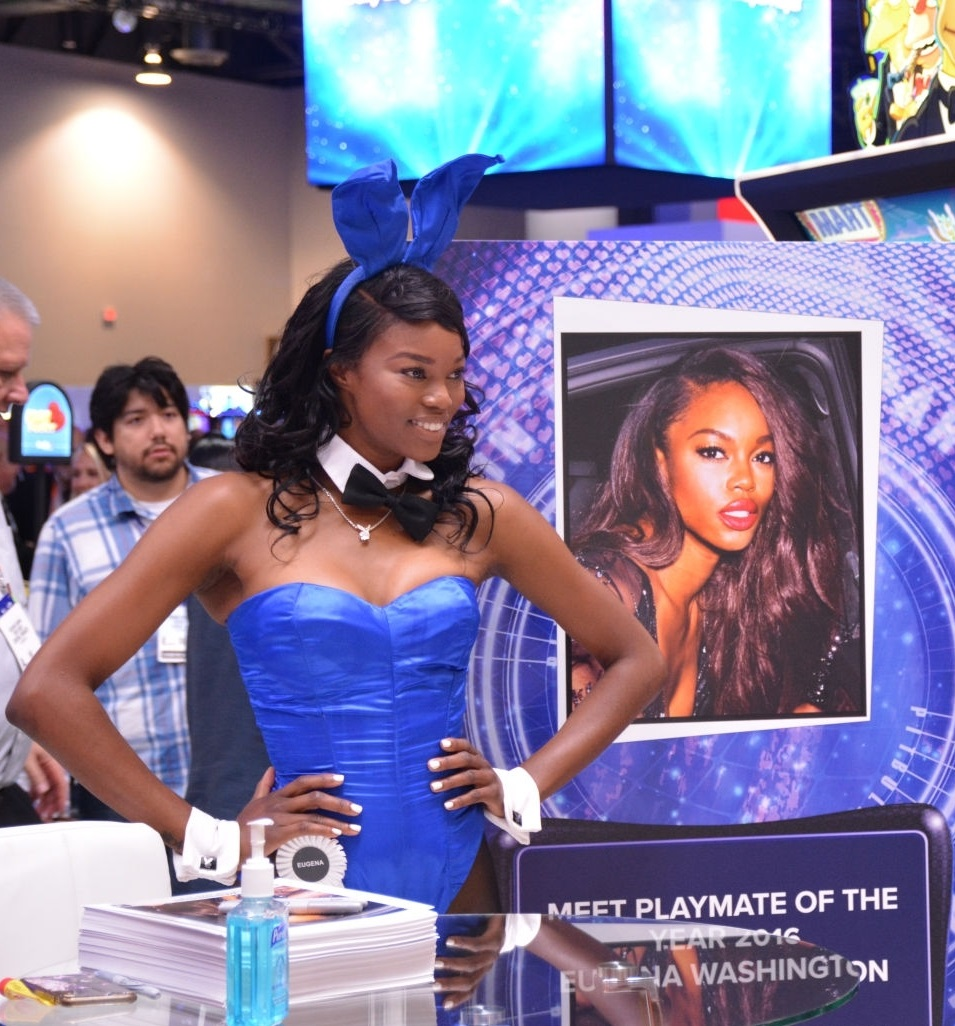
Washington in 2016

She appeared in the 2010 music video of rapper B.o.B's single "Nothin' on You". Washington also appears in a McDonald's cafe commercial along with American R&B artist Dwele. She was named one of the influencers for the Cîroc "Lets Get It" Campaign in 2016.

As of 2019, she was developing a podcast and a haircare line.
