= Lisa Ramos =

Lisa Ramos may refer to:

- a character in Man on Fire (2004 film)
- a contestant in America's Next Top Model (season 13)
