= McKey Sullivan =

American model (born 1988)

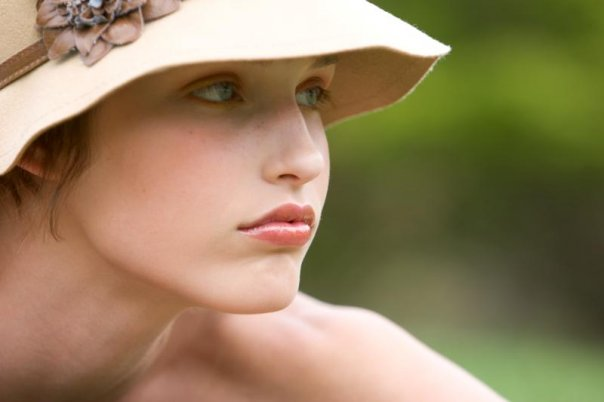
- Born: Brittany Sullivan; September 9, 1988 (age 38); Lake Forest, Illinois, U.S.
- Education: Ripon College
- Spouse: Sam Alvey (m. 2013)
- Children: 5
- Modeling information
- Height: 6 ft 0 in (1.83 m)
- Hair color: Brown
- Eye color: Blue
- Agency: Elite Models

Brittany "McKey" Alvey (née Sullivan; born September 9, 1988) is an American fashion model most notable as the winner of the eleventh cycle of America's Next Top Model.

== Early life ==
Sullivan was born to Michael and Gayle Sullivan and has three siblings, Bridgette, Jimmy, and Mikey. She is a graduate of Lake Forest High School and attended Ripon College where she majored in government and chemical biology and was a member of Alpha Delta Pi sorority. She also trains in mixed martial arts with her husband, Sam Alvey. She was known for appearing at the Bristol Renaissance Faire, which inspired her medieval fashion sense. Sullivan got into modeling when she tried out for Elite Model Look following a sports injury and won the regional division of the competition.

== America's Next Top Model ==
=== America's Next Top Model Cycle 11 ===
At the age of 19, Sullivan was the eighth contestant to be selected to participate on the eleventh cycle of America's Next Top Model against thirteen other contestants, ultimately winning the competition. Two other contestants named Brittany (or some variation) also competed in the same Cycle, so whilst Brittany Rubalcaba kept her first name, Sullivan and Brittney (later going by "Sharaun") Brown changed their names for the show. Sullivan chose "McKey" since her Mother was considering naming her McKenzie when she was born and since it was her penname in high school. She plans on continuing to use the name beyond this television season. Sullivan came into the competition with shoulder-length bright red hair however that was changed to short black hair during the makeovers. Over her stay, Sullivan became one of the front-runners, winning two challenges, receiving two first call-outs and never placed below fifth. During the go-see challenge in Amsterdam, Sullivan was booked by all of the four designers that she met, although she was disqualified from the challenge when she returned to the agency outside of the time limit and lost to Analeigh Tipton who was booked by all of the three designers that she met. Sullivan would have won this challenge had she been on time. She went on to beat Samantha Potter for the title. Sullivan became the second winner to never have a bottom two appearance, with Jaslene Gonzalez being the first. This record was succeeded by Nicole Fox, Krista White, Sophie Sumner, Jourdan Miller and India Gants. As part of the ANTM prize package awarded to her, Sullivan appeared on the cover of Seventeen Magazine with a 6-page editorial and received a contract with CoverGirl cosmetics and a contract for representation with Elite Model Management. She will be featured in Wal-Mart campaign, as well as in the national CoverGirl campaign ads. Her win also comprises a billboard in Times Square.

=== America's Next Top Model Cycle 12 ===
Sullivan appeared as a guest in a Cycle 12 episode where the top eight contestants did their first CoverGirl in groups of four.

After Aminat Ayinde was eliminated, Sullivan appeared in the season finale of Cycle 12 to participate in the final runway show with, Teyona Anderson and Allison Harvard.

=== America's Next Top Model Cycle 13 ===
Sullivan appeared in a Top Models in Action segment during an episode of Cycle 13.

== Career ==
=== Print/online work ===
Sullivan was featured in the December 2008 issue of In Touch Weekly. She appeared on the cover and had a spread in the February 2009 issue of Seventeen magazine as part of her ANTM prize package. She also has been on the cover of Forest & Bluff Magazine, January 2009 issue and Nylon Magazine, March 2009. She has recently been featured on Yahoo Style with Whitney Thompson. She had the cover and a spread in Chicago Scene, June 2009 as well as various advertisements for Forever 21, Rendezvous, Myer, Crabtree and Evelyn and Sass and Bide. She also appeared on the September 2009 issue of Marie Claire modelling Oroton, Fendi and Miu Miu handbags and purses. Sullivan was featured on the Cover Fall 2009 cover and interior fashion spread of Vogue Knitting magazine.

=== Runway ===
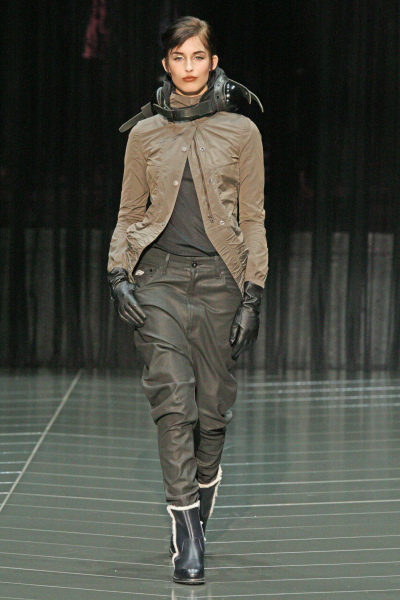

She has walked for EиD by Eva and Delia, Mada van Gaans, Ready to Fish by Ilja Visser and Addy van den Krommenacker at Amsterdam International Fashion Week 2009, bookings she was hired for during the go-sees of episode 10. Sullivan also walked for G-Star at Mercedes-Benz Fashion Week Fall 2009. She has walked in Trinidad and Tobago Fashion Week 2009 for Heather Jones Designs Limited. She also appeared in Dutch Avantgarde with Samantha Potter. She also appeared on the runway for Mr. Jay's clothing line called "attitude" with Aminat.

== Personal life ==
In 2005, Sullivan met her husband, Sam Alvey, a mixed martial artist, at the Bristol Renaissance Faire where he was working. On August 7, 2011, after four years of dating, Alvey proposed to Sullivan. They married January 19, 2013 at the Wilderness Hotel in Wisconsin Dells. The couple have five children together.

== Awards and honors ==
During her My Life as a CoverGirl commercials, it was revealed that she had been working with the Make-A-Wish Foundation. She was also named one of People magazine's Most Beautiful People of 2009.

She was also named the 44th sexiest woman of 2008 by BuddyTv.

Preceded by Whitney Thompson	America's Next Top Model winner Cycle 11 (2008)	Succeeded by Teyona Anderson
