= Nicole Fox =

American-French model and actress

- Born: Nicole Arianna Fox; March 6, 1991 (age 35); Louisville, Colorado, US
- Spouse: Jacob Abuhamada
- Children: 1
- Modeling information
- Height: 5 ft 7 in (1.70 m)
- Hair color: Red
- Eye color: Green
- Agency: Wilhelmina Models

Nicole Arianna Abuhamada (née Fox, born March 6, 1991) is an American model, artist, and former actress, best known as the winner of Cycle 13 of America's Next Top Model.

== Biography ==
Fox graduated from Monarch High School. As of 2009, she was a sophomore student at University of Colorado at Boulder majoring in studio arts. She wanted to be an artist, journalist and model.

=== America's Next Top Model ===
Fox was the eleventh contestant selected as one of the 14 contestants to compete in Tyra's Le Cycle 13, the "Petite Edition" of America's Next Top Model, a cycle that was specially created for models who are 5'7" and under. Fox stood at 5'7", the maximum height for the entry. A couple of months before Fox tried out for the show, she met a photographer at an art gallery in Denver. He encouraged her to try out for the show because he knew Allison Harvard the runner up in both Cycles 12 and 17 (the "All Stars Edition") was also an artist like Fox. With his encouragement, she tried out for Tyra's Le Cycle 13.

Throughout the competition, Fox won two reward challenges and received three first call-outs. She never placed below fifth (just like Cycle 11 winner McKey Sullivan) and was one of the strongest contestants of her cycle. At the final judging, Fox was lauded for her high-fashion photographs and her successful mastery of her body proportion, in spite of her unconventional runway walk in the Maui fashion show. In the end, she was chosen as the thirteenth winner of America's Next Top Model, beating runner-up Laura Kirkpatrick, who was considered another favorite of the judges. Fox became the third winner to have never appeared in the bottom two during her time on Top Model. This record was preceded by winners Jaslene Gonzalez and McKey Sullivan from Cycles 8 and 11 respectively, and was succeeded by Krista White, Sophie Sumner, Jourdan Miller and India Gants from Cycles 14, 18 the "British Invasion", 20 "Guys & Girls" and 23 respectively. Fox also became the first America's Next Top Model winner to have also never even appeared in the bottom three. This was succeeded by Cycle 20 winner Jourdan Miller.

Kirkpatrick said she believed Fox won because of the strength of her photos: "Every time with the judges, she could do no wrong in front of them. They really saw her as perfect."

Fox said of her win:

Sometimes I didn't think I was going to survive the journey, like I remember during casting week I went home and I cried because I was like "What have I got myself into? I can't deal with this!" And I didn't think it would be okay to be that dorky girl but I'm a dork and I'm America's Next Top Model!

Fox received a $100,000 contract with CoverGirl cosmetics, a representation contract with Wilhelmina Models and was featured on the cover of Seventeen, as well as a six-page spread in the magazine. Tyra Banks, retired supermodel and host of America's Next Top Model, said to Fox following her win, "You are a star. You have IT!" Her sister, Alexandra Fox, said of her sister: "She's definitely glad she did it, but she wouldn't repeat it. You're on camera 24 hours a day, and you can't have a single conversation without worrying about how it will be edited."

==== Print work ====
Fox received a six-page spread in Seventeen magazine as the winner of "America's Next Top Model" and an ad for Cover Girl Lash Blast Mascara. Fox has also modeled for Illiterate Magazine, in which she had a spread, and been featured on AOL.com, More Magazine and in OK! Magazine. Fox was featured in Wild Fox Couture's 2010 fall collection lookbook along with models Rachel Ballinger and Daria Plyushko. Fox also appeared in online ads for Spirit Hoods and in a campaign for Heritage 1981's Spring 2010 collection—which is a sister brand of Forever 21, and ads for Steve Madden Spring Collection. She will be in the campaign for Nicole Richie's "House of Harlow 1960 Spring 2011" fashion line. In January 2010, a news story circulated reporting that Fox would be the face of Alexander McQueen's new spring/summer collection, but this rumor was revealed to be false and has been debunked by both McQueen and Fox.

==== Acting ====
Fox starred as Ashley in the indie teen drama Ashley, directed by Dean Ronalds and produced by Trick Candle Productions and Ronalds Brothers Productions. The film was released in the US in 2013. Fox portrayed a model on the television soap opera The Bold and the Beautiful in December 2011. Fox can also be spotted in the Avengers Dr. Pepper commercial (2012) as Stan Lee's assistant.

In 2012, Fox was chosen by director Brett Leonard for the PopFictionLife FragFilm The Other Country, starring Christian country band Burlap to Cashmere. Fox plays Melanie, a concert-goer who catches the eye of Burlap's lead guitarist, Johnny.

In 2014, Fox starred in Redlands which was favorably reviewed in The Washington Post as "artfully evocative — of alienation, the constraints on ambition and the danger of unexpressed anger." Her performance as an aspiring model in Redlands was lauded in El Mundo as "a diamond in the rough: she knows how to communicate her emotions through her eyes, she has a suggestive voice, an impressive physique, and she isn’t afraid of taking risks."

In 2014, Fox starred in Girl House as Mia, a beautiful young model who lives in a house that streams content to an X-rated website.

== Filmography ==
Film and televisions
Year	Title	Role	Notes
2009–2010	America’s Next Top Model	Herself	Contestant cycle 13; guest cycle 14
2011	Almighty Thor	Redhead Norn	TV film
2011-12	The Bold and the Beautiful	Forrester Model	Recurring role
2012	The Unwritten Rules	Miranda	"Merry Christmas"
2012	The Other Country: Starring Burlap to Cashmere	Melanie	
2013	Players	Stephanie	Video short
2013	Ashley	Ashley Collins	
2014	Redlands	Vienna	
2014	The Last Survivors	Brooke	
2014	Girl House	Mia	
2015	Tag	Prissy Girl	
2015	Hero of the Underworld	Holly	
2015	Ideal	Model	Short film
2016	Paradise Club	Tulsa	
2016	Ouroboros	Hannah	Short film, post-production
2016	Neron	Morgan	
2017	Circus Kane	Carrie	

Preceded by Teyona Anderson	America's Next Top Model winner Cycle 13 (2009)	Succeeded by Krista White
