= America's Next Top Model season 21 =

America's Next Top Model
- Season 21
- Judges: Tyra Banks; Kelly Cutrone; J. Alexander
- No. of contestants: 14
- Winner: Keith Carlos
- No. of episodes: 16

Release
- Original network: The CW
- Original release: August 18 – December 5, 2014

Additional information
- Filming dates: February 26 – April 12, 2014

Season chronology
- ← Previous; Season 20 Next → Season 22

The 21st cycle of America's Next Top Model (subtitled as America's Next Top Model: Guys & Girls) premiered on August 18, 2014, and it is the 15th season to air on The CW. It was the second season to feature female contestants and male contestants. Tyra Banks and Kelly Cutrone retained their positions on the judging panel. Runway coach J. Alexander returned to the judging panel, replacing former judge Rob Evans while Johnny Wujek, creative director since Cycle 19, was succeeded by photographer Yu Tsai. In keeping with the last two cycles, social media was a factor in eliminations, with public voting taking place on the show's official page. The fourteen finalists were revealed when voting began.

The international destination for this cycle was Seoul, South Korea. This also marks the final ever international destination for the show. Five of the episodes were filmed in Seoul, one of which featured James of Royal Pirates, and the finale had guest appearances from K-pop girl group 2NE1, boy band BTOB, actor and model Lee Soo-hyuk and fashion designer Lie Sang Bong.

The winner of the competition was 26-year-old Keith Carlos from Bridgeport, Connecticut. He was the show's first male winner. Will Jardell placed as the runner up, and later appeared with his boyfriend, James Wallington, on The Amazing Race 32, where they go on to win.

Eighth eliminated contestant Mirjana Puhar was shot and killed on February 24, 2015, in her boyfriend's home in Charlotte, North Carolina.

== Prizes ==
Returning prizes include: a modeling contract with NEXT Model Management, a spread in Nylon magazine, and a US$100,000 campaign with Guess

== Contestants ==
(Ages stated are at start of contest)

Contestant	Age	Height	Hometown	Finish	Place
Ivy Timlin	20	5 ft 8 in (1.73 m)	Buffalo, New York	Episode 3	14
Romeo Tostado	23	6 ft 0.5 in (1.84 m)	Salinas, California	Episode 5	13 (DQ)
Benjamin 'Ben' Schreen	24	6 ft 3 in (1.91 m)	Waverly, Iowa	Episode 6	12
Kari Calhoun	23	5 ft 8.5 in (1.74 m)	Coppell, Texas	Episode 7	11
Matthew Smith	24	6 ft 4 in (1.93 m)	Highlands Ranch, Colorado	Episode 8	10
Denzel Wells	23	5 ft 10.25 in (1.78 m)	Houston, Texas	Episode 9	9
Mirjana Puhar †	18	5 ft 8.5 in (1.74 m)	Charlotte, North Carolina	Episode 10	8
Raelia Lewis	22	6 ft 0.5 in (1.84 m)	Philadelphia, Pennsylvania	Episode 12	7
Chantelle Young	19	5 ft 9 in (1.75 m)	Toronto, Canada	Episode 13	6
Andrea 'Shei' Phan	23	5 ft 10 in (1.78 m)	Ardmore, Oklahoma	Episode 14	5
Lenox Tillman	19	5 ft 9.5 in (1.77 m)	Newnan, Georgia	Episode 16	4
Adam Smith	26	5 ft 11 in (1.80 m)	Memphis, Tennessee	Episode 16	3
William 'Will' Jardell	23	6 ft 6 in (1.98 m)	Nederland, Texas	Episode 16	2
Keith Carlos	26	6 ft 2 in (1.88 m)	Bridgeport, Connecticut	Episode 16	1

== Episodes ==
No. overall	No. in season	Title	Original release date	US viewers (millions)
254	1	"The Boyz R Back"	August 18, 2014	1.18
The season begins with thirty-one hopeful contestants being flown to Los Angeles for an inaugural EDM themed runway show. Cycle 20 contestant Cory Hindorff and Tyra Banks reveal that runway coach J. Alexander is back on the judging panel. Immediately afterwards, the contestants square off in pairs on the runway. Their assignment is to take selfies on the runway for people on social media to see. After the runway show, each contestant is interviewed by the judges before the first cut is made. One of the models, Jamie Rae, arrives several hours after the runway show has concluded. The following day, all of them are taken to a bowling alley for elimination. Each bootcamp contestant is asked to bowl in order to reveal what is on the score screen. Those who will continue for the second week of casting are greeted with a mark of approval on the screen. Those who have been eliminated are met with a rejection notice. At the conclusion of the episode, the contestants are reminded that only fourteen contestants will make the final cast and move into the top model home.: Special guests: Cory Hindorff
255	2	"The Guy Who Gets a Second Chance"	August 25, 2014	0.97
The contestants take part in a competition themed subway challenge at Los Angeles Metro's Red Line, overseen by photographer Franco Lacosta. The goal is to put together a season-themed outfit (spring, summer, fall, winter) in each station, and hurry into the train before the doors close. Several contestants fail to board the train on time each round. Ultimately only two contestants, Danny and Matthew, remain by the fourth station. Franco declares Matthew as the winner of the challenge. The following day, the contestants are taken to a beach. There, they are greeted by Kelly Cutrone and Yu Tsai. Kelly reveals that Yu Tsai will be the new creative director of the show. A few moments after, the models are whisked away for a photo shoot in the beach. Each contestant poses alone before gathering together for a massive group shot. After the photo shoot is over, Tyra and the judges deliberate and select the final fourteen. Unlike previous years, the contestants are not called forward individually for the final round of casting. Instead, they are called in pairs. Tyra reveals that from each pair, one contestant will be admitted, and the other will be asked to wait. The process is repeated until all the spots are filled. During one of the rounds Tyra accepts both Adam and Denzel, filling all the spots and eliminating the remaining eight contestants. Immediately afterwards, she announces that the top fourteen will part take in a fashion show wearing nothing but silly string as the episode continued in cliffhanger.: Featured photographers: Franco Lacosta, Yu Tsai
256	3	"The Girl Who's a Player"	September 1, 2014	1.23
Concluded from the previous episode, the silly string fashion turned out as the contestants' first challenge. Miss J critiques everyone's walks before the challenge. Before the show starts the models are introduced to the director of NEXT models, Alexis Borges. Alexis Borges will determine the winner of the runway show challenge. Will is nervous about the challenge due to his insecurities about his body, while Adam is overconfident. Keith won the challenge and has chosen to a Tyra Suite with any of his contestant until the elimination later in the panel. The next day, the contestants meet with Tyra and Yu Tsai for their first photo shoot, where they will be splashed with buckets of water. It is explained that the shoot will consist of two parts: the first is filming for the season's opening titles, and the second is taking still photos that will be used for scoring. After Tyra films her parts, the contestants take their turns. Will ultimately struggles with his insecurities about his body once again, while Mirjana is chastised for looking too sexy. Raelia has flashbacks of her almost drowning in the past, and Ivy has trouble coping with the cold temperatures of the water. Keith, Romeo, Kari, and Lenox receive praise during their session. At the panel, Mirjana and Lenox receive positive feedback, while some of the other contestants receive mixed feedback. Shei, Ivy and Raelia are given negative feedback. Denzel is told that his body might be too muscular for fashion. Adam receives positive feedback, but is again reprimanded for not taking the competition seriously. Will produces a great photo, despite struggling at the shoot. Keith receives first call out, and receives keys to the Tyra Suite again. Ivy and Will are given the worst scores for their photographs, and land in the bottom two together during elimination. Will was managed to save despite having a second lowest score, Ivy was eliminated.
257	4	"The Guy Who Gets a Beard Weave"	September 8, 2014	0.99
The contestants are taken to Pershing Square to meet with Yu Tsai and photographer An Le. The concept of the photo shoot is to create photographs depicting a twofold optical illusion by laying flat on the ground. Keith, Lenox, Ben, Raelia, Shei and Will do well during their session. Adam and Kari struggle to impress. Chantelle is called out on her over confidence, which is verging on arrogance. Most of the contestants struggle to hold their weight to create a pose, most notably Romeo and Denzel, who winds up cursing and storming off set after he is yelled at by Yu Tsai for being unable to hold up a bicycle. Back at the house, the contestants find a box containing instructions for a scavenger hunt to find boxes each containing a specific make over. One of the boxes also includes a pair of 'magic shears'. The contestant who finds the shears is allowed to know exactly what their make over will be. Denzel ultimately finds the shears, and is told that he will be getting a lace front beard weave. Chantelle becomes agitated when she realizes that one of the boxes contains instructions for shaved hair, believing that that will be her make over. That discussion lead into an eventual makeovers at Cristophe salon, Tyra brings Cory to the salon to encourage the models to accept whatever 'Ty-over' they are given. At judging, Tyra reminds the models that since there is no challenge score for the week, their fan vote will be the only determining factor as to who gets eliminated once it's added to the judges scores. Lenox, Will, and Raelia and are given good reviews for their photographs. Ben receives the best feedback, and consequently earns best photo. Adam, Shei, Kari and Chantelle receive the heaviest criticism. Chantelle and Kari find themselves in the bottom two. Chantelle is critiqued on not putting her beauty to good use in photographs, while Kari is reprimanded for her lack of neck in photos, and her inability to embrace her make over. In the end, Chantelle was eliminated.: Featured photographer: An Le; Special guests: Cristophe, Cory Hindorff
258	5	"The Guy Who Starts a Fight"	September 15, 2014	1.00
Tyra teaches the contestants about being sexy for a commercial before they asked to practice what they have learned. Raelia, Keith, and Will shine during the practice run, while Adam struggles to find the correct movement. Tyra evidently becomes irritated after Lenox gives up in the middle of her practice session. The next Morning, Yu Tsai wakes up the models and reveals that they will be doing a commercial in pairs for a fragrance, Spyder Byte with the women embodying black widow spiders and the men posing as their victims. At the shoot, Will, Matthew, Keith, Mirjana, Romeo, and Raelia excel. Denzel and Kari struggle at finding chemistry with each other, due to Denzel becoming distracted by Mirjana, who is giving all her attention to Keith. Lenox struggles to embody the sexual character, while Adam struggles with movement once again. Later that night, the contestants celebrated Romeo's birthday as most of the contestants are surprise at how personable Romeo is being with everyone. Romeo became drunk and staggers into Tyra Suite with Adam. They playfully exchange words before Romeo suddenly becomes combative towards Adam. The two exchange threats, with Romeo goading Adam to hit him and Adam trying to get Romeo back to his room. It eventually ends with Romeo headbutting Adam on the side of the face before he is restrained by Will and guided back to his room. The following day, Romeo is still berating Adam, while Adam refuses to argue with him. This lead into his eventual disqualification when Miss J asked to leave him immediately just before the start of the challenge for the other contestants. The challenge was a runway challenge, Mirjana struggles backstage during practice, but excels on the runway. Raelia falls before making her entrance. Ben, Will and Mirjana are praised for their performances. Ben is ultimately declared as the challenge winner. At panel, Adam is commended for taking the high road in the confrontation between him and Romeo. He is also congratulated on his improvement during the week, but is chastised for his walk. Shei, Kari, Denzel and Lenox all receive negative feedback. Will and Raelia both receive a high level of praise. In a top model first, Lenox becomes the first contestant to receive a 1 from Tyra for not having taken the commercial seriously and neglecting the time she was given to practice what she had been taught. Adam and Lenox are revealed to be the bottom two. After the final scores roll, Lenox is eliminated from the competition. Immediately after reprimanding Lenox, Tyra reveals that due to Romeo's disqualification, Lenox will be allowed to stay. As a punishment for having had the lowest score, she is given only five frames for the following shoot.: Featured director: Franco Lacosta
259	6	"The Girl Who Got Five Frames"	September 22, 2014	1.17
The contestants arrive at a studio where Yu Tsai announces that they will be doing a slow motion hair whipping shoot. He introduces Massimo Campana, the photographer for the shoot. Massimo reminds the models that every frame counts, especially Lenox who only has five frames as a result of having been called last at panel for the last elimination. On set, Adam, Shei, Mirjana, Denzel, Will, Raelia, and Kari excel and impress Yu Tsai and Massimo. Lenox struggles and breaks down, but soon collects herself after having a talk with Yu. The contestants notice that Denzel and Mirjana's relationship contrasts with Kari and Keith's relationship, as the latter two keep their professional on set. Yu Tsai critiques Keith's lack of facial expressions. The day after the shoot Yu Tsai, joined by cycle 20 contestant Nina Burns, tell the contestants that they will be having a party in honor of a special guest. Nina introduces Nick Cannon, who tells the models that they will be put to the test by making a panoramic ad campaign for his new line of headphones. Due to having been the bottom three at panel the previous week, Adam, Ben and Lenox are chosen as team captains. Lenox and her team, consisting of Matthew and Kari, ultimately win the challenge. At panel, Lenox, Mirjana, Shei, Will, Raelia and Adam receive good feedback. The rest, with the exception of Ben, Kari, and Keith, receive mixed feedback. Lenox redeems herself and receives best photo. Keith and Ben shockingly end up in the bottom two, both having received best photo in the previous weeks. Keith manages to stay, eliminating Ben from the competition.: Featured photographer: Massimo Campana; Special guests: Nina Burns, Nick Cannon
260	7	"The Guy Who Wears Heels"	October 3, 2014	1.12
The contestants ' challenge was headed to The CW Studios in Burbank, Kelly introduces them to Lori Openden, the head of talent and casting of The CW. Lori announces that the contestants will be auditioning for her and an array of other executives for a role in one of The CW shows. They are all asked to choose a partner. Mirjana picks Keith instead of Denzel, remembering that their chemistry in the Spider Byte commercial was spectacular. While rehearsing their lines, Mirjana becomes distracted when Denzel and Shei begin to practice the kissing scene. After the auditions, Denzel, Adam and Lenox receive praise. Denzel is declared the winner, which shocks Mirjana. Back at the house, Mirjana is angry when she sees her name and Keith's at the bottom of the score board with a score of five. Mirjana and Denzel later get into an argument due to Mirjana's jealousy towards Shei. While having a conversation with Keith, Denzel mentions that while he wants a guy to win the competition, he doesn't want it to be Will. He goes on to explain that he feels Will is not an "alpha male" due to his choice of wearing high heeled shoes. Will, who listens to their conversation, becomes upset and tells Raelia about what he heard. Raelia confronts Denzel and tells him that Will heard the entire conversation and is upset. The rest of the contestants comfort Will. The contestants are later taken to an arctic themed photo shoot at a local ice rink. The friction between Denzel and Will is still the talk of the day. Many of the contestants manage to do well. Kari however struggles to pull off a great shot, despite having an edgy look well suited for the theme. Tension arises at the photo shoot when Raelia overhears Mirjana talking about her as she poses. A confrontation later ensues on the bus ride home between the two. At panel, before judging starts, Tyra instigates a conversation between Denzel and Will on the subject of Denzel's previous comments. Denzel apologizes and Tyra gives him a strong warning about the fashion industry and what is entailed in it. Lenox, Adam, Will, Keith get good critique, whilst Shei, Raelia and Kari receive negative reviews for their performances this week. Raelia is noted for being good when moving, such as in the commercial two weeks prior, and Shei is criticized for being just "pretty". Raelia and Kari are in the bottom two, Kari was eliminated and a Raelia was saved from elimination.: Featured photographer: Franco Lacosta; Special guests: Lori Openden, Kristen Vadas
261	8	"The Girl Who Says it's Over"	October 10, 2014	1.04
The contestants meet with Kelly and Marvin Scott Jarett, the founder of Nylon magazine. For their challenge, the contestants are split into three groups of three with Keith, Matthew and Mirjana as the team leaders. They are each assigned a special theme from Kelly's fashion line, Electric Love Army and given thirty minutes to take photos of the clothing while selling their theme. The winner of the challenge will be featured on Nylon TV with Kelly. Mirjana's team struggles due to the flirting between Mirjana and Denzel which causes them to be told off by Kelly for not following basic instructions. Matthew's team initially struggles, but manage to produce a good shot. Kelly reprimands Matthew over his use of inappropriate language during the task. Keith's team proves victorious and wins the challenge. Upon returning home, the contestants view their challenge scores. Mirjana, Lenox and Denzel all receive a six, which annoys Lenox, as she feels Mirjana and Denzel are to blame for the low scores. For the photo shoot, the contestants receive the results from the DNA samples taken before makeovers some weeks before. Tyra introduces them to Ken Chahine, and they begin to reveal common ancestry bonds between the contestants. Raelia, Mirjana and Lenox all share a common heritage of Asian, while Adam and Shei share an ancestry of Irish descent. Keith and Matthew share a heritage of Spanish descent, while Denzel and Will share three common bonds of Finnish, Scandinavian and European Jewish heritage, much to their surprise. The contestants are then informed that they will use their bind heritages in a photo shoot relating to the future of science while posing with cycle twenty contestant, Cory Hindorff. Lenox and Will perform well during their sessions, while Matthew and Denzel struggle. Adam, Mirjana, Keith and Shei receive mixed comments from the photographer. Later on in the house Mirjana and Denzel rekindle their relationship, much to the disappointment of the other contestants. At panel, Lenox and Will are praised for their photographs leading to Lenox receiving full marks on her photo. Matthew and Shei are criticized, while Mirjana is chastised for her low challenge score. The other contestants receive mildly positive feedback overall. Lenox received another first call-out, while Matthew and Mirjana are in the bottom two. Matthew, for his limited number of facial expressions and coasting in the middle, and Mirjana for her low challenge score and inability to be a strong team leader during the challenge despite a stellar photo. The scores begin to roll and Mirjana is saved, eliminating Matthew from the competition. After Matthew's elimination, Tyra finds out her DNA results from ancestry DNA to realize that she is 79% African American, 6% Native American and 14% British.: Featured photographer: Erik Asla; Special guests: Marvin Scott Jarett, Cory Hindorff, Ken Chahine
262	9	"The Guy Who Wows Betsey Johnson"	October 17, 2014	1.06
Miss J drops by the house for a sleepover with Lenox, Raelia and Shei. Will expresses annoyance over the fact that Lenox received best photo instead of him. The three female contestants receive a brief runway and dancing lesson from Miss J Much like during the teach with Tyra some weeks before, Lenox is hesitant to let herself go. Before leaving, Miss J announces that the contestants will attend castings for Style Fashion Week the next day. The contestants are greeted again by Miss J and NEXT director Alexis Borges at L.A. Live for Style fashion week. They reveal that they will be attending castings for Betsey Johnson, Control sector, Altaf Maaneshia for the girls, and Civil society for the male contestants. Shei books the most shows at three. Keith, Raelia and Will book two. Adam, Lenox and Mirjana book one, while Denzel books none. During the show, Shei impresses Miss J and Alexis the most. Will is commended on his improved runway walk. Raelia is chastised for having stopped halfway down the catwalk during one of the shows, while Lenox receives criticism on her bored facial expression. Shei is revealed to be the challenge winner. Back at home, she receives clothing from the designers of the show. For the photo shoot, the contestants are asked to pose in pairs for a Mitch Stone Essentials ad campaign. The pair who gets best photo at panel will have their photo featured on Mitch Stone's website. At panel, Will and Raelia receive the highest scores. Denzel is critiqued on his overly muscled body, which prevented him from booking any shows. Adam, Keith, Mirjana and Shei receive mild to positive feedback. Lenox is critiqued on her inability to let loose. During elimination Will receives best picture. Raelia follows, meaning that their photo will be featured in Mitch Stone's website. Denzel and Lenox land together in the bottom two. Lenox receives the last photo hanging on by a margin of 0.1, sending Denzel home. Immediately after Denzel's elimination, Tyra brings a buffet of Soul food explaining that the party is too small, and needs more people. The eliminated contestants proceed to step into the room. Tyra reveals that the models will be traveling to Seoul, South Korea for the remainder of the competition. Chantelle and Ben are revealed to have obtained the highest social media averages out of the eliminated female contestants and male contestants. Before they get a chance to rejoin the other seven contestants, Tyra announces that there is only one seat on the plane for one of them, and that only one contestant will be brought back. (Note: The final scores were revealed the following episode as being 6.68 for Chantelle and 6.44 for Ben.) The final scores begin to roll, and the episode ends in a cliffhanger.: Featured photographer: Erik Asla; Special guests: Alexis Borges, Betsey Johnson, Maxwell Amadeus, Altaf Maaneshia, Kiara Belen, Mitch Stone
263	10	"The Girl with the Bloodcurling Scream"	October 24, 2014	1.08
Concluded from the previous episode, Tyra announces that Chantelle has achieved the highest average fan score of 6.68, earning to return from the competition and outlasted Ben by 0.24 point margin. Shortly afterwards, she tells the contestants that there will be final elimination in Los Angeles before they will travel to Seoul. Back at home, the contestants become annoyed by Chantelle's comment that she was 'enjoying it more on the other side'. Meanwhile, Mirjana struggles at coping with Denzel's elimination. For the challenge, the contestants are taken to an abandoned slaughter house, where they are introduced to photographer Mark Hunter. They explain that the goal of the challenge is to remain composed for a shoot in the dark while actors in the slaughterhouse attempt to scare them. Will and Adam retain their composure best, while Raelia is the most shaken by the experience. Chantelle and Shei receive the most positive feedback, but it is Chantelle who is chosen as the challenge winner. Along with Lenox and Will, Raelia receives one of the lowest scores at 6. She becomes extremely emotional about the possibility of being eliminated. For having won best picture the previous week, Will is given the chance to see his parents for the day. Later in the afternoon Miss J and Yu Tsai drop by the house to explain the theme of the upcoming photo shoot, a public awareness campaign which will be based on the saying 'no glove, no love', which has to do with wearing contraceptives to prevent the spread of HIV and AIDS. During the shoot Chantelle initially struggles, but manages to impress near the end. Lenox and Adam both exceed, while Shei is commended for her creative initiative during her session as well as her outstanding performance. Will, Raelia, Keith and Mirjana all struggle to varying degrees. At the judging panel, Chantelle, Lenox, Shei and Adam all receive positive feedback. Kelly calls out Chantelle on her lack of sincerity, with the latter replying that she is used to putting up a wall due to her vitiligo. Will is criticized for his flabby body, while Raelia and Mirjana are critiqued on their lack of energy. Chantelle receives best photo, while Mirjana and Raelia consequently land in the bottom two. Mirjana was eliminated and the remaining contestants are preparing to travel to South Korea.: Featured photographer: Erik Asla; Special guests: Mark "The Cobra Snake" Hunter
264	11	"What Happens on ANTM Stays on ANTM"	October 31, 2014	0.80
The episode consists of clips with behind the scenes footage, including never before seen clips like the semi-finalists' imitation of the judges, Romeo's war freak moments, Adam's crazy advice (including his flirty moment with Shei), as well as the continuation of the truth or dare game where Keith is dared to kiss Denzel. The episode also reviews Shei's dancing abilities, Mirjana talk with Denzel about her doubt in his feelings for her, as well as the other models talking about how to take Mirjana out of her infatuation to Denzel. Other footage includes Shei and Will's imitation of Adam, Matthew and his alien stories, along with Ms. J's extended visit to the models where he makes fun of Romeo and the pentagram he had left behind. Cycle 20 winner Jourdan Miller makes an appearance at Style Fashion Week, where she shares Denzel's experience of not having booked any shows her season. The remaining clips show Mirjana apologizing to Will after the argument they'd had in the Mitch Stone photo shoot.: Special guests: Jourdan Miller
265	12	"The Guy Who Parties Too Hard"	November 7, 2014	1.08
As the top seven contestants arrived in South Korea, the contestants are driven to an open market before meeting up with Yu Tsai, who introduces them to the members of K-pop band BtoB. The goal of their challenge is to dance to one of their songs in front of a crowd before getting their photos taken. The contestant with the best dance moves and photos wins the challenge. The contestants receive a lesson on moves from the band members, and are split into two separate groups for the dance. Chantelle, Lenox, Raelia and Will are up first. Chantelle, Raelia and Will all do well. Lenox struggles most with the dance. Adam Keith and Shei are up afterwards. Shei does fine, while Adam maintains the same face throughout. Keith is complimented on being natural and sexy. After the dance is over, the top three contenders are revealed to be Chantelle, Keith and Raelia. For mixing the dance and modeling elements of the challenge best, Raelia is declared as the winner. The models are then taken to their new suite at the W Seoul Walkerhill Hotel. Raelia is exited for her high challenge score, while Adam is angry when he sees his score of seven. He proceeds to drink the rest of the night, and continues to do so into the morning. For the photo shoot, the contestants must pose with MCM bags at Seoul City Hall. Tyra arrives on set to do hair and make-up. Adam struggles with his facial expression and movement during his session. Will impresses on set, and takes the fewest frames to get his final shot. Raelia comes under fire for her overt sexual appeal. Michael Michalsky, the artistic director of MCM, states that her look is not right to represent the brand. Like Adam, Keith initially struggles. After getting direction from Yu and Tyra, he is able to impress. At panel, Lenox, Will and Keith all receive the highest scores. Shei and Adam, in spite of his poor performance during the shoot, are praised as well. Raelia is critiqued on the poor results of her photo shoot, while Chantelle is called out for letting her attitude and control get in the way of her photos. She is also confronted for changing her hair and make up repeatedly. Chantelle and Raelia are in the bottom two, Chantelle having both totaled a 29 from the challenge and the judges, her fan vote of 6.8 manages to beat Raelia's by a margin of 0.4 allowing her to remain in the competition over Raelia, who is eliminated.: Featured photographer: Erik Asla; Special guests: BtoB, Michael Michalsky
266	13	"The Girl Who Gets Caught on a Lie"	November 14, 2014	1.19
Featured photographer: Erik Asla; Special guests: BtoB, Ben Baller, Jay Park, Jinny Kim, James Ju-hyun Lee, The Studio K, Mag & Logan, Sun-jung Lee
267	14	"The Guy with Moves Like Elvis"	November 21, 2014	1.16
Featured photographer: Massimo Campana; Special guests: Yoon Jong-hoon, Clara
268	15	"Finale Part One: The Last Girl Standing"	December 5, 2014	1.16
Featured photographer: Yu Tsai; Special guests: Allison Harvard
269	16	"Finale Part Two: America's Next Top Model is..."	December 5, 2014	1.16
Special guests: Jourdan Miller, 2NE1

== Summaries ==
=== Call-out order ===
Order	Episodes												
Order	3	4	5 (Note: In episode 5, Romeo was disqualified from the competition after getting involved in a physical altercation with Adam. Later on, Lenox was originally eliminated when she landed in the bottom two, but was allowed to stay due to Romeo's disqualification.)	6	7	8	9 (Note: After Denzel's elimination in episode 9, the eliminated contestants, including Denzel, were brought back into the judging room. Chantelle and Ben were revealed to have the highest female and male social media scores. Tyra announced that only one of them would be allowed to return. The episode ended in a cliffhanger before the final scores were revealed. The comeback segment resumed in the beginning of episode 10, where it was revealed that Chantelle had achieved the highest public vote average out of the eliminated contestants, allowing her to return to the competition.)	10	12	13	14	15 (Note: The finale was divided into two separate episodes that aired back to back. In episode 15, the contestants took part in the final two shoots before a final elimination preceding the final runway show. Lenox and Keith landed in the bottom two. The episode ended in a cliffhanger, with Lenox's elimination being shown at the beginning of episode 16. In episode 16, the final three walked in the final show with all the eliminated contestants before the final judging.)	16
1	Keith	Ben	Will	Lenox	Lenox	Lenox	Will	Chantelle	Keith	Keith	Adam	Adam	Keith
2	Lenox	Lenox	Raelia	Mirjana	Adam	Will	Raelia	Shei	Will	Lenox	Keith	Will	Will
3	Mirjana	Will	Keith	Raelia	Will	Shei	Keith	Lenox	Lenox	Will	Will	Keith	Adam
4	Matthew	Raelia	Mirjana	Shei	Denzel	Keith	Shei	Adam	Shei	Shei	Lenox	Lenox	
5	Denzel	Keith	Matthew	Will	Matthew	Adam	Mirjana	Keith	Adam	Adam	Shei		
6	Chantelle	Matthew	Shei	Adam	Mirjana	Denzel	Adam	Will	Chantelle	Chantelle			
7	Ben	Mirjana	Denzel	Matthew	Keith	Raelia	Lenox	Raelia	Raelia				
8	Romeo	Romeo	Kari	Denzel	Shei	Mirjana	Denzel	Mirjana					
9	Kari	Denzel	Ben	Kari	Raelia	Matthew							
10	Adam	Shei	Adam	Keith	Kari								
11	Raelia	Adam	Lenox	Ben									
12	Shei	Kari	Romeo										
13	Will	Chantelle											
14	Ivy												

The contestant returned to the competition
The contestant was eliminated
The contestant was disqualified from the competition
The contestant was originally eliminated but was saved
The contestant won the competition

=== Bottom two ===
Episode	Contestants	Eliminated
3	Ivy & Will	Ivy
4	Chantelle & Kari	Chantelle
5	Adam & Lenox	Romeo
5	Adam & Lenox	Lenox
6	Ben & Keith	Ben
7	Kari & Raelia	Kari
8	Matthew & Mirjana	Matthew
9	Denzel & Lenox	Denzel
10	Mirjana & Raelia	Mirjana
12	Chantelle & Raelia	Raelia
13	Adam & Chantelle	Chantelle
14	Lenox & Shei	Shei
15	Keith & Lenox	Lenox
16	Adam, Keith & Will	Adam
16	Keith & Will	Will

The contestant was eliminated after their first time in the bottom two
The contestant was eliminated after their second time in the bottom two
The contestant was eliminated after their third time in the bottom two
The contestant was eliminated after her fourth time in the bottom two
The contestant was disqualified from the competition
The contestant was originally eliminated but was saved.
The contestant was eliminated in the final judging and placed third
The contestant was eliminated in the final judging and placed as the runner-up

=== Average call-out order ===
Casting call-out order, comeback first call-out and final three are not included.

Rank by average	Place	Model	Call-out total	Number of call-outs	Call-out average
1	4	Lenox	41	12	3.42
2	2	Will	44	12	3.67
3	1	Keith	45	12	3.75
4	8	Mirjana	43	8	5.37
5	3	Adam	66	12	5.50
6	5	Shei	62	11	5.64
7	7	Raelia	52	9	5.78
8	10	Matthew	36	6	6.00
9	6	Chantelle	32	5	6.40
10	9	Denzel	47	7	6.71
11	12	Ben	28	4	7.00
12	13	Romeo	16	2	8.00
13	11	Kari	48	5	9.60
14	14	Ivy	14	1	14.00

=== Scoring chart ===
Place	Model	Episodes													Total score	Average
Place	Model	3	4	5	6	7	8	9	10	12	13	14	16	16	Total score	Average
1	Keith	41.8	30.8	39.3	36.9	32.6	37.9	41.3	35.3	46.4	44.4	39.2	34.0	51.70	511.6	39.4
2	Will	33.1	31.8	40.9	38.8	36.4	42.1	44.1	35.0	45.8	39.8	37.8	35.0	49.20	509.8	39.2
3	Adam	34.7	26.8	33.0	38.5	37.4	37.7	35.6	37.7	36.2	37.0	41.8	38.0	45.16	479.6	36.9
4	Lenox	39.6	33.6	30.3 (Note: As a result of Romeo's disqualification, Lenox was allowed to remain in the competition despite having the lowest score at panel.)	44.7	45.2	43.9	35.5	38.6	39.7	42.0	37.2	31.0		461.3	38.4
5	Shei	33.6	27.3	37.3	39.0	32.5	38.1	39.6	40.5	37.9	38.5	36.6			400.9	36.4
6	Chantelle	37.1	26.3						42.2 (Note: Chantelle returned to the competition in episode 10.)	35.8	33.7				175.1	35.0
7	Raelia	33.9	30.9	40.3	40.7	31.4	36.3	41.9	34.2	35.4					325.0	36.1
8	Mirjana	37.9	29.4	39.0	43.2	33.2	35.9	38.8	33.9						291.3	36.4
9	Denzel	37.3	28.2	35.6	38.2	36.3	37.2	35.4							248.2	35.5
10	Matthew	37.7	30.3	37.9	38.3	35.1	35.2								214.4	35.7
11	Kari	35.4	26.4	35.2	37.5	30.8									165.3	33.0
12	Ben	36.9	33.7	34.6	30.3										135.5	33.9
13	Romeo	36.7	28.8	DQ (Note: Romeo was disqualified in episode 5.)											65.5	32.7
14	Ivy	32.8													32.8	32.8

Indicates the contestant won the competition.
Indicates the contestant had the highest score that week.
Indicates the contestant was eliminated that week.
Indicates the contestant was in the bottom two that week.
Indicates the contestant was disqualified that week.
Indicates the contestant was originally eliminated that week, but was saved.

=== Photo shoot guide ===
- Episode 1 photo shoot: Runway selfies (casting)
- Episode 2 photo shoots: Four seasons wardrobe in the subway; leather swimwear on the beach (casting)
- Episode 3 video & photo shoot: Opening titles; wet and wild in black and white
- Episode 4 photo shoot: Twofold illusion atmosphere
- Episode 5 commercial: Black widow fragrance in pairs
- Episode 6 motion shoot: Hair whipping & flipping
- Episode 7 photo shoot: Frostbitten at an ice rink
- Episode 8 photo shoot: Futuristic heritage with Corybot
- Episode 9 photo shoot: Mitch Stone essentials ad campaign
- Episode 10 photo shoot: Composite couples for HIV awareness
- Episode 12 photo shoot: MCM Bags at Seoul City Hall
- Episode 13 photo shoot: Jinny Kim shoes at Gyeongbokgung Palace
- Episode 14 photo shoot: Portraying Elvis Presley and Marilyn Monroe
- Episode 15 photo shoots: Tyra Beauty campaign; Guess campaign
- Episode 16 photo shoot: Nylon magazine spreads

=== Makeovers ===
- Romeo – Dyed ice blonde with grey contacts
- Ben – Buzz cut
- Kari – Long ice blonde weave with bleached eyebrows; later, bangs added
- Matthew – Shaved sides
- Denzel – Lace front beard weave
- Mirjana – Karlie Kloss inspired blunt bob cut
- Raelia – Voluminous curly weave like afro
- Chantelle – Ombre style long weave
- Shei – Half platinum blonde and half jet black ala Melanie Martinez with matching eyebrows
- Lenox – Dyed dark brown, tips trimmed
- Adam – Buzz cut
- Will – Pompadour style
- Keith – No makeover
