= India Gants =

American fashion model (born 1996)

- Born: India Kate Gants; June 11, 1996 (age 29); Seattle, Washington, U.S.
- Occupation: Model
- Years active: 2017–present
- Modeling information
- Height: 5 ft 8.5 in (1.74 m)
- Hair color: Blonde
- Eye color: Green
- Agency: Seattle Models Guild; Major Model Management; First Access Management; Next Model Management LA; Newmodel Agency; ARTRoom Model Management; Ford Models; SMG Model Management

India Kate Gants (born June 11, 1996) is an American fashion model. She is best known for winning the twenty-third cycle of America's Next Top Model in 2017.

== Early life ==
Gants was born in Seattle, Washington. She has three younger siblings. She started modeling when she was 16. She graduated from Newport High School in 2014. Gants lived in Bellevue before auditioning for Top Model.

== Career ==
=== America's Next Top Model ===
In 2016–2017, Gants appeared in the twenty-third cycle of VH1's America's Next Top Model, where she competed against thirteen other contestants. During the show, many comparisons were made of her and Gigi Hadid. At the final deliberation in the season finale, she beat fellow competitor Tatiana Price, becoming the twenty-third winner of the show. Among Gants' prizes for winning America's Next Top Model were a talent contract with VH1, a fashion spread in Paper magazine and a $100,000 contract with Rimmel London cosmetics.

Gants win also means that she is the seventh winner of America's Next Top Model to have never made an appearance in the bottom two, along with Jaslene Gonzalez, McKey Sullivan, Nicole Fox, Krista White, Sophie Sumner and Jourdan Miller.

=== Post Top Model ===
Following her win on America's Next Top Model, Gants signed a contract with Major Model Management in Milan. She is also signed with Ford Models in New York City. She is still signed with Seattle Models Guild.

Gants appeared in the season three premiere episode of Odd Mom Out in July 2017.

Gants also started working in the music industry as a DJ. She also appeared in the lyric video for WISH I WAS's "Go For A Ride".

In 2021 India appeared and starred in the music video for the Emo revival band Your Broken Hero's song Tommy's Face.

Preceded by Nyle DiMarco	America's Next Top Model winner Cycle 23 (2016–2017)	Succeeded by Kyla Coleman
