= Keith Carlos =

American football wide receiver and fashion model

- Born: December 19, 1987 (age 38); Bridgeport, Connecticut, U.S.
- Known for: The first male winner of America's Next Top Model
- Modeling information
- Height: 6 ft 2 in (1.88 m)
- Hair color: Black
- Eye color: Brown
- Agency: NEXT Model Management
- Website: www.nextmanagement.com/los-angeles/profile/keith-carlos

Keith Carlos
No. 1
- Position: Wide receiver

Personal information
- Listed height: 6 ft 2 in (1.88 m)
- Listed weight: 200 lb (91 kg)

Career information
- High school: Bridgeport (CT) Central
- College: Purdue
- NFL draft: 2011: undrafted

Career history
- Philadelphia Eagles (2011)*; New York Giants (2013)*
- * Offseason or practice squad member only

Keith Kasson Carlos (born December 19, 1987) is an American former football wide receiver and fashion model who became the first male winner of America's Next Top Model.

== Early life ==
Carlos attended Central High School in Bridgeport, Connecticut.

== College career ==
=== Lackawanna College ===
After high school, Carlos attended Lackawanna College.

College recruiting
Name	Hometown	School	Height	Weight	40^{‡}	Commit date
Keith Carlos; WR	Bridgeport, Connecticut	Lackawanna College	6 ft 2 in (1.88 m)	200 lb (91 kg)	4.27	Feb 26, 2008
Keith Carlos; WR	Recruit ratings: Rivals:					
Overall recruit ranking: Scout: JC (RB) Rivals: -- (WR), -- (CT)
Note: In many cases, Scout, Rivals, 247Sports, On3, and ESPN may conflict in their listings of height and weight.; In these cases, the average was taken. ESPN grades are on a 100-point scale.; Sources: "Purdue Football Commitment List". Rivals.; "Purdue College Football Recruiting Commits". Scout.; "ESPN". ESPN.; "Scout.com Team Recruiting Rankings". Scout.; "2009 Team Ranking". Rivals.com.

Carlos committed to Purdue University on February 24, 2009. Carlos also received scholarships from three other FBS schools: Kansas State, Rutgers, and Temple. While at Purdue, Carlos was initiated into the Nu chapter of Kappa Alpha Psi fraternity.

=== Purdue ===
Carlos's play netted him a scholarship to continue his football career at Purdue University. He was named a starting wide receiver for four games through the season in 2009. In 2010, Carlos changed his position to running back for the Boilermakers, after an injury to Ralph Bolden. Carlos went on to finish third on the team in rushing yards (337) and touchdowns (2). Carlos graduated from Purdue with a bachelor's degree in business administration.

== NFL career ==
=== Philadelphia Eagles ===
Carlos signed with the Philadelphia Eagles of the National Football League (NFL) in 2011.

=== New York Giants ===
On June 3, 2013, Carlos was signed by the New York Giants. On August 20, 2013, he was waived as injured by the Giants. On August 21, 2013, he cleared waivers and was placed on the Giants' injured reserve list. On August 27, 2013, he was waived with an injury settlement.

== America’s Next Top Model ==
Before his early retirement from football, Carlos had done a small number of modeling jobs. In 2011, he was the Krave magazine "Krave Kover Winner." The following year, Carlos appeared in the "Made Love Lately" music video by Day26 and was named an “unforgettable face” in a 2013 edition of Essence magazine.

In 2014, Carlos auditioned for the twenty-first cycle of America's Next Top Model. On December 6, 2014, Carlos was named the first male winner of America's Next Top Model; his prizes comprised a contract with NEXT Model Management, a photo shoot for Nylon magazine, and a cash prize of $100,000.

Carlos played the love interest in the "Be Careful" music video by Cardi B.

Preceded by Jourdan Miller	America's Next Top Model winner Cycle 21 (2014)	Succeeded by Nyle DiMarco
