= Laura Kirkpatrick =

American model and fashion designer (born 1989)

- Born: Laura Sioux Kirkpatrick; June 12, 1989 (age 37); Stanford, Kentucky, U.S.
- Children: 1
- Modeling information
- Height: 5 ft 6 in (1.68 m)
- Hair color: Auburn
- Eye color: Blue
- Agency: New York Model Management
- Website: www.laurasmodellife.com

Laura Sioux Kirkpatrick (born June 12, 1989) is an American model and fashion designer, best known as the runner-up of cycle 13 of America's Next Top Model. She was voted fan favorite in a poll the show held after the conclusion of the series, which won her a six-month, rent-free apartment in New York City.

== Early life ==
Kirkpatrick was born in Stanford, Kentucky, to father Greg Kirkpatrick and mother Jodie Hill Jones. She has two younger sisters, Hannah and Jarah, and a younger brother named Jeremy. She previously has worked on her family's farm, where working with cattle was one of her primary jobs. She has dyslexia. Prior to her appearance on America's Next Top Model, she had been working as a waitress. Kirkpatrick was majoring in art at Eastern Kentucky University in Richmond, Kentucky, before joining the show, and was the first in her family to attend college. However, she missed final exams due to America's Next Top Model, which prevented her from advancing from freshman to sophomore.

== America's Next Top Model ==
=== America's Next Top Model Cycle 13: the "Petite Edition" ===
Kirkpatrick had been pursuing a modeling career for years prior to her appearance on the CW Network reality television show America's Next Top Model, and had looked into applying for the series before, but was a half-inch shorter than the 5'7" height cutoff. Her grandmother, who Kirkpatrick considers her best friend, told Kirkpatrick to try out for Cycle 13: the "petite edition", because it specifically sought contestants who are 5'7" or under. Kirkpatrick said it was a last-minute, "spur-of-the-moment" decision to visit Chicago, Illinois, where she successfully applied to be on the season. Kirkpatrick was the last (fourteenth) contestant (edited as the second last (thirteenth) contestant called and followed by Sundai Love when aired) selected as one of the 14 contestants to compete in Cycle 13: the "Petite Edition" of America's Next Top Model. Kirkpatrick, who was 19 when she started on the show, was consistently considered one of the judges' favorite contestants throughout the season. She was particularly praised by the judges and reviewers for her strong personality, which stood out as different from those of the other contestants due to her working-class, "country girl" lifestyle. She was also noted for her tendency to break into sudden fits of excitement and laughter. Her Kentucky accent has been identified as part of her charm, although during the show, judge and fashion photographer Nigel Barker said it could prove to be a hindrance during her modeling career. Barker said, "I know that in the back of their head, they don't want a CoverGirl with an accent, unless it is already somebody super-famous." Kirkpatrick initially tried to tone down her accent as a result of the comment, but stopped trying because she felt it made her "lose my spark". Kirkpatrick was never selected as one of the "bottom two" contestants for any of the challenges, though none of her photos were chosen as the best photo of the week. However, Kirkpatrick did exceptionally well on a group Cirque du Soleil-inspired shoot. Kirkpatrick said the Cirque du Soleil photo shoot was her favorite of the show, and that walking on the runway was her favorite part of the modeling experience.

Kirkpatrick's dyslexia proved to be a difficulty during some challenges, particularly when she had to read teleprompters for CoverGirl television commercials, which was one of the final contests of the season. Throughout the show, Kirkpatrick spoke fondly of her grandmother, Wanda Sue Kirkpatrick, during taped segments and often wore dresses designed by her grandmother during the judges' comments. Wanda Sue also made a dress for Tyra Banks, which she wore on the show. She was the second contestant selected as a finalist over both Jennifer An and Erin Wagner and became the first contestant in ANTM history to reach the final two without ever receiving a first call-out during her time competing. Kirkpatrick ultimately lost to Nicole Fox, who was named "America's Next Top Model" on November 18, 2009. Kirkpatrick and Fox became friends during the season and, although Kirkpatrick believed her personality was strong, she also admitted Fox's photos were particularly strong. Kirkpatrick initially reacted emotionally to her loss and was comforted by the show's host, retired supermodel Tyra Banks. She said of her initial reaction to the loss: "I was really devastated at the time and cried forever until my eyes swelled up and popped out of my head!"

=== America's Next Top Model Cycle 17: All Stars ===
It was announced on May 12, 2011, that Kirkpatrick would join the cast again for "America's Next Top Model: All-Stars" with several returning models and was placed fourth. Over her stay, Kirkpatrick received two first call-outs, won one challenge and appeared twice in the two bottom two where she survived over Shannon Stewart and was eliminated when Allison Harvard survived her first-ever bottom two appearance during "America's Next Top Model: All-Stars".

Like all the other contestants on Cycle 17, Kirkpatrick was given a branding word: "loveable". During her time on the show she developed her own perfume called "Love" and performed in a music video for her song "Southern Sweet Girl."

== Modeling career ==
Although Kirkpatrick did not win America's Next Top Model, she was voted fan favorite in a poll the show held after the conclusion of the series. Although the margin was not reported, Kirkpatrick said the producers told her she won by "a whole lot." As a result of the win, Kirkpatrick was awarded a six-month, rent-free apartment stay in New York City to pursue modeling opportunities. Kirkpatrick received several representation offers from modeling agencies, including Tyra Banks' Bankable Productions. Kirkpatrick also appeared on Banks' talk show, "The Tyra Banks Show." Kirkpatrick participated in charity print work for 2010 Haiti earthquake relief.

Kirkpatrick was featured in Steve Madden's Summer 2010 Collection and in 2011, had a cover and spread in LexScene magazine. In 2013, she was featured in British Vogue.

Shortly after her appearance on ANTM, Kirkpatrick started a dyslexia foundation, The Beautiful Minds. The foundation hosts runway shows and other events to raise awareness for dyslexia education.

In 2011, she appeared in William Fitzsimmons, "Beautiful Girl" music video.

== Designing ==
Kirkpatrick has a clothing line, Grumbage.

== Personal life ==
Kirkpatrick now uses the name Laura Sioux Cianciolo, and in January 2021 was profiled by Cincinnati magazine:

You might recognize Laura Cianciolo (née Kirkpatrick) from her successful stint on America's Next Top Model, where the Kentucky native’s charming accent and bubbly personality earned her the title of both runner-up and fan favorite. Today, Cianciolo balances an active modeling career, several small businesses, and life as a single mother.
