= Jourdan Miller =

American fashion model (born 1993)

- Born: October 6, 1993 (age 32); Olympia, Washington, U.S.
- Modeling information
- Height: 6 ft 0 in (1.83 m)
- Hair color: Brown
- Eye color: Blue
- Website: lovejourdan.com

Jourdan Miller (born October 6, 1993) is an American fashion model, best known for winning the twentieth cycle of America's Next Top Model. She is also the only female contestant to have won a cycle that included male contestants; the other two cycles that followed were both won by male contestants.

== Early life ==
Miller was born in Olympia, Washington. In 2001, Miller's family relocated to Bend, Oregon where she was raised with her two sisters. Prior to her appearance on America's Next Top Model, Miller studied at Mountain View High School in Bend. She was previously signed to Code Model Management in New York.

== Career ==
=== America's Next Top Model ===
In 2013, Miller appeared in Cycle 20 of the CW Network reality television show America's Next Top Model, in which she competed against fifteen other aspiring models. In the competition, Miller was one of the front-runners, having never placed below fifth after the first panel, where she was placed tenth. She was one of the strongest of her cycle, having won a total of five challenges and received six first call-outs. Also, Miller's photograph from the paint photoshoot was deemed by Tyra Banks as one of the best produced in the history of the show. In Week 8, Miller failed to book any shows during LA Style Fashion Week. At the final runway show in Bali, Miller faced difficulty when she accidentally stumbled with her stilettos on her gown. Despite this, the judges were still impressed by her walk. At the final deliberation, the judges noted Miller's command on the runway, her fluidity, as well as her high-fashion and girl-next-door appeal. She would eventually beat fellow competitor Marvin Cortes in the cycle finale, becoming the twentieth winner of America's Next Top Model.

Miller's win also means that she is the sixth winner of America's Next Top Model to have never made an appearance in the bottom two, along with Jaslene Gonzalez, McKey Sullivan, Nicole Fox, Krista White, Sophie Sumner and later winner India Gants. Miller also became the second America's Next Top Model winner to have also never even appeared in the bottom three. This was preceded by cycle 13 winner Nicole Fox. She is also the second winner of the show to have received a total of six first call-outs after Ann Ward, the winner of cycle 15

After winning America's Next Top Model, Miller received a modeling contract with NEXT Model Management in Los Angeles, an eight-page spread in the December/January 2014 issue of Nylon magazine and a $100,000-ad campaign with Guess.

=== Post Top Model ===
Following her win in America's Next Top Model, Miller was featured in a segment for the November 22, 2013 episode of VH1's Best Week Ever and OK!TV in December 2013. In 2014, Miller appeared on the cover and spread for the February issue of Cleo magazine Malaysia, and an editorial for August Man magazine Malaysia. She has recently fronted the covers of SÝN magazine, Swiss Made Magazine, Blum Magazine and Desnudo Italia, and has editorial spreads in Ellements, Kode, Creem, Remix, 35mm, Flesh, Cake, and Jute magazines. She also appeared in the music video for Fences song “Sunburns”, “Restless Heart” by Finnish singer Niila and “Lemon Drop” by Absofacto.

| Preceded by Laura James | America's Next Top Model winner Cycle 20 (2013) | Succeeded by Keith Carlos |
