= Allison Harvard =

American model

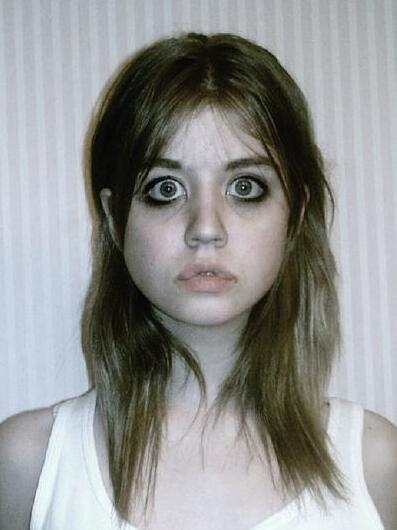
- Harvard in 2005
- Born: January 8, 1988 (age 38); Houston, Texas, U.S.
- Education: Louisiana State University; University of New Orleans
- Occupations: Model; artist; photographer; actress
- Years active: 2009–present
- Spouse: Jeremy Burke (m. 2021)
- Children: 1
- Modeling information
- Height: 5 ft 10 in (178 cm)
- Hair color: Brown
- Eye color: Blue

Allison Harvard Burke (January 8, 1988) is an American model, artist, actress, and Internet celebrity, best known as the runner-up of America's Next Top Model Cycle 12 and 17: All-Stars. Harvard has appeared on a number of magazine covers, such as Harper's Bazaar, L'Officiel, ONE, WeTheUrban, and one of the Philippines' leading fashion magazines, Mega. She was the brand endorser of the Belo Medical Group and covered their special edition magazine.

== Early life ==
Harvard was born in Houston, Texas, and raised in New Orleans, Louisiana. She attended Louisiana State University in Baton Rouge before transferring to the University of New Orleans, where she studied art during Spring 2009. Her artwork is featured in the 2007 novel The Story Told at Night by Liza Kuznetsova.

In 2005, before her appearance on America's Next Top Model, Harvard gained notoriety as an Internet meme on 4chan, where she became known as Creepy-chan.

== America's Next Top Model ==
=== America's Next Top Model Cycle 12 ===
After being contacted through an email by a casting agent who had seen her look online, Harvard successfully auditioned for the reality television show America's Next Top Model Cycle 12. During the audition, Harvard stated that she thought nosebleeds were pretty, and that she was fascinated by blood.

Harvard was the fourth contestants selected (after Aminat Ayinde, Natalie Pack and Fo Porter) for the top thirteen. Her roommates on the Upper East Side of Manhattan in New York City home were Isabella Falk, Kortnie Coles, Sandra Nyanchoka, London Levi-Nance, Natalie Pack and Celia Ammerman. Over her stay, Harvard received four first call-outs and was selected to participate in two challenge prizes won by fellow contestant Celia Ammerman. Harvard had two collective bottom two appearances. The first where she overanalyzed her shoot with London Levi-Nance which she survived over Nijah Harris who was eliminated third in her first ever bottom two appearance. The second time Harvard was called forward was for her lackluster commercial and her one-dimensional look that led the judges to question her versatility. This time Harvard survived for the second time over Tahlia Brookins who was eliminated sixth in her first ever bottom two appearance.

During the Cycle 12 Finale of ANTM in Sao Paulo, Brazil, Harvard shot a convincing CoverGirl commercial and was praised for her improvement from the previous commercial. Despite Harvard's (and Aminat Ayinde's) better performances in the CoverGirl commercial, Teyona Anderson was ultimately crowned the twelfth winner of America's Next Top Model.

=== America's Next Top Model Cycle 17: All-Stars ===
After her first appearance on the show, Harvard was selected to return to America's Next Top Model to represent Cycle 12 (along with fellow semifinalist, later Cycle 14 contestant Angelea Preston) on the first All-Star edition of the show along with twelve other returning models from past America's Next Top Model cycles. Throughout the competition, Harvard developed her own perfume, performed in a music video for her song "Underwater", won two challenges, received two first call-outs and survived her first-ever bottom two appearance over Laura Kirkpatrick from America's Next Top Model Cycle 13: the "Petite Edition".

== Career ==
In June 2009, Harvard signed with the Los Angeles-based Nous Model Management, but as of 2012 was no longer included in the agency's roster. Since ANTM, Harvard has modelled for KarmaLoop, walked at the 2012 New York Fashion Week for Gemma Kahng and Malan Breton, and was featured in a spread for ONE Magazine. She has also modelled for Chromat and Richie Rich.

Harvard served as the face of Michael Cinco's "Impalpable" perfume with international male model Tierry Vilson, and walked in the Philippine Fashion Week 2012 with fellow All-Stars contestant Dominique Reighard in Bench fashion shows. She was on the cover of the fifth issue of online publication WeTheUrban. In mid-2012, she appeared in promotional photos for G Fine Body Art, a beauty brand that was set to launch glittery body art services at salons and spas starting later in the fall of 2012.

In celebration of Bench's twenty-fifth anniversary, Harvard walked the runway at Bench Universe: The 2012 Denim & Underwear Show in September 2012, along with Reighard and Sophie Sumner.

On October 6, 2012, Harvard made an appearance in an episode of I Am Meg: Own the World in Style, a Philippine TV Lifestyle show on ETC.

On October 10, 2012, a behind-the-scenes clip showed Harvard in a fashion shoot for Bello Magazine, titled "Hippie Trail". On October 17, Harvard walked for NAVEN at the Los Angeles Fashion Week.

In October 2013, it was announced that Harvard would be one of the hosts of the Philippine television show Mega Fashion Crew: Reloaded on ETC. In 2014, she became one of the judges in a dance competition television show Celebrity Dance Battle in Philippines, which premiered on TV5 on March 22. In August 2014, Harvard booked another show for Bench called The Naked Truth and established CatxBench, a watercolor illustration designed by her, as a part of Bench Collection in December. The same month, she was a guest judge for the grand finals of Miss Earth 2014, and also appeared on America's Next Top Model to shoot in Tyra's new makeup line called TYRA along with the finalist of the season. She was also featured in the March 2015 issue of High Street Magazine with her boyfriend, Jeremy Burke.

Harvard confirmed that she would judge the Cosplay Authority Global Challenge (The CAGE) co-located with AsiaPOP Comicon Manila 2015 in Manila.

=== Acting ===
Harvard made her acting debut as the character Carina in the independent feature film Insensate. The film was released early August 2013 on iTunes and later on Amazon.

Harvard performed as Madeline in the live musical "Cages" by Woolf and the Wondershow.

== Personal life ==
Harvard married her boyfriend of seven years, Jeremy Burke, in San Luis Obispo, California, in October 2021. Their son was born in 2024.

== Filmography ==
Year	Film	Role	Notes
2012	Insensate	Carina	
TBA	Dangerous Words from the Fearless	The Girl	Completed

== Television ==
Year	Film	Role	Notes
2009	America's Next Top Model (season 12)	Herself	Contestant
2011	America's Next Top Model (season 17)	Herself	Contestant
2012	Philippine Fashion Week	Herself	Model
2012	Bench Universe: The 2012 Denim & Underwear Show	Herself	Model
2012	I Am Meg: Own the World in Style	Herself	Judge
2013	Mega Fashion Crew: Reloaded	Herself	Judge
2014	Celebrity Dance Battle Philippines	Herself	Judge
2014	Bench: The Naked Truth	Herself	Model
2014	The Tim Yap Show Season V	Herself	Guest
2014	America's Next Top Model (season 21)	Herself	Guest Star
2014	Miss Earth 2014	Herself	Judge
2015	Kababayan Today	Herself	Guest

=== Music videos ===
Year	Title	Artist	Role	Notes
2019	"On Graveyard Hill"	Pixies	Young Woman	Directed by Kii Arens and Bobbi Rich
