= Julia Clancey =

Fashion designer

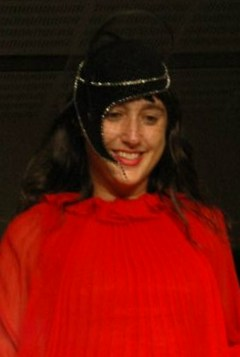
Julia Clancey at Fall 2008 London Fashion Week

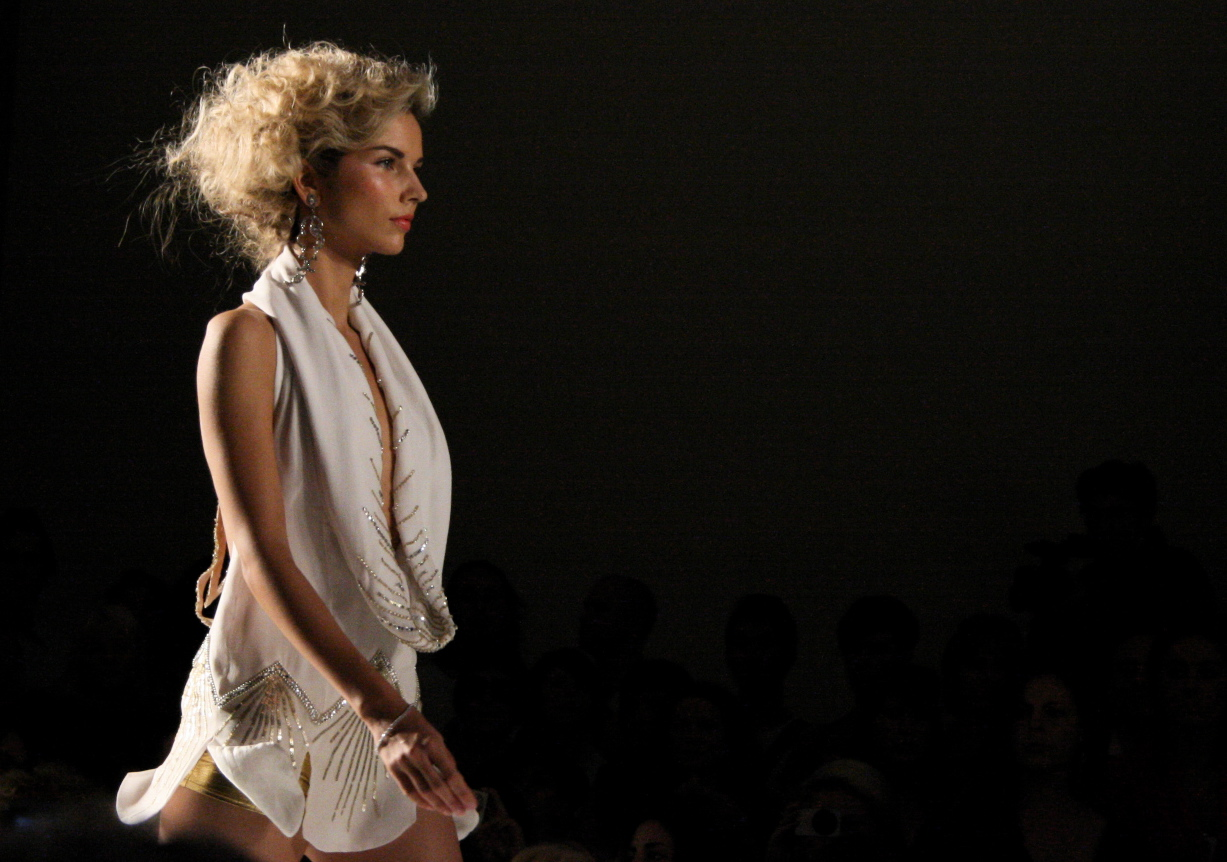
Model wearing a Julia Clancey design at Spring 2008 London Fashion Week

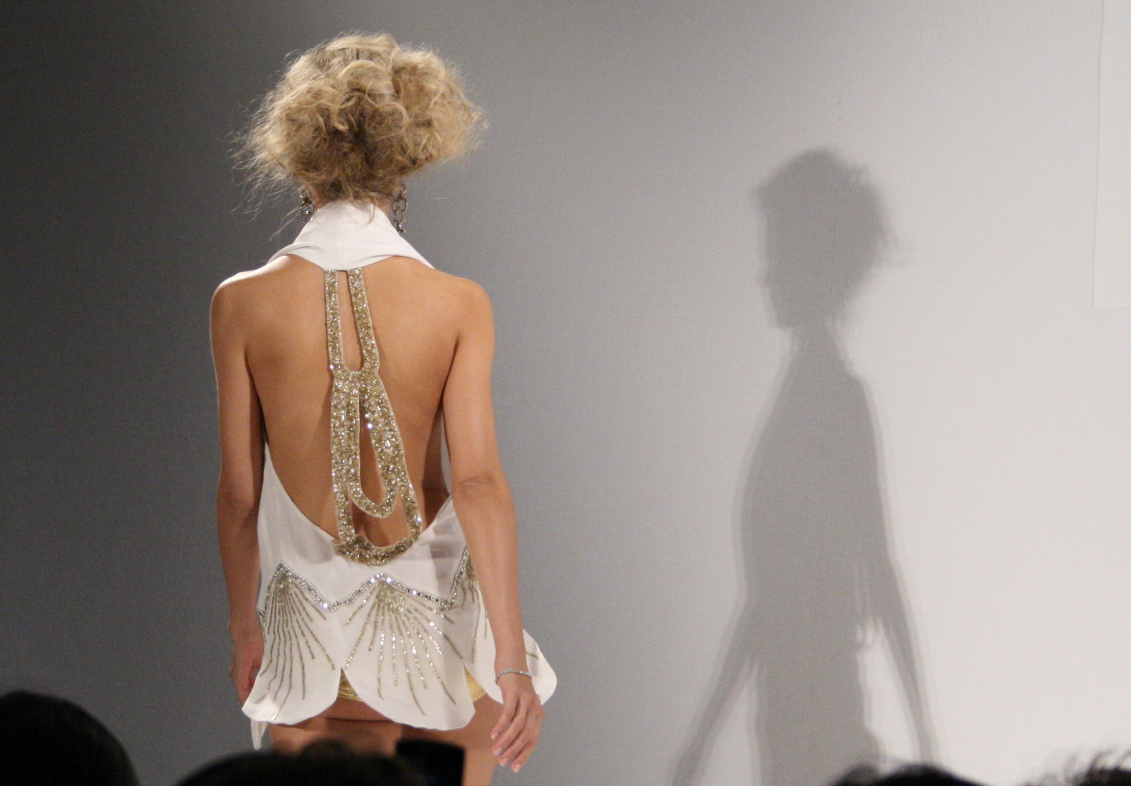
Model wearing a Julia Clancey design at Spring 2008 London Fashion Week

Julia Clancey is a London-based fashion designer. Her clothes have been shown at London Fashion Week and featured in magazines including Vogue and ELLE.

== Aesthetic ==
Clancey primarily designs dresses and tops. Clancey describes her aesthetic as glamorous and fun, and says her clothes are "floaty and very feminine based on silk georgettes, chiffons and satins." Her target market is 25- to 40-year-olds. Representative garments are ballet skirts, baby-doll dresses, and crystal-encrusted accessories.

== History ==
Clancey has no formal college education in fashion. For her first ten years in the fashion industry, she worked in various capacities, including Editor of ‘Large’ magazine and Fashion Editor of ‘Cream’ magazine in Sydney, Australia and by styling for musicians as well as taking on numerous advertising campaigns and creative projects.

Over time, her work became noticed by celebrity clients, including Victoria Beckham, Dita Von Teese, Mischa Barton and Cameron Diaz. This led her to create the 'Willie Mays' label and eventually to re-launch under her own name for Spring 2003.

A few years ago, Clancey was awarded a £25,000 grant that allowed her to work free out of a small studio at the London College of Fashion in Hackney. At the end of July 2007, Clancey will be moving to a new studio in the Ladbroke Grove area.

== Julia Clancey today ==
Clancey regularly shows her collection during London Fashion Week. Notable press includes garments featured in the pages of Vogue, Glamour, InStyle, ELLE, GQ, FHM, and Tatler.

Julia Clancey products are sold in boutiques in England, France, Spain, Australia, Saudi Arabia, Lebanon, Kuwait, and Russia. Her primary business is done domestically, in London.

Clancey's Fall 2007 collection was influenced by the clothing of the 1920s.
