= Natalie Pack =

American Model (born 1989)

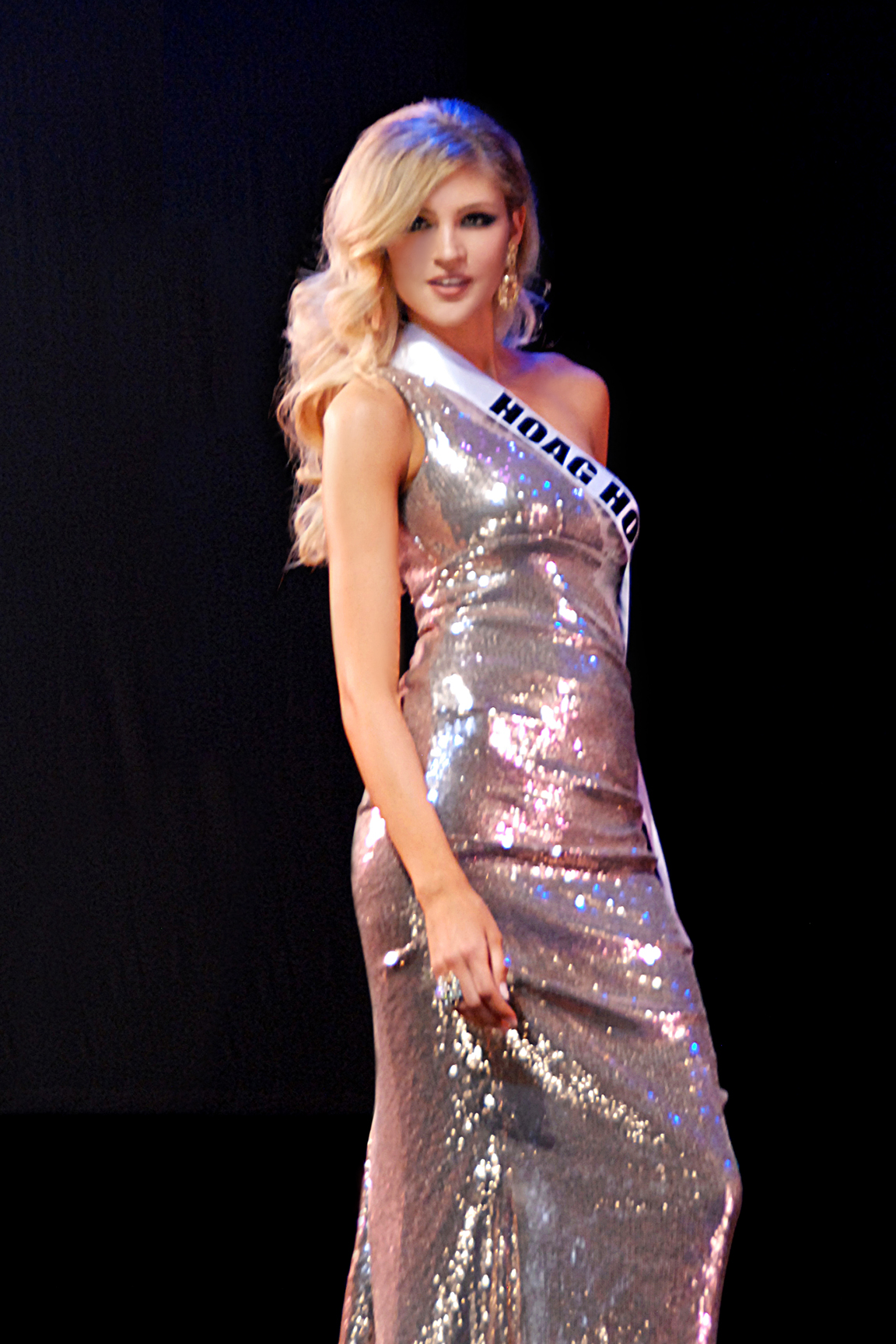
- Natalie in 2012
- Born: Natalie Ann Pack; March 30, 1989 (age 37); Palos Verdes, California, U.S.
- Occupations: Former model, realtor
- Height: 6 ft 0 in (1.83 m)
- Spouse: Aaron O'Connell (m. 2018)
- Beauty pageant titleholder
- Title: Miss California USA 2012
- Agency: Ford Models, L.A. Models, Elite Model Management
- Hair color: Blonde
- Eye color: Hazel
- Major competitions: Miss California USA 2012 (Winner); Miss USA 2012

Natalie Ann Pack (born March 30, 1989) is an American fashion model and real estate agent who held the title of Miss California USA 2012. She is also known for competing on America's Next Top Model, Cycle 12.

== Early life ==
Pack was born and raised in Palos Verdes, California. She currently lives in Newport Beach, California and attended the University of California, Irvine, where she was on the Dean's List. In 2012 Pack interned at Hoag Memorial Hospital Presbyterian and hoped to go to medical school to become an OBGYN.

In 2005, Pack appeared in an episode of The Dog Whisperer with Cesar Millan.

== Career ==
=== America's Next Top Model ===
At the age of 19, Pack was the second contestant (after Aminat Ayinde) to be selected to participate on the twelfth cycle of America's Next Top Model. Over her stay, she won three challenges (two individually and one with fellow contestant Fo Porter), received one second call-out and one third call-out. Pack also did not receive a makeover because host Tyra Banks believed she looked modelesque as she was. After Aminat Ayinde survived her second consecutive bottom two appearance, Pack was the eighth contestant eliminated from the competition and the first to be eliminated abroad in Sao Paulo, Brazil after a photo shoot where the contestants emulated the late Carmen Miranda. Judges Miss J. Alexander and Fernanda Motta believed that she looked "exhausted" and that "the sparkle was missing" in Pack's photo, despite Pack's insistence that Jay Manuel was complimentary of her photos.

Following her elimination from America's Next Top Model, Pack signed to Ford Models in Los Angeles and is currently signed with NEXT Model Management in Miami. She has modeled for Jockey International and BL!SSS magazine. She has also walked for Billabong and Dona Daneshi. In 2015, she was featured in ads for Guess.

Pack appeared in a Top Models in Action segment during an episode of Cycle 13.

=== Miss California USA ===
Pack participated in the Miss California USA pageant as "Miss Hoag Hospital", where she was interning while attending University of California, Irvine. Despite never having participated in any previous beauty pageants, Pack won the title and was crowned by outgoing titleholder (and Miss Teen USA 2006) Katie Blair. She competed in the Miss USA 2012 competition on June 3, 2012 in Las Vegas, Nevada, and failed to place, ending California's seven-year streak of consecutive placements in Miss USA, from 2005 through 2011.

=== Filmography ===
Film roles
| Year | Title | Role | Notes |
|---|---|---|---|
| 2015 | This is Sinterklaas | Mrs. Sinterklaas | Short film |
| 2018 | This Is Our Christmas | Laura Winslow | Also as story editor |

Television roles
| Year | Title | Role | Notes |
|---|---|---|---|
| 2009 | America's Next Top Model | Herself | 13 episodes |
| 2012 | The 2012 Miss USA Pageant | Herself / Miss California USA | TV special |

=== Real estate ===
In April 2018 she announced on Twitter and Instagram that she had passed her real estate exam. and later joined her father's Real Estate business, operating as "The Pack Team".

== Personal life ==
In September 2017, Pack became engaged to boyfriend, actor Aaron O'Connell. On July 21, 2018, Natalie and Aaron O'Connell were married in Italy.

Awards and achievements
| Preceded by Katie Blair | Miss California USA; 2012 | Succeeded by Mabelynn Capeluj |
