= America's Next Top Model season 13 =

America's Next Top Model
- Season 13
- Judges: Tyra Banks; Nigel Barker; J. Alexander
- Winner: Nicole Fox
- No. of episodes: 13

Release
- Original network: The CW
- Original release: September 9 – November 18, 2009

Additional information
- Filming dates: May 28 – July 7, 2009

Season chronology
- ← Previous; Season 12 Next → Season 14

The thirteenth cycle of America's Next Top Model premiered on September 9, 2009, and was the seventh season to be aired on The CW network. The cycle's catch phrase is "'The Lineup Is 5' 7" And Under. Not the Usual Suspects. BOOK 'EM!", and the promotional song was "Good Girls Go Bad" by Cobra Starship featuring Leighton Meester. The ending/elimination song, entitled "Top Model", is sung by Marvin Fequiere, husband of cycle 10 contestant Stacy-Ann Fequiere.

The prizes for this cycle are:

- A modeling contract with Wilhelmina Models, replacing Elite Model Management
- A fashion spread and cover in Seventeen
- A US$100,000 contract with CoverGirl cosmetics

The destination for this cycle was Wailea, Maui, Hawaii, making this the first cycle to be filmed entirely in the United States.

The winner was Nicole Fox from Louisville, Colorado making her the youngest winner at the age of 18. Laura Kirkpatrick placed as the runner up.

== Season summary ==
This cycle featured one major change to the judging panel: judge Paulina Porizkova left the show after the previous season, marking the first change to the judging panel since Cycle 10. With her departure, only three permanent judges remained, a first for the series.

This cycle also moved back to Los Angeles, after being filmed in New York City for cycle 12. The cast size was once again increased to 14 contestants. All of the contestants for this season were of height 5'7" or shorter.

== Contestants ==
(Ages stated are at start of contest)

Contestant	Age	Height	Hometown	Finish	Place
Amber DePace	18	5 ft 6 in (1.68 m)	Oceanside, California	Episode 1	15 (quit)
Lisa Ramos	19	5 ft 5 in (1.65 m)	Queens, New York	Episode 2	14
Rachel Echelberger	18	5 ft 5 in (1.65 m)	Woodland, California	Episode 3	13
Courtney Davies	22	5 ft 4 in (1.63 m)	Plantation, Florida	Episode 3	12
Lulu Braithwaite	19	5 ft 7 in (1.70 m)	Brooklyn, New York	Episode 4	11
Bianca Richardson	21	5 ft 7 in (1.70 m)	Columbia, South Carolina	Episode 5	10
Ashley Howard	22	5 ft 6 in (1.68 m)	Chicago, Illinois	Episode 6	9
Kara Vincent	18	5 ft 7 in (1.70 m)	Fort Wayne, Indiana	Episode 7	8
Ashley 'Rae' Weisz	21	5 ft 6 in (1.68 m)	Rochester, Minnesota	Episode 8	7
Brittany Markert	21	5 ft 5 in (1.65 m)	Livermore, California	Episode 9	6
Sundai Love	18	5 ft 3 in (1.60 m)	Bakersfield, California	Episode 10	5
Jennifer An	23	5 ft 5 in (1.65 m)	Philadelphia, Pennsylvania	Episode 11	4–3
Erin Wagner	18	5 ft 6 in (1.68 m)	Spring Grove, Illinois	Episode 11	4–3
Laura Kirkpatrick	19	5 ft 6 in (1.68 m)	Stanford, Kentucky	Episode 12	2
Nicole Fox	18	5 ft 7 in (1.70 m)	Louisville, Colorado	Episode 12	1

== Episodes ==
No. overall	No. in season	Title	Original release date	US viewers (millions)
149	1	"How Short Can You Go"	September 9, 2009	3.24
For the first time, contestants under 5'7" (170cm) are cast. They enter a room where they are supposedly being cast for Le Cycle 13, Fall Collection, but an actor tells them that they are too short, at which point Tyra enters and tells them 'it's time to break the mold'. Soon after they dress in model basics and are given a runway lesson by Miss J and have a face Polaroid taken by Mr. Jay. Then comes castings. Memorable interviews include Courtney revealing she has a broken foot, modeling teacher Alison teaching Miss J her own runway tricks, Lulu stating she is gay within seconds of her entrance and Sundai talking about her abusive childhood. During this time, Amber's personality and Nicole's lack thereof scare their fellow competitors. 20 contestants are selected after the first cut and taken to a runway at the end of which they have to strike four poses. Courtney impresses Jay by soldiering on the entire runway instead of just posing. During the review, Tyra notes that many contestants are posing in a more sexual than fashion way. Ultimately 14 contestants are chosen and Tyra congratulates them for being pioneers.: Special guest: Bradford Sisk
150	2	"The Early Bird Gets a Makeover"	September 9, 2009	3.24
The contestants meet on Melrose Avenue and realize that Amber is missing. The Jays arrive in a limo and take them to a salon where it is revealed that Amber withdrew from the competition due to "personal reasons." Lisa, who had been cut in the Top 20, is replacing her. The Jays also announce that it is makeover time. Most of the contestants are satisfied with their looks, except Lisa, who worries that she didn't get much of a change and Bianca, who doesn't like her bleached eyebrows. The contestants then move into a doll-themed house. On the photo shoot, they are tasked to recreate their baby pictures with a fashion twist. Rae struggles with her 8-inch heels, while Sundai and Lisa worry about their styling. Arriving on set, Bianca seems down and tells Jay she doesn't like her make-up. At panel, Rae, Nicole, Jennifer, Ashley and Bianca are noted for their strong shots, while Brittany is castigated for her overtly sexual film. Kara and Sundai are told they lacked energy and Lisa is told that she looks mean. Ultimately, Bianca lands in the bottom two because of her lack of professionalism, but it is Lisa's poor performance at the shoot and timid personality that gets her eliminated as the judges feel she is not making the most of her second chance.: Featured photographer: Baldomero Fernandez; Special guests: Chanel Iman, Sally Hershberger
151	3	"Fortress of Fierceness"	September 16, 2009	2.79
The contestants meet Wilhelmina Models director Sean Patterson and Nigel Barker. Each contestant then meets them alone and Lulu loses points with Nigel by mentioning she doesn't pay attention to photographers in editorials while Courtney once again impresses by walking despite her pain. Rachel goes blank when asked about her musical background. After the meetings, Sean shocks the contestants by eliminating Rachel in a surprise elimination for her lack of charisma. The contestants then meet a rude photographer asking for the perfect shot in one take, which the contestants struggle with until Tyra (as Super Smize) arrives and "defeats" him. She then coaches the contestants on their "smize" (smiling with their eyes), which gets Jennifer worried because of her eyelid ptosis and directs a challenge where the girls are in full body suits, paired up and pitted against each other to see who has the best smize. The winners (Bianca, Brittany, Courtney, Kara, Laura, & Lulu) go to dinner with Sean Patterson, while the losers wash the dishes. Next, the contestants arrive at Santa Anita Race Track to pose topless with a jockey and a horse. At panel, Laura gave her most powerful photograph so far, while Erin also impress for smizing. Ashley is castigated for over posing and Bianca, despite her resolve not to complain, hints that she didn't like her blonde wig. This lands her in the bottom two again but she is spared for the second time as Courtney is sent home for admitting that being asked to keep her boot hindered her performance, and for self-defeating.: Featured photographer: Firooz Zahedi; Special guests: Sean Patterson, Lauren Conrad
152	4	"Make Me Tall"	September 23, 2009	2.82
The episode starts with Bianca being determined to become softer. Miss J introduced to a 9-year-old runway model named Diva Davanna, the contestants get their first runway teach with him, learning to "walk tall" and how to walk with a partner. The challenge later requires them to walk next to models who are 5'10" and above. Brittany impresses Ann Shoket and wins an editorial for herself, Kara and Laura, angering Ashley and Lulu who had earlier coached Brittany how to walk. Back at the house, Nicole bonds with Bianca as the latter reveals her fear of showing vulnerability due to her abusive past. Ashley and Lulu later warn Nicole that she is being used, upsetting her. Nicole and Brittany then discuss their chagrin, calling Ashley a mean-girl and Lulu her sidekick. At the photo shoot, Brittany struggles with the fact that the contestants are allowed to watch her, while Bianca has to be distracted to look softer. At panel, Kara, Nicole and Erin receive unanimous praise, whereas Brittany, Rae and Laura are castigated for making themselves look shorter. Sundai is praised for her picture but her outfit and lack of presence on the runway do not sit well with Miss J. In the end Brittany survives her first bottom two appearance as Lulu is eliminated for her poor performance at the shoot and uninspiring personality.: Featured photographer: Jonathan Mannion; Special guests: Diva Davanna, Kevan Hall, Yvonne Yue, Ann Shoket, Jaime Rishar; Top Model in Action: McKey Sullivan (cycle 11)
153	5	"Take My Photo, Tyra!"	September 30, 2009	3.28
The contestants are taught how to do their own make-up by Sam Fine and each contestant is given individual tips. Later they meet Nigel and Crissy Barker at Walmart for a CoverGirl challenge, where they have to race throughout the store and do their own styling and make-up through various sessions, with the last contestants eliminated at each session. Laura and Kara are the first to be eliminated, followed by Nicole and Jennifer and Brittany and Rae. At the last stop the contestants have to pick their pictures from a bin. Erin keeps Ashley's picture until she finds her own, eliminating Ashley. Bianca, Erin and Sundai finish the race, but ultimately Sundai wins to have her picture featured on Walmart's website and receive a US$1,000 gift from CoverGirl. On the way to the photo shoot, Bianca and Ashley confront Erin about her behavior at the challenge, making her cry. At the studio, the contestants find Tyra wrapped in scarves. Tyra explains that they will be doing a beauty shoot modeling scarves and that the best picture will be given immunity at panel. Brittany, Erin, Rae, Nicole and Sundai perform well. Ashley struggles a lot and has to change outfits three times. Kara is criticized for relying on her beauty, while Bianca is chastised for not displaying enough softness in her face. Meanwhile, Tyra decides to bring in a fan to improve Laura's performance and Jennifer tries screaming. Brittany is deemed the best and is given immunity as well as the opportunity to do a shoot with two male models that Tyra discovered. At panel, many contestants get good reviews. Jennifer is lauded by Tyra for bringing personality in her shoot, while Kara and Erin were chastised for not bringing any to theirs. Ashley and Bianca land in the bottom two: Ashley for failing to "smize" in her photo, and Bianca for looking hard in hers. Ultimately, Ashley is saved and Bianca is sent home after landing in the bottom two for the third time.: Featured photographer: Tyra Banks; Special guests: Crissy Barker, China Chow, Sam Fine, Juan Munoz Hortado, Gene Williamson; Top Model in Action: Samantha Francis (cycle 8)
154	6	"Dance With Me"	October 7, 2009	3.16
The contestants meet Benny Ninja, who tells them that as models, they must use their bodies as well as their faces to convey emotions. He brings out Lil Mama and Jabbawockeez to teach the contestants to dance. The contestants then learn that they will perform in groups of three, with masks covering their faces while showing happiness, sadness and anger. Jennifer, Rae and Kara work well together and win US$17,000 in jewelry. The contestants are flown to Las Vegas for their shoot. They witness a performance by Jay Manuel and the Cirque du Soleil and learn that they will be posing in teams. Jennifer, Kara, Ashley and Nicole get bad reviews, but Jennifer's group saved her as her group was deemed the best photo of the week (thus being jointly called together). The judges were also amazed in Laura and Rae's pictures, but worry about the latter's personality. Kara and Ashley land in the bottom two, both for not pushing through enough, but Kara is given another chance and Ashley, who was lambasted for failing to incorporate her dancer background in her posing, was eliminated.: Featured photographer: Mike Rosenthal; Special guests: Benny Ninja, Jabbawockeez, Josie Maran, Lil Mama, Rhonda Faber Green; Top Model in Action: Lisa Jackson (cycle 9)
155	7	"Petite Ninja Warriors"	October 14, 2009	3.00
The contestants are driven to Wilhelmina and are told they will go on go-sees in pairs (Nicole & Laura, Brittany & Kara, Erin & Jennifer and Rae & Sundai). They are given a car by each pair, but must navigate themselves with the aid of a map. The go-sees include an audition for a commercial, which most of the contestants fail at, except for Nicole, who is eager to make-up for her previous bad week. Sundai and Rae try to squeeze in one last go-see, and end up being disqualified for being late in Los Angeles traffic. Nicole is declared the winner and rewarded a piece from each designer's collection and is told she will star in the commercial she auditioned for. Back at the house, Kara and Sundai are ticked off by Nicole's supposed "set-up" win. The photo shoot have the contestants pose as martial artists with the weapon of their choice. Most of the girls struggle with the harness they have to wear. At panel, Nicole, Laura, Brittany, Erin and Jennifer are praised, while Sundai is once again castigated for over-accessorizing her outfit and lacking versatility. However, the panel is worried about Brittany's and Rae's lack of presence in person and Erin's slight attitude. Ultimately Kara is eliminated within her second consecutive appearance in the bottom two for appearing to give up, while Sundai is spared and told to pull it together.: Featured photographer: Patricia Von Ah; Special guests: Neil Lane, Skyler Mattson, Rozae Nichols, Sean Patterson, Gerard Seifert, Lauren Shiohama, Jonathan Skow, Trina Turk, Jessica White, Tracy Wong, Deborah Chen; Top Model in Action: Fo Porter (cycle 12)
156	8	"Interview 101"	October 21, 2009	2.98
The contestants meet Ant and Lara Spencer from The Insider to learn interview skills. With the aim of teaching them to think on their feet, Ant makes life difficult for the models by acting out celebrity interview stereotypes. Ann Shoket arrives and informs them that they will be interviewing Jessica Lowndes as their challenge. To make things harder, their autocues are deliberately cut mid-interview. Jennifer and Erin shine with their improv, while Laura's dyslexia causes her to clam up, and Nicole struggles to ask appropriate questions. Erin wins the challenge and chooses Rae and Jennifer to share in her win – an editorial spread for Seventeen. This week's photo shoot is replaced with a commercial for CoverGirl. The contestants write their own scripts and Erin finishes quickly, while Laura and Nicole have a hard time and spend hours practicing. Again Jennifer shines, but Erin has to continually fight back tears, while Laura pushes through despite struggling with her learning difficulty. At panel, Jennifer and Nicole are praised, while Brittany delivers all of her lines flawlessly but fails to show her personality. Sundai and Laura are told they have written good scripts but castigated for their poor delivery. Ultimately Rae and Erin land in the bottom two; Erin for her incessant crying on-set, and Rae for being forgettable. But in the end despite her stellar portfolio, Rae is eliminated.: Featured commercial director: Nigel Barker; Special guests: Teyona Anderson, Ant, Jessica Lowndes, Kim Kardashian, Ann Shoket, Lara Spencer; Top Model in Action: Nicole Linkletter (cycle 5)
157	9	"Let's Go Surfing"	October 28, 2009	3.51
The contestants find their house condemned, with Tyra telling them it is too filthy to live in. However, she soon reveals that the contestants are going to Hawaii for the remainder of the competition by throwing a luau in the yard. Upon arrival, the contestants are stunned by their house and Jennifer is freaked out by the fact that her commercial is being played in at least five different rooms. The contestants are then taught how to surf by Buzzy Kerbox. After, they are given a challenge where they have to pose on a moving surfboard with a male model. Erin, Brittany and Nicole excel, while Sundai and Laura stumble. Erin is crowned the winner and, despite the rising tension between her and Brittany, picks the latter and Nicole to share a helicopter ride above Maui. While Nicole and Brittany enjoy it, Erin is upset with not winning a tangible prize yet again. At their photo shoot, the contestants are photographed by Tyra while portraying women of mixed heritage, like Hawaiian hapas. Most of the contestants struggle with the shoot, especially Laura, who is worried about her sunburns. At panel, all the contestants but Nicole get mixed reviews, with Sundai being told she photographs very short, Erin that she posed in a commercial way, and Brittany that she didn't step outside of the box. Despite Erin's second bottom two appearance in a row and her tendency to self-sabotage, it was Brittany who is sent home for being too analytical and not standing out in front of the panel.: Featured photographers: Erik Aeder (challenge), Tyra Banks (photoshoot); Special guests: Sofia Beschan, Buzzy Kerbox, Kirsty Hume; Top Model in Action: Natalie Pack (cycle 12)
158	10	"Dive Deeper"	November 4, 2009	3.87
The contestants come back from panel and Nicole is upset that she can't celebrate her first call-out because of Brittany's shocking departure. When Nicole reveals that she is impressed by Sundai's inner strength, the latter promises to tell the contestants her story if she makes it to the top four. The contestants are taught about swimsuit shoots by Marisa Miller. They are then taken to a cliff for their challenge – to jump off and look graceful on film with only one shot. Most of the contestants perform well and Nicole wins and her prize is a $5,000 chocolate pearl necklace. She also gets to pick which girls would get extra frames, and Erin is left out. Later, they celebrate Laura's 20th birthday. At the photo shoot, the contestants pose underwater and all but Erin get a second round after being critiqued by Jay. At panel, Nicole and Jennifer are praised, despite the former's lack of "Barbie toes" and the latter's lack of angles while Erin makes Top Model history by surviving three consecutive bottom two appearances, as Sundai is eliminated but comforted by Tyra who calls her a role model for orphans.: Featured photographers: Jono Knight (challenge), Russell James (photoshoot); Special guest: Marisa Miller; Top Model in Action: Fatima Siad (cycle 10)
159	11	"Hawaiian Hip Hop"	November 11, 2009	3.20
The contestants are taken to a teach about Hawaiian hula and how it can be integrated with hip hop. The contestants learn several moves and are assigned to use them to tell a story. During rehearsal, Erin uses her cheerleading experience to help the contestants get their routine down. While most of the contestants perform well, Nicole messes up her entire routine. Laura ends up winning a 5-day trip back to Hawaii after the competition is over, which she shared with Jennifer, much to Erin's frustration. At the photo shoot, the contestants are told that two of them will be eliminated at the next panel, shocking them. While Erin and Nicole perform rather well, Laura and Jennifer stumble. At panel, Laura and Nicole are praised for their pictures but Erin and Jennifer are castigated for their poor film. In the end, Laura, Jennifer and Erin land in the bottom three, Laura for not looking like a model in person and the other two for their dwindling performances. Ultimately, an overjoyed Laura joins Nicole in a Julia Clancey fashion show, while Jennifer and Erin are sent home, both of them being upset to have come so close to the win, yet so far. Laura's position marked the first time in the history of America's Next Top Model that a girl achieved a finalist status without ever receiving a first call out.: Featured photographer: Steve Shaw; Special guests: Ann Shoket, Anna Rita Sloss; Top Model in Action: Katarzyna Dolinska (cycle 10)
160	12	"America's Next Top Model is..."	November 18, 2009	3.69
The final two meet with cycle 12 winner Teyona Anderson before filming their CoverGirl LashBlast commercials and shooting their ads. Nicole was lauded for a good photo shoot, but was lambasted for a "snotty" performance in her commercial; Laura was praised for overcoming dyslexia in her commercial, but was criticized for lack of commitment in her photo shoot. The next day, Ann Shoket watched them as they shoot their potential Seventeen Magazine covers.: Featured photographers: Nigel Barker, Gilles Bensimon; Featured commercial director: Jonathan Mannion; Next, Tyra visited the final two for one-on-one conversations. It was revealed that they would be walking in a Julia Clancey fashion show together with eliminated girls Brittany, Erin, Jennifer and Sundai. At the final judging, the final two impressed the judges by their final performances, though Nicole's walk is criticized as "different" while Laura's somewhat poor commercial delivery got the thumbs down. Portfolios aside, the judges are torn between Nicole's high fashion ability and knowledge of her angles and Laura's commercial appeal and conventional beauty. The girls are called back, and Nicole is proclaimed the thirteenth winner of America's Next Top Model.: Special guests: Julia Clancey, Eddie Murphy, Bria Murphy, Teyona Anderson, Ann Shoket; Top Model in Action: Teyona Anderson (cycle 12)
161	13	"Cycle 13: Revealed"	November 18, 2009	1.80
This was the recap episode. It aired right after the finale, and featured never-before-seen footage, including Tyra doing the "queen walk" with Bianca during casting, Nicole making up nicknames for the girls in order to remember their names, a candy-eating contest between Erin, Kara and Lisa, an insight into Erin and Rae's friendship, a confrontation between Jennifer and Bianca, Jennifer cleaning the house, an insight into Nicole's passion for art, Brittany stepping on a toothpick, Kara's trivia game, Rae's tooth-brushing habit, a montage of Erin's constant crying, the final six learning the basics of scuba diving, Sundai bonding with a cat named Roger, and Nicole's naïve life-lesson from Erin and Laura including sex talk.: Top Model in Action: Danielle Evans (cycle 6)

== Summaries ==
=== Call-out order ===
Order	Episodes											
Order	1 (Note: In episode 1, the pool of 32 girls was reduced to 14. This call-out order does not reflect their performances that week.)	2 (Note: At the start of episode 2, it was revealed that Amber would not be continuing on in the competition due to personal issues. She was replaced by Lisa.)	3 (Note: In episode 3, Rachel was eliminated from the competition after performing the worst during a meeting with a Wilhelmina representative.)	4	5 (Note: In episode 5, Brittany won immunity from elimination for performing the best at the photo shoot. She also won an extra reward as a result.)	6 (Note: In episode 6, Brittany, Jennifer and Rae were called first together, as they had the best group shot.)	7	8	9	10	11 (Note: In episode 11, Erin, Jennifer and Laura were called forward as the bottom three. Tyra handed the last photo to Laura, eliminating the other two.)	12
1	Jennifer	Rae	Erin	Kara	Brittany	Brittany; Jennifer; Rae	Nicole	Jennifer	Nicole	Jennifer	Nicole	Nicole
2	Erin	Nicole	Brittany	Nicole	Jennifer	Brittany; Jennifer; Rae	Laura	Nicole	Jennifer	Nicole	Laura	Laura
3	Rachel	Jennifer	Laura	Erin	Rae	Brittany; Jennifer; Rae	Brittany	Brittany	Laura	Laura	Erin; Jennifer	
4	Kara	Ashley	Nicole	Sundai	Nicole	Laura	Erin	Sundai	Sundai	Erin	Erin; Jennifer	
5	Lulu	Courtney	Kara	Jennifer	Erin	Nicole	Jennifer	Laura	Erin	Sundai		
6	Rae	Erin	Jennifer	Bianca	Laura	Sundai	Rae	Erin	Brittany			
7	Ashley	Lulu	Sundai	Laura	Sundai	Erin	Sundai	Rae				
8	Brittany	Rachel	Rae	Ashley	Kara	Kara	Kara					
9	Bianca	Laura	Lulu	Rae	Ashley	Ashley						
10	Courtney	Kara	Ashley	Brittany	Bianca							
11	Nicole	Brittany	Bianca	Lulu								
12	Amber	Sundai	Courtney									
13	Laura	Bianca	Rachel									
14	Sundai	Lisa										

The contestant was eliminated
The contestant was immune from elimination
The contestant was eliminated outside of the judging panel
The contestant quit the competition
The contestant won the competition

=== Bottom two ===
Episode	Contestants	Eliminated
2	Bianca & Lisa	Lisa
3	Bianca & Courtney	Courtney
4	Brittany & Lulu	Lulu
5	Ashley & Bianca	Bianca
6	Ashley & Kara	Ashley
7	Kara & Sundai	Kara
8	Erin & Rae	Rae
9	Brittany & Erin	Brittany
10	Erin & Sundai	Sundai
11	Erin, Jennifer & Laura	Erin
11	Erin, Jennifer & Laura	Jennifer
12	Laura & Nicole	Laura

The contestant was eliminated after their first time in the bottom two
The contestant was eliminated after their second time in the bottom two
The contestant was eliminated after their third time in the bottom two
The contestant was eliminated after their fourth time in the bottom two
The contestant was eliminated in the final judging and placed as the runner-up

=== Photo shoot guide ===
- Episode 1 photo shoot: Runway shots/Polaroid shots (casting)
- Episode 2 photo shoot: Re-enacting baby photos
- Episode 3 photo shoot: Posing topless on a horse
- Episode 4 photo shoot: Elongating oneself
- Episode 5 photo shoot: Beauty shots with fabric
- Episode 6 photo shoot: Cirque du Soleil Mystère
- Episode 7 photo shoot: Ninja warriors
- Episode 8 commercial: CoverGirl exact eyelights collection
- Episode 9 photo shoot: Biracial Hapas
- Episode 10 photo shoot: Posing underwater
- Episode 11 photo shoot: Pele, Goddess of volcanoes
- Episode 12 photo shoots & Commercial: CoverGirl lashblast mascara & Seventeen Magazine cover

=== Makeovers ===
- Lisa – Trimmed
- Rachel – Long wavy dark brown extensions
- Courtney – Cut shorter and dyed red
- Lulu – Shoulder length black weave with bangs
- Bianca – Bleached eyebrows
- Ashley – Long, straight middle-part black weave
- Kara – Blonde highlights
- Rae – Dyed ice blonde with bleached eyebrows
- Brittany – Trimmed and dyed chocolate brown
- Sundai – Rihanna inspired cut
- Jennifer – Cut off dead ends and eyebrows shortened
- Erin – Dyed ice blonde with bleached eyebrows
- Laura – Added different colors of highlights
- Nicole – Super curly and dyed red

=== Cast Members ===
- Jay Manuel – photo shoot director

== Post-Top Model careers ==
- Lisa Ramos is signed with Basic Model Management in New York and Elite Model Management in Miami, has done some test shots and print work for a summer magazine. She's also been in Seventeen Magazine and modeled for Ideeli.com, Anjel's Hair Salon, Capture and Create Magazine, Peony Red, Me & Thee, Spring/Summer 2010, W25 Magazine (June 2010) and Supermodels Unlimited.
- Rachel Echelberger has been signed with BMG Models in New York.
- Courtney Davies is signed with Wilhelmina Models in Miami and LA. She has appeared in Glamour, Atlantic Ave Magazine, Short Hair Guide, Fashion Market Magazine, and Venue Magazine. She also appeared in the ABC family TV series Pretty Little Liars as Quinn in a recurring role for 2 episodes in 2011.
- Lulu Braithwaite has modeled for D.A.M. Magazine, Issue 12.
- Bianca Richardson is signed with Wilhelmina Models and Pink Models. She has modeled for Mallard Magazine and Betsey Johnson.
- Ashley Howard has done some modelling work but since then has gone back to her job as a dance teacher.
- Kara Vincent has taken a few test shots and has been signed to Paragon Model Management in Mexico City.
- Rae Weisz has modeled for Rochester Magazine in 2009.
- Brittany Markert is signed with Passport Model Management in San Francisco, Paragon Model Management in Mexico and has modeled for an editorial in Harper's Bazaar.
- Sundai Love is taking a few more shots, as she did some modeling work previously. She's also been on the cover of Bella Petite Magazine. She can be seen in the music video "Dirty Picture" by Taio Cruz. Sundai is currently based in Japan and works as a travel blogger.
- Erin Wagner has been signed with Wilhelmina Models and Paragon Model Management in Mexico City and has done some test shots. She can be seen in an ad for Editor's Closet for sunglasses, as well.
- Jennifer An has modeled for Knitscene Magazine and taken a few test shots. She was also a model for a skit on Late Night with Jimmy Fallon.
- Laura Kirkpatrick has been signed to Wünder Model Management and AB/FAB Management. She has received several representation offers from modeling agencies, including Tyra Banks' Bankable Productions. She has also taken part for some charity print work for 2010 Haiti earthquake relief. In 2011, she participated in America's Next Top Model, Cycle 17 with several returning models. Laura is now raising a daughter as a single mother.
- Nicole Fox is currently signed with Wilhelmina Models. She received a six-page spread in Seventeen Magazine, and an ad for Cover Girl Lash Blast Mascara. She has also modeled for Illiterate Magazine, in which she had a spread, and been featured on AOL.com, More magazine and in OK! Magazine. She was featured in Wild Fox Couture's 2010 fall collection lookbook along with models Rachel Ballinger and Daria Plyushko.
