= Fatima Siad =

Somali fashion model

Fatima Siad فاطمة سياد
- Born: December 17, 1986 (age 39); Mogadishu, Somalia
- Modeling information
- Height: 5 ft 11 in (1.80 m)
- Hair color: Black
- Eye color: Dark brown
- Agency: New Version Model Management (Hernando); Munich Models (Munich); Modellink (Stockholm)

Fatima Siad (Somali: Faadumo Siyaad, Arabic: فاطمة سياد; born December 17, 1986) is a Somali fashion model. Raised in Boston, Massachusetts, she was the last eliminated contestant on America's Next Top Model, Cycle 10.

== Biography ==
Born in Mogadishu, Somalia to Somali parents, Siad grew up in Somalia with her mother and two sisters. Her parents divorced at a young age. She underwent female genital cutting when she was seven years old. Her two sisters were killed by the Somali army during the civil war. After her sisters’ deaths, Siad and her mother fled to the United States when she was thirteen for safety. Siad states that she lived in a shack and had low self-esteem when she was younger. While in high school she participated in the Boston University Upward Bound TRIO program. She was a Posse Scholar and went to Bryn Mawr College in 2004. She transferred to New York University to study pre-med and political science. She eventually transferred back to Bryn Mawr College to finish her education.

== Career ==
=== Agency affiliation ===
Siad is currently signed with New York Model Management in New York City as well as with Munich Models in Munich, Germany. She used to be signed with IMG Models in New York City, Paris, Milan, and London, and Ace Models in Athens, Greece.

== Print work ==
She has appeared on the cover of Colures Magazine. She has been on the cover of Front Page Style the May 29, 2009 issue. Siad has appeared in editorials for American and Spanish Vogue, Elle, Australian and Indonesian Harper's Bazaar, Marie Claire, and Cosmopolitan. She has also appeared in Cosmogirl, Ebony, Essence, Women's Wear Daily, Flaunt magazine, and Look Magazine UK. She had a ten-page spread in D la Repubblica Delle Donne, issue 637. Siad has been on the covers of French magazines, The Amuser, issue two and Profil Femme, April 2009.

She has walked the runways for Giorgio Armani, Hermés, Ralph Lauren, Dries Van Noten, Max Azria, Emilia Wickstead, Moncler Gamme Rouge, J. Crew, Nanette Lepore, Alexandre Vauthier, Hervé Léger, bebe, Tracy Reese, Betsey Johnson, Anne Valérie Hash, and St. John.

In 2013, Siad had an ad campaign with Wildfox's "We're The Kids in America" Spring Collection and Doncaster's Winter 2013 Collection. In 2014, she likewise had a campaign with Jonathan Simkhai Pre-Fall 2014 collection.

She has appeared in advertising campaigns for Ralph Lauren, Marc Jacobs, Hervé Léger, Tiffany & Co., Armani Exchange, BCBG, Liz Claiborne, Tracy Reese, Express, Talbots, Neiman Marcus, Urban Decay, Aveda, Pantene, L'Oreal, Avon, Sephora, Cynthia Rowley, Clarks and Coca-Cola. Siad had a contract with the Swiss cosmetic company, Arbonne and was one of the new faces for Arbonne FC5, appearing in ads for the products. Since 2019, Fatima has been featured in the beauty brand Chantecaille advertisements.

=== Runway work ===
Siad did a presentation for Gemma Kahng at Mercedes-Benz Fashion Week Spring/Summer 2009. She also walked in the Dazzle Your Senses fashion show at Club Sol. Siad was included in NYMM's show package for fall/winter 2009 New York Fashion Week and received a showcard. She walked for Stærk, Boy by Band of Outsiders, Betsey Johnson and Michael Angel at Mercedes-Benz Fashion Week Fall/Winter 2009/2010, for Lublu K. Plastinina in Milan Fashion Week Spring/Summer 2010, and for a designer in the Project Runway Season 7 finale.

Siad walked for Dries Van Noten, Andrew Gn, Moncler Gamme Rogue and Hermès during the Spring/Summer 2012 Paris Fashion Week. Siad also walked in Armani's "One Night Only" runway show in Fall 2013. She likewise closed for designer Thierry Colson. In New York Fashion Week Spring/Summer 2014, Siad walked for Emerson by Jackie Fraser-Swan, Kaufmanfranco and Ralph Lauren. She subsequently walked for Ralph Lauren Pre-Fall. Additionally, during New York Fashion Week Fall/Winter 2014, she walked for Mara Hoffman, Sally LaPointe, Tome, Lela Rose, Dennis Basso, and did presentations for Jonathan Simkhai and J. Crew. For London Fashion Week Fall/Winter 2014, Siad also walked for Emilia Wickstead and Lucas Nascimento.

=== Television work ===
==== America's Next Top Model ====
Siad was the second (after Allison Kuehn) girl to be selected for the tenth cycle of America's Next Top Model. The judges eliminated Siad twelfth (since fellow contestant Kimberly Rydzewski quit the competition in episode two making Atalya Slater the first girl to be eliminated) in Rome during her fourth bottom two appearance which Whitney Thompson had survived for the fourth time and eventually won. Over her stay, Siad received three first call-outs and won one challenge, in which she received 50 extra frames for her photo shoot. Siad was criticized for not being able to take direction well. She was given long, chestnut brown extensions as part of her makeover. Siad missed a photo shoot, unable to get travel documents which she allegedly lost in Atlanta. That almost cost her the competition, as she landed in the bottom two along with Stacy-Ann Fequiere, but a stronger, improving portfolio saved her. Siad also survived the bottom two over Amis Jenkins and Dominique Reighard.

In one interview, Siad stated that she felt that the show was a joke and thought Claire Unabia, Lauren Utter, Katarzyna Dolinska or Anya Rozova should have won or at least not have been eliminated as early as they were. She also stated that the show may be based on politics.

Siad was the last girl featured in the Top Models in Action segment that aired during Cycle 12.

==== Other ====
Siad has appeared on the Tyra Banks Show for episodes titled Tyra's Pay It Forward with Joanie Dodds, Recessionista: Queen of Cheap where she modeled clothes with Anya Rozova and Katarzyna Dolinska America's Next Top Model Reunion for the Cycle 10 Reunion, Modelville Introduction, Modelville 2, Modelville 3, Modelville 4, and Tina Knowles modeling in a House of Dereon fashion show.

Siad starred in Modelville and she became the last eliminated in the competition.

Siad appeared briefly in the Season 1 finale of Kell on Earth (Episode "Sunny Days") as a hired model for the DKNY Cozy promo shoot.

=== Other ===
In addition, in an autobiographical essay she wrote for Orato.com titled Vulnerable Beauty: Finding My Voice, she spoke openly about female genital circumcision and her hopes for changing the practice to make it "less horrendous" for young girls.

In October 2015, Siad was ranked by Cosmopolitan as one of the most successful contestants of the Top Model franchise.
