= America's Next Top Model season 12 =

America's Next Top Model
- Season 12
- Judges: Tyra Banks; Nigel Barker; J. Alexander; Paulina Porizkova
- No. of contestants: 13
- Winner: Teyona Anderson
- No. of episodes: 13

Release
- Original network: The CW
- Original release: March 4 – May 13, 2009

Additional information
- Filming dates: October 28 – December 10, 2008

Season chronology
- ← Previous; Season 11 Next → Season 13

The twelfth cycle of America's Next Top Model premiered on March 4, 2009, and was the sixth season to air on The CW network. The cycle's catchphrase was "Get in the Fold." The cycle's promotional song was Lady Gaga's "The Fame."

== Premise ==
The prizes for this cycle were:

- A modelling contract with Elite Model Management.
- A fashion spread and cover in Seventeen.
- A US$100,000 contract with CoverGirl cosmetics.

The first half of the cycle took place in New York City; the prior Cycle was located in Los Angeles. The international destination for this cycle was São Paulo, Brazil, the show's first and only visit to South America.

The number of contestants was reduced to thirteen for the first time since Cycle 9, after being maintained at fourteen in the last two cycles. This was the last time Paulina Porizkova participated as judge.

It was the first cycle that the last contestant (Aminat Ayinde) to be eliminated has no first call-out.

The winner was 20-year-old Teyona Anderson from New Jersey, with 20-year-old Allison Harvard placing as the runner up. This season averaged 4.35 million viewers per episode.

== Contestants ==
(Ages stated are at start of contest)

Contestant	Age	Height	Hometown	Finish	Place
Isabella Falk	19	5 ft 11 in (1.80 m)	Barboursville, Virginia	Episode 2	13
Jessica Santiago	18	5 ft 10 in (1.78 m)	Bradenton, Florida	Episode 3	12
Nijah Harris	18	6 ft 0 in (1.83 m)	Rancho Cucamonga, California	Episode 4	11
Kortnie Coles	24	5 ft 11 in (1.80 m)	Houston, Texas	Episode 5	10
Sandra Nyanchoka	19	6 ft 0 in (1.83 m)	Rockville, Maryland	Episode 6	9
Tahlia Brookins	18	6 ft 0 in (1.83 m)	Phoenix, Arizona	Episode 7	8
London Levi-Nance	18	5 ft 10 in (1.78 m)	Arlington, Texas	Episode 9	7
Natalie Pack	19	6 ft 0 in (1.83 m)	Palos Verdes, California	Episode 10	6
Fo Porter	19	5 ft 8 in (1.73 m)	Albuquerque, New Mexico	Episode 11	5
Celia Ammerman	25	6 ft 0 in (1.83 m)	Cynthiana, Kentucky	Episode 12	4
Aminat Ayinde	21	6 ft 2 in (1.88 m)	Union, New Jersey	Episode 13	3
Allison Harvard	20	5 ft 10 in (1.78 m)	New Orleans, Louisiana	Episode 13	2
Teyona Anderson	20	5 ft 10 in (1.78 m)	Woodstown, New Jersey	Episode 13	1

== Episodes ==
No. overall	No. in season	Title	Original release date	US viewers (millions)
136	1	"What Happens in Vegas"	March 4, 2009	3.92
34 contestants arrived at Caesars Palace in Las Vegas, Nevada, where they were dressed up as "goddesses" and took a profile shot before showing off their walks. Later that night, Tyra arrived dressed up as the "Goddess of Fierce", and told the models that she was looking for a "successor." In interviews, London revealed that she was a street preacher, Allison admitted that she was fascinated by blood, Natalie stated that she "never had to work a day in her life", Tahlia showed her burn scars, Kortnie told the judges that Dale Earnhardt, Jr. used to be her boyfriend, Kathryn disappointed the panel for not knowing five working models, but then impressed them by citing three designers, and Monique confessed that she was a conspiracy theorist. In between interviews, Angelea Preston revealed she had a daughter who died, and that she slept in the Port Authority Bus Terminal just so she could audition. Later, a first cut was made, and 21 contestants remained, each having to portray a certain goddess. During the shoot, Sandra and Angelea bickered, greatly affecting the latter's performance. Tyra then selected the final thirteen. When Sandra was called thirteenth she bumped Angelea as an act of revenge for messing with her, disappointing and upsetting the eliminated Angelea even further. (Note: Angelea Preston would come back a year later for the fourteenth Cycle where she would successfully become an official contestant. She also competed for the third time as an All Star contestant with Allison Harvard and twelve other former participants who had not won their original Top Model Cycles on the seventeenth Cycle.): Featured photographer: Jessica Brooks
137	2	"Fun and Games"	March 4, 2009	3.92
After a trip to the rooftop of the Empire State Building, Celia won a quiz and was handed the key to their new Top Model house and was chosen to select the first bed for herself. Sandra, placing her personal belongings onto Celia's chosen bed, stirred up conflict in the house until London gave up her own bed. In addition, Isabella discussed her epilepsy when London saw the large quantity of tablets Isabella had brought with her to the competition. The contestants participated in their first fashion runway show for Abaeté into two teams of six where they had to portray either a bad contestant or a good contestant. Sandra was the last one being undecided where she has to choose either bad or good, as she chose the good contestant portrayal. Despite a good runway walk, Sandra only walked halfway on the runway, however never even realized it at all until judging. Tahlia's confidence was crushed when the designer dressed her up fully so as to cover up her scars. They later headed to Central Park for their first photoshoot where they brought well-known childhood games to life, portraying "good contestants" along with other models who portrayed "bad contestants" with the photoshoot aiming to show how contestants can grow up too quickly. In judging, London's photo received unanimously great praise, mainly because she managed to smile wide without looking cheesy and because she found her photographer while also finding her light at the same time. However, her not-so-model presence at the judging panel dragged the judges' choice down a bit. Allison (called first during the call-out ceremony), Celia, Teyona, Fo, Nijah, Kortnie and Natalie also received praise, however Aminat, Sandra, Isabella, Tahlia, and Jessica struggled to make it work. Sandra and Isabella were in the bottom two, despite being “the biggest disappointment to Miss. J.” by only walking halfway on the runway and taking a mediocre photo as she was saved from the first elimination, Isabella was the first model to eliminate in the competition despite having a strong runway walk and bubbly spirit.: Featured photographer: Fadil Berisha; Special guest: Laura Poretzky
138	3	"Do You Light The Way I Look?"	March 11, 2009	4.45
Allison was the first to have her picture displayed as digital art in the house as best photo of the previous week. Fo also stated that she really liked her photo. Aminat expressed her disappointment of Sandra surviving the first elimination over Isabella. Tyra Mail announced that it was time for makeovers. They arrived at Bergdorf Goodman where the two Jays were waiting for their makeovers; most of the contestants were pleased by their new looks, but Fo was visibly affected by the loss of her hair and her presumed femininity. Natalie panicked about getting her hair chopped off, and the stylists humoured her fear, gathering around her and talking about cutting her hair off, very short. However, when Natalie was visibly upset they dropped the charade and told her that in a Top Model first, She was not getting a makeover; she was deemed to be sufficiently model-looking the way she was. The next day, the contestants were introduced to their first reward challenge, split into four teams of three, they had to search the streets of New York for a woman that embodied the spirit of Cover Girl and act as spokesmodels for the brand, as well as help her do her makeup. Team 1 (consisting of Aminat, Sandra and Celia) won the reward of doing a photoshoot that will be displayed on Walmart, despite Sandra's limited contributions to the group. The contestants went to a bar that night and Sandra caused tension with Aminat when she joked that Aminat could get drunk. Aminat behind the scenes said, "Keep it cute or put it on mute!". The week's photoshoot required the contestants to direct their own lighting using flashing light sticks. Fo's discomfort over her makeover caused her to cry on set, disrupting the shoot. The judges were impressed by Teyona, Celia, Allison, London, and Natalie, but were disappointed with a large majority of the rest for lack of posing "tension." Despite a strong photo, Fo landed in the bottom two because the judges were concerned that she was unable to be a chameleon, however, it was Jessica who was the second contestant eliminated for being unable to translate her beauty into strong photos and for relying too much on being pretty.: Featured photographer: Nigel Barker; Special guests: Nolé Marin, John Barrett, Elyssa Starkman
139	4	"New York's Finest"	March 18, 2009	3.79
The top eleven contestants attended Miss J's Charm School to practice their runway walks. Cycle 9 contestants Bianca and Chantal were there to give advice to the contestants. Back at the house, tension arose when Natalie claimed that Tahlia's picture last week was the worst in the entire group. Teyona received a new weave after Tyra admitted in the last panel that it wasn't what she wanted. The contestants were challenged to walk for Jill Stuart, wearing her Spring Collection and carrying large shopping bags. Celia and Natalie's walks stood out, and despite making a mistake by ungracefully twirling on the runway, Natalie won the challenge and received a selection of items from the Jill Stuart collection. The photoshoot involved posing in groups as different characters including Snobs, Brokers, Nannies, Artists and Tourists in the famous Manhattan locations of Fifth Avenue, Wall Street, Upper East Side, SoHo and Times Square, respectively. Sandra impressed the judges with her stunning profile shot and received the first call-out. Celia, Aminat, Fo, Tahlia, London and Kortnie also impressed the judges having their photos being their best so far. Natalie and Teyona survived the bottom two. In the end, Allison, having disappointed the judges by over-analyzing her shot, landed in the bottom two with Nijah, whom the judges felt she was relying too much on being beautiful to get by in the competition. However, the judges felt Allison had more to give, and Nijah was the third contestant eliminated.: Featured photographer: Mike Rosenthal; Special guests: Jill Stuart, Ann Shoket, Bianca Golden, Chantal Jones; Top Model in Action: Bianca Golden (cycle 9)
140	5	"Put Your Best Face Forward"	March 25, 2009	2.87
Toccara Jones of Cycle 3 visited the contestants for a slumber party, and taught them about making an impression with personality. The next day, the models were taught by Benny Ninja how to strike various poses with different genres of music. Most of the contestants struggled at the teach, but Natalie and Celia stood out due to their creativity. Later that night the contestants were challenged to a pose-off competition, where groups of contestants faced off against each other and were judged based on the overall audience response to their individual performances. Celia and Natalie made it to the final round, however, Celia won the challenge and chose Allison to share the prize. Tahlia's confidence was once again shattered because of the audience's negative reaction during her performance, and she considered quitting the competition. This sparked a series of reactions from some of the contestants, especially Celia, who were shocked that she might move on instead of someone who wanted to win more than her. The week's photoshoot had the contestants portray old immigrants that traveled to Ellis Island with their families; Benny Ninja was pictured with the contestants as the family father. The pictures were taken via old-fashioned cameras and were thus black-and-white. Tahlia once again expressed her desire to quit in the make-up room, however at panel, her improvement impressed the judges and she received the first call-out. Teyona, Natalie, and Allison also received unanimous praise for their convincing performances conveyed on film. London, Aminat, Celia and Fo were also safe from elimination while Sandra and Kortnie landed in the bottom two. Despite Sandra's poor performance in the challenge and continual reliance on being beautiful and using profile shots to coast through the competition, was yet again saved from elimination for her determination to win. Right after Sandra was congratulated for making it to the top nine, Celia went up to stand by Kortnie and told Tyra that "Tahlia did express that she did not want to be in this competition anymore and that she felt that this was not a wise career pathway option", and that she found it unfair to send home other contestants with more passion while Tahlia, who did not even want to be there, continued to remain in the competition. However, Celia was rebutted by Tyra who said that what Celia was doing is unfair and that Tahlia should be the only person to express her own feelings. The judges' decision was final and couldn't be further altered. After Celia was asked to rejoin the other eight contestants, Kortnie was still getting eliminated for not having the most striking portfolio despite her first photoshoot and being striking contestant in person and proving to Tyra that she can give a fierce look.: Featured photographer: Brian Edwards; Special guests: Benny Ninja, David Blond, Phillipe Blond, Sky Nellor, Toccara Jones; Top Model in Action: April Wilkner (cycle 2)
141	6	"Here's Your Test"	April 1, 2009	3.97
Celia's actions from the previous week's judging panel after Sandra survived the bottom two over Kortnie who was eliminated fourth continued to rock the house. After Sandra told Aminat, Teyona and Tahlia that Celia, Allison and Natalie were talking about Tahlia behind her back, there was a fight in the kitchen. Teyona asked Celia if she had "felt like fool" and Aminat also called Natalie "stupid" after Natalie told Tahlia that is a competition and that she and the other girls would try to send Tahlia home if this was not a career pathway for her. The contestants' challenge was to pose using face cut-outs in famous photos of Tyra Banks. Celia was criticised for focusing too much on her body, while London and Natalie excelled. Natalie was ultimately chosen as the winner, and she received 50% more frames at the next photo shoot as her prize. Back at the house later, Tahlia and Celia discussed the previous elimination, with Tahlia expressing her humiliation and disappointment in Celia's behavior. Celia said she did not regret saying whatever she said, however said humiliating Tahlia was not her intention and apologized, saying she felt sure she would be eliminated at panel. This week's photo shoot saw the girls taking beauty shots using different colored powders. At panel, the judges were impressed by Fo and Teyona's photos. Tahlia and Aminat also received positive feedback. Allison received a reprimand from panel for relying on one look in all of her photos and London, Natalie and Sandra were criticized for their lackluster photos. Despite taking amazing profile photos during this week's shoot, Nigel Barker insisted that a straight-on shot for Sandra was selected as all her previous photos were not straight on. Celia was praised for embodying her color and for strong personal style, however, the judges were disappointed about her controversial actions last panel after the call-out ceremony and before Kortnie had been dismissed. Ultimately Sandra and Celia landed in the bottom two; Sandra for being unable to take a strong front facial shot, and Celia for her "non-beautiful" doings last week. In the end, Celia's strong photos and personal style saved her from elimination, however she was warned to learn her lesson and not to "mess with another contestant's money." Sandra was eliminated in her third bottom two appearance, despite taking beautiful photos and having a strong modeling desire and potential.: Featured photographer: Keith Major; Special guests: Beth Stern; Top Model in Action: Whitney Thompson (cycle 10)
142	7	"Acting Like a Model"	April 8, 2009	3.69
The contestants were taught acting skills by Paulina, which led them to act out a scene with Clay Aiken. Celia and London excelled, while Allison and Tahlia were criticized for holding back too much. London won the challenge, and US$5,000 worth of clothing. However, she gave most of her prizes away as she felt she had gained weight and would not be able to fit in the clothes. Instead of a photoshoot, the contestants had a Cover Girl commercial with the aid of a teleprompter as they were split into two teams of four. At panel, all of the contestants received criticism. Celia was praised again for her strong fashion sense although it was pointed out how much older she looked. Teyona was told she was not telegenic. Allison 's commercial was criticized, both for her one-note expressions and delivery. On the side, Teyona was ordered to swap clothes with Allison, as she was wearing an outfit that she had worn before. Aminat was criticized for clipping words and London was told her performance was lazy. The judges additionally commented on London's weight gain during deliberation. Natalie was told she looked good on film, but was forgettable; Fo stuttered through her commercial and was told that she performed better in the background of other commercials. Similar criticism was also given to London. Tahlia struggled, with the judges commenting that she looked older than her years. Ultimately, Celia redeemed herself from the last two weeks and received the first call-out for standing out in the batch of weak commercials. Allison and Tahlia landed in the bottom two, with Allison being told she was not versatile, and Tahlia that her low self-esteem held her back. With that, Allison was saved for the second time and Tahlia was eliminated in her only ever bottom two appearance.: Featured commercial director: Peter Chelkowski; Special guests: Clay Aiken, McKey Sullivan, Elyssa Starkman; Top Model in Action: Heather Kuzmich (cycle 9)
143	8	"Cycle 12 Rewind"	April 8, 2009	1.86
This is the recap episode of cycle 12 that also features unaired clips from previous episodes. Such as an insight into Allison and Celia's friendship, Kortnie, Allison and Celia making a birdhouse, Celia gave her breakdown of the contestants at casting, Allison having drawings (including a nose-bleeding Tyra), Celia imagining a montage of "sleeping Natalie" and Kortnie, Allison and Celia having a crying competition however Fo's incessant crying outshined all three girls. Sandra was also featured a lot in a number of clips. She considered Angelea as tough competition, repeated reiterated the fact that she was there to become America's Next Top Model, wanting to have Nijah eliminated, getting told she's not liked by Jessica, feeling misunderstood by the other contestants, disapproving of Aminat and Teyona stripping on the runway, broke down during Toccara's visit of her being picked on when she was younger, reacting to Celia's judging disruptions of Tahlia not wanting to compete during Kortnie's elimination in front of Allison, Celia, London and Natalie, shouting at Allison in the same scene for not listening to her then letting Celia know that Sandra thinks she acts so immature for a 25-year-old.: Top Model in Action: Claire Unabia (cycle 10)
144	9	"Take Me to the Photo Shoot"	April 15, 2009	3.78
The week's reward challenge had the contestants become the creative directors of their competitors' photo shoots as they take pictures for a Southpole Junior advert. Allison impressed Jay with her bubbly personality for the first time, while Aminat's laid back attitude infuriated him as she used too much time on wardrobe and only had four minutes to get Natalie on set. Celia gave good direction but selected a picture where Fo's shoes were cropped out. Teyona's creativity amazed Jay and she was chosen as the winner, and got the opportunity to appear in the June issue of Seventeen magazine, which she shared with Aminat and Celia. The next morning, Jay visited the contestants at their own house and brought in the entire Tyra Banks "glam squad (occasionally featured in some of Tyra's talk show episodes)." R&B superstar Ciara arrived at this week's photo shoot, and the contestants had to portray crazed fans of the star tangled up in wires. While Teyona, Fo and Natalie excelled in the shoot, Aminat and Allison struggled to deliver a shot. London's weight gain was too obvious to be ignored, and Jay discussed it with her after her photo shoot, telling her that while she was way too small for plus-size modeling she should watch her eating habits to continue to fit in sample sizes. A male model appeared at the beginning of panel speaking Portuguese and presented Tyra with a bowl of Brazil nuts, leading her to tell the contestants that the six contestants to survive elimination would be going to São Paulo, Brazil for the rest of the competition. Teyona received the first call out while Aminat and London ended up in the bottom two, each for the first time ever; Aminat for her bland shot and dead facial expression, and London for not using her conventional beauty well in her photo and for her recent weight gain. In the end, London was eliminated.: Featured photographers: James Wade, Mike Ruiz; Special guests: Ann Shoket, Ciara; Top Model in Action: Bre Scullark (cycle 5)
145	10	"The Amazing Model Race"	April 22, 2009	4.01
Upon arrival in São Paulo, Brazil, the top six contestants were greeted by Brazil's Next Top Model host Fernanda Motta and raced in pairs to deliver flowers to Helô Pinheiro. Natalie and Fo were the first to arrive and they received US$500 pairs of jeweled Havaianas flip flops as well as the keys to their new home. The following day, the contestants learned the martial art of Capoeira and Celia accidentally kicked Aminat in the face during practice. They were then challenged to perform while attempting to produce a good photograph. Most contestants struggled, such as Celia who repeatedly blocked her face, Teyona who did capoeira more than she modeled, and Natalie who didn't push through. Fo's photo was chosen as the best, granting her 50% more frames during the next photo shoot while another contestant of her choice would lose 50%. Fo, still annoyed that Teyona did not choose her to share in her reward during the previous episode, chose Teyona to lose half of her frames. Back at the house Fo and Teyona had a fight due to Teyona losing half her frames with Fo saying the "now the feeling of what its like is known and its a taste of one's own medicine". For the week's photo shoot, the models embodied Brazilian icon Carmen Miranda. Allison surprised Jay with her creativity and Teyona did an incredible job, even though she only had 25 shots. On the other hand, Fo failed to deliver a shot with Jay pointing out that Fo was interpreting the Brazilian icon so greatly that she lost her model sense. At panel, Allison's photo received universal praise for her successful embodiment of the icon and Teyona was told she looked like a model but not much like Carmen. Teyona's wardrobe at panel was also criticize, while Celia's photo was chastised for not looking fresh. In the end, Natalie was dropped for the first time ever to the bottom two, for consistently delivering only moderate pictures, along with Aminat for her lack of expressions in her photos. Shockingly, Natalie was eliminated in her only ever bottom two appearance despite a better picture, and Aminat was saved from elimination for the second consecutive time.: Featured photographers: Paschoal Rodriguez, Daniel Klajmic; Special guests: Fernanda Motta, Helô Pinheiro; Top Model in Action: Eva Pigford (cycle 3)
146	11	"Let's Go See the City"	April 29, 2009	4.01
The contestants met Paulo Borges (the director of São Paulo Fashion Week) and Fabienne Muzy (the translator) before being sent out on go-sees throughout the city of São Paulo where five designers awaited them. Despite a high fashion portfolio, Allison's runway walk was criticized. Aminat's walk was heralded as great whilst Teyona was praised for her face and personality. Fo managed to see all five designers but was chastised heavily for her height and looking too commercial. Celia's age did not sit well with one designer, but compensated for her graceful, elegance walk and sense of style. After all five contestants were in the room, Vanessa Da Silveira (Paulo Borges assistant) came in to announce that "Mr. Borges will not be able to be here, but he asked Vanessa to bring the contestants back to São Paulo Fashion Week headquarters". The contestants were taken to the rooftop and as "time is of the essence" they were going to fly by helicopter to meet Paulo Borges. On the rooftop, Vanessa shouted at Celia and Fo for being late from their go-sees (Celia by only one minute and Fo by twelve minutes) and both of them were disqualified from the challenge. Furthermore, they were also sent downstairs to collect a taxi. Allison, Aminat and Teyona followed Vanessa into the helicopter on their journey to meet Paulo Borges and Fabienne Muzy back at the fashion week headquarters where Teyona won the challenge as she was booked by all three of her go-sees, and won clothes from each designer. For this week's photo shoot, the contestants had to pose in small, high fashion swimsuits while standing out on a crowded beach of locals and tourists in Santos. Allison was unanimously praised for being able to connect with her surroundings whilst Teyona was noted for being able to understand her angles. Aminat failed to use the potential in her body with her shot coming out stiff, whilst Fo's shot made her look even shorter. Celia, despite again lauded for her strong personal style, was lambasted for being overly-rehearsed during her shoot. Celia and Fo landed in the bottom two for the second time each as they had something "that the modeling industry looks at as not being right". Celia for starting out at 25 years old, thinking too much beforehand and delivering an unsatisfactory photo, and Fo for looking even shorter in her photos and booking none of her go sees. In the end, Celia's previous strong shots and personal style won the judges over, and Fo was eliminated.: Featured photographer: Nigel Barker; Special guests: Paulo Borges, Fabienne Muzy, Adriana Degreas, Caio Campos, Clo Orozco, Cris Barros, Oskar Metsavaht, Adriana Bozon, Vanessa Da Silveira, Adrianne Curry; Top Model in Action: Samantha Potter (cycle 11)
147	12	"Take Me to the Jungle"	May 6, 2009	3.82
The contestants arrived at Águia de Ouro and met Paulina where they learned the steps in samba dance. The next day, they were put to the test and had to create an illusion of having a good time through the dance they learned. Celia managed to relax her face and delivered a convincing performance, winning her jewelry from Ara Vartanian worth over US$7,000, which she shared with Allison. For the week's photo shoot, the contestants traveled to the Brazilian jungle where they were dressed as exotic birds sitting in their nests, with Tyra herself as the photographer. Allison's composure on set got praise and Celia was lauded for looking fresh and being creative. On the other hand, Aminat's inability to use her face to catch the light impeded her performance while Teyona struggled against various elements (rain & darkness) during her photo shoot, causing Tyra to have difficulty in shooting her as well. At panel, Allison's photo earned her a first call-out as it was unanimously and greatly praised from the judges. The rest of the contestants were also praised for the photos as well. After Teyona's name was called second, Celia and Aminat appeared in the bottom two for the third time each. Although Celia was deemed to have a better portfolio, the judges were concerned that her face may be "too mature for the modeling industry". While Aminat was again saved for the third time, Celia was the tenth contestant eliminated.: Featured photographer: Tyra Banks; Special guests: Juliana Leite, Eduardo Ramos, Ara Vartanian, Ann Shoket; Top Model in Action: Yaya DaCosta (cycle 3)
148	13	"America's Next Top Model is..."	May 13, 2009	4.31
The top three contestants shot their CoverGirl commercials. Aminat was criticized for her lack of facial expression on film but her overall commercial was deemed the best by panel. Allison forgot her lines but managed to deliver a convincing commercial, while Teyona's nerves took their toll on her as she fumbled through her lines. Afterward, the contestants shot their CoverGirl print ad. Allison was called first for her ability to capture her beauty in a photo due to her stunning picture, despite her average but believable commercial. Aminat's inability to photograph with facial variety disappointed the judges once more, though her commercial was the strongest of the three. Teyona's photo granted her praise once again because she managed to appear sultry and maintain commercial appeal, but she was lambasted for her uninspiring performance in her CoverGirl commercial. Aminat's inconsistent portfolio and Teyona's dismal commercial landed then in the bottom two. However the judges deemed Teyona's portfolio was stronger, thus eliminating Aminat in her fourth bottom two appearance.: Featured photographer: Jim De Yonker; Featured commercial director: Jay Manuel; The final two shot their Seventeen magazine cover tries where they both excelled and impressed Ann Shoket. Later, for their final performance, Allison and Teyona arrived at Ibirapuera Auditorium for competed in a Rosa Chá swimsuit fashion show where they had to strut a sultry walk, dance in samba movement and crawl provocatively at the end of the show. Cycle 11 winner McKey Sullivan joined the final two for the show. At panel, Allison was commended for her significant improvements throughout the competition as well as for her strong walk, which also improved immensely from being the worst of the bunch. Teyona's walk was criticized for looking somewhat robotic, though she was still praised for her stellar photos. The judges felt that the final two had their own strengths; Teyona was lauded for her versatile portfolio that translated into booking ability, creativity during photo shoots, and genuine personality while Allison's high fashion and editorial look could book her international fashion shows. Teyona won and named America's Next Top Model.: Featured photographer: Nigel Barker; Special guests: Amir Slama, McKey Sullivan, Maíra Vieira, Fernanda Motta, Ann Shoket; Top Model in Action: Fatima Siad (cycle 10)

== Summaries ==
=== Call-out order ===
Order	Episodes												
Order	1 (Note: In episode 1, the pool of 34 girls was reduced to 13. This call-out order does not reflect their performances that week.)	2	3	4	5	6	7	9	10	11	12	13	
1	Aminat	Allison	Teyona	Sandra	Tahlia	Fo	Celia	Teyona	Allison	Teyona	Allison	Allison	Teyona
2	Natalie	Fo	Celia	Aminat	Teyona	Teyona	Natalie	Fo	Teyona	Allison	Teyona	Teyona	Allison
3	Fo	Teyona	Allison	Tahlia	Allison	Tahlia	Teyona	Natalie	Fo	Aminat	Aminat	Aminat	
4	Allison	London	Natalie	Fo	Natalie	Aminat	Fo	Celia	Celia	Celia	Celia		
5	Tahlia	Celia	London	Celia	London	Allison	London	Allison	Aminat	Fo			
6	Celia	Nijah	Nijah	Kortnie	Aminat	Natalie	Aminat	Aminat	Natalie				
7	Nijah	Kortnie	Tahlia	London	Celia	London	Allison	London					
8	London	Natalie	Sandra	Teyona	Fo	Celia	Tahlia						
9	Teyona	Aminat	Kortnie	Natalie	Sandra	Sandra							
10	Kortnie	Tahlia	Aminat	Allison	Kortnie								
11	Isabella	Jessica	Fo	Nijah									
12	Jessica	Sandra	Jessica										
13	Sandra	Isabella											

The contestant was eliminated
The contestant won the competition

=== Bottom two ===
Episode	Contestants	Eliminated
2	Isabella & Sandra	Isabella
3	Fo & Jessica	Jessica
4	Allison & Nijah	Nijah
5	Kortnie & Sandra	Kortnie
6	Celia & Sandra	Sandra
7	Allison & Tahlia	Tahlia
9	Aminat & London	London
10	Aminat & Natalie	Natalie
11	Celia & Fo	Fo
12	Aminat & Celia	Celia
13	Aminat & Teyona	Aminat
13	Allison & Teyona	Allison

The contestant was eliminated after their first time in the bottom two
The contestant was eliminated after their second time in the bottom two
The contestant was eliminated after their third time in the bottom two
The contestant was eliminated after their fourth time in the bottom two
The contestant was eliminated in the final judging and placed as the runner-up

=== Photo shoot guide ===
- Episode 1 photo shoot (casting): Goddess profile/type of goddess
- Episode 2 photo shoot: Childhood games
- Episode 3 photo shoot: Lighting oneself in a warehouse
- Episode 4 photo shoot: Couture New York City sight-seeing in pairs
- Episode 5 photo shoot: Ellis Island immigrants
- Episode 6 photo shoot: Beauty shots evoking different colors
- Episode 7 Commercial: CoverGirl micro mineral foundation
- Episode 9 photo shoot: Crazed Ciara fans tangled in wires
- Episode 10 photo shoot: Embodying Carmen Miranda on a Favela
- Episode 11 photo shoot: Swimsuits on a tourist beach
- Episode 12 photo shoot: Exotic birds
- Episode 13 photo shoot & Commercial: CoverGirl outlast lipstain print ad and commercial & Seventeen Magazine covers

=== Makeovers ===
- Jessica - Cut to shoulder-length with dark red highlights
- Nijah - Long black weave
- Kortnie - Trimmed and dyed red
- Sandra - Buzz cut and dyed blonde
- Tahlia - Shoulder-length golden blonde weave
- London - Agyness Deyn inspired cut and dyed platinum blonde
- Natalie - No makeover
- Fo - Pixie cut with short bangs
- Celia - Cut short and dyed platinum blonde
- Aminat - Naomi Campbell inspired long wavy black weave
- Allison - Long wavy blonde extensions and eyebrows lightened
- Teyona - Long slicked-back jheri curl black weave; later, Beverly Peele inspired long curly black weave
