= List of America's Next Top Model contestants =

This is a list of contestants who have appeared on the American television show America's Next Top Model. Hosted by model Tyra Banks and her panel of judges, a number of aspiring models compete to win a modeling contract with a top modeling agency, a cover and/or spread in a fashion magazine, and a cosmetics campaign. The series first aired in 2003 and as of 2018, twenty-four cycles have aired. A total of 311 different participants have been selected as finalists in the show in its fifteen years running, with twenty-four models (Adrianne Curry, Yoanna House, Eva Pigford, Naima Mora, Nicole Linkletter, Danielle Evans, CariDee English, Jaslene Gonzalez, Saleisha Stowers, Whitney Thompson, McKey Sullivan, Teyona Anderson, Nicole Fox, Krista White, Ann Ward, Brittani Kline, Lisa D'Amato, Sophie Sumner, Laura James, Jourdan Miller, Keith Carlos, Nyle DiMarco, India Gants, and Kyla Coleman) crowned "America's Next Top Model".

Contestants usually apply to be on the show through video-auditioning, or attend casting calls, but the series has been known to recruit contestants from a myriad of various methods. Cycle 9 winner Saleisha Stowers and cycle 11 second runner-up Analeigh Tipton were recruited via MySpace. Isis King from cycle 11 was recruited after appearing as an extra from cycle 10's homeless photo shoot, while cycle 6 contestant Sara Albert was scouted at a mall. Cycle 13's Ashley Howard was also scouted at The Tyra Banks Show, while cycle 15 contestants Jane Randall and Kendal Brown were scouted through a photo challenge on Tyra Banks' website. Cycle 20 contestant Mike Scocozza was scouted while working in an ice cream truck. In more recent years of the show, the production team has taken to scouting for contestants on various social media platforms, like Instagram.

== Contestants ==
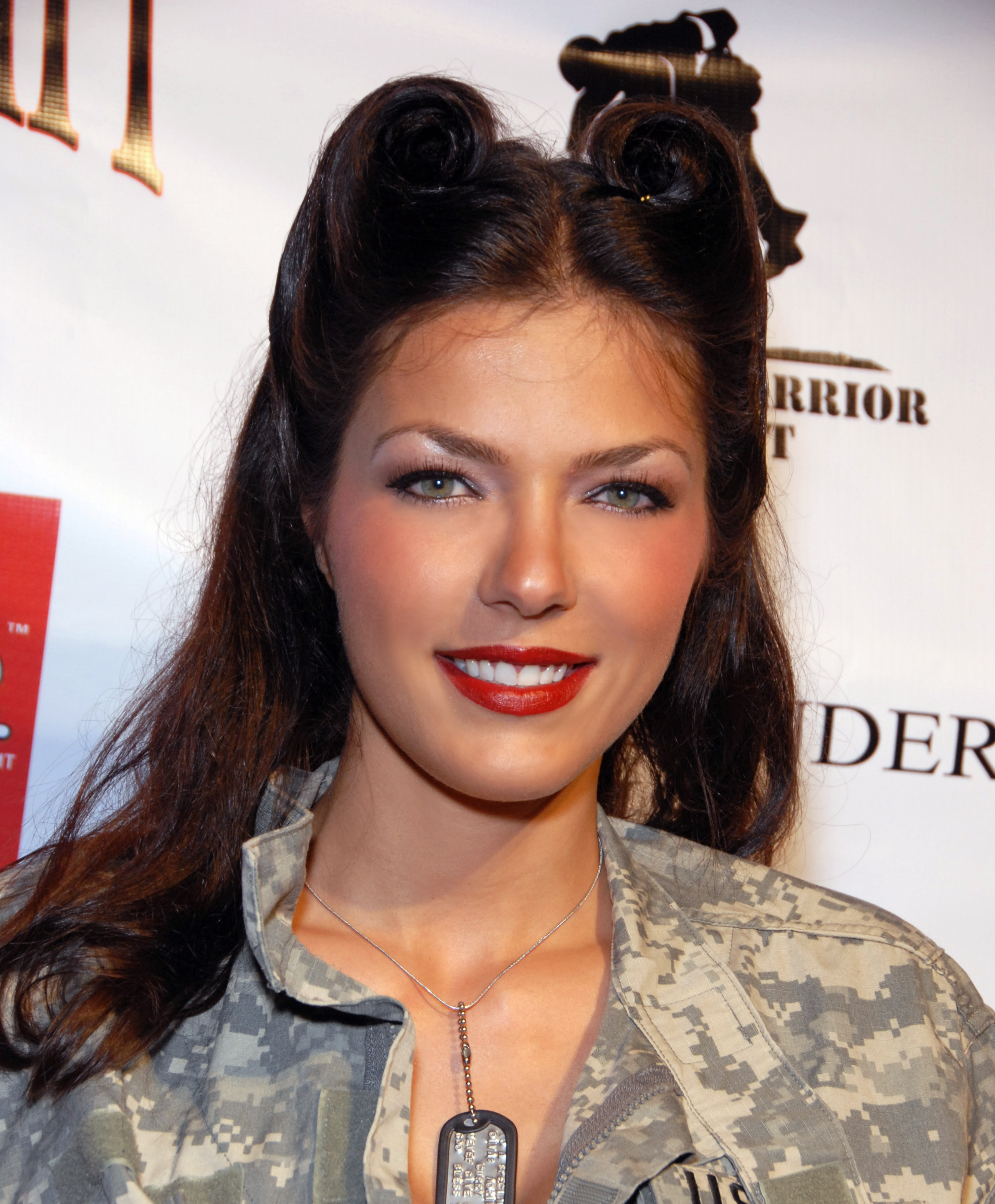
Adrianne Curry, winner of ANTM, cycle 1

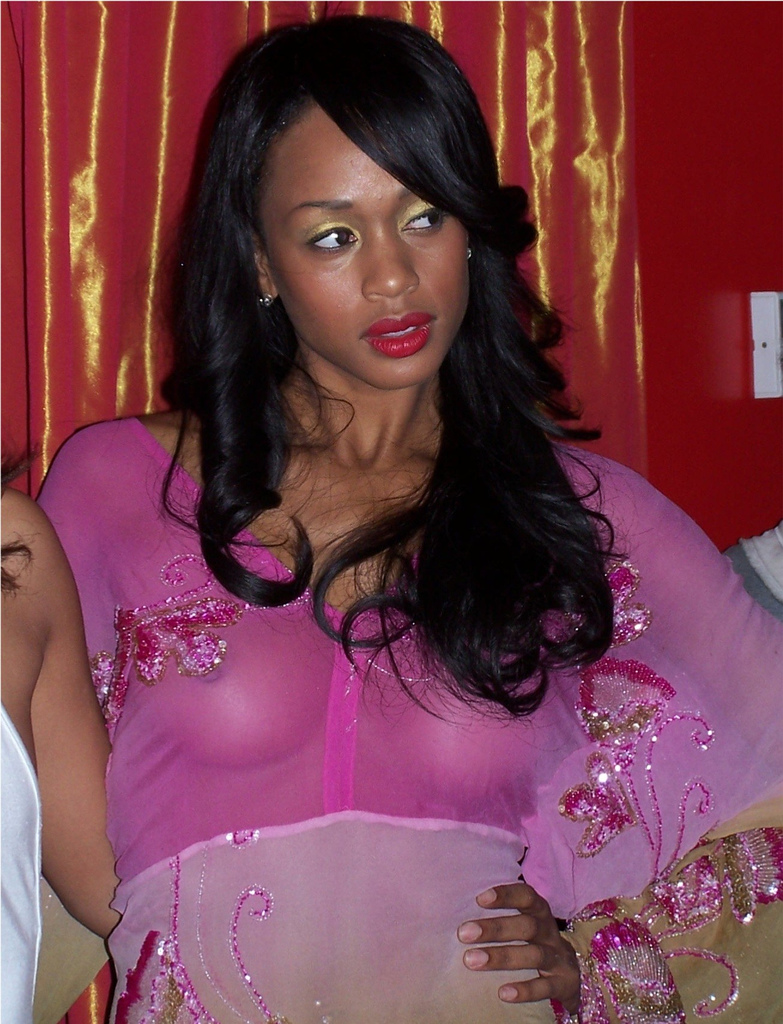
Camille McDonald, ANTM, cycle 2 and Cycle 17

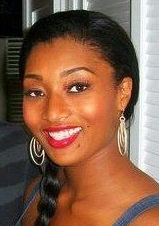
Toccara Jones, ANTM, cycle 3

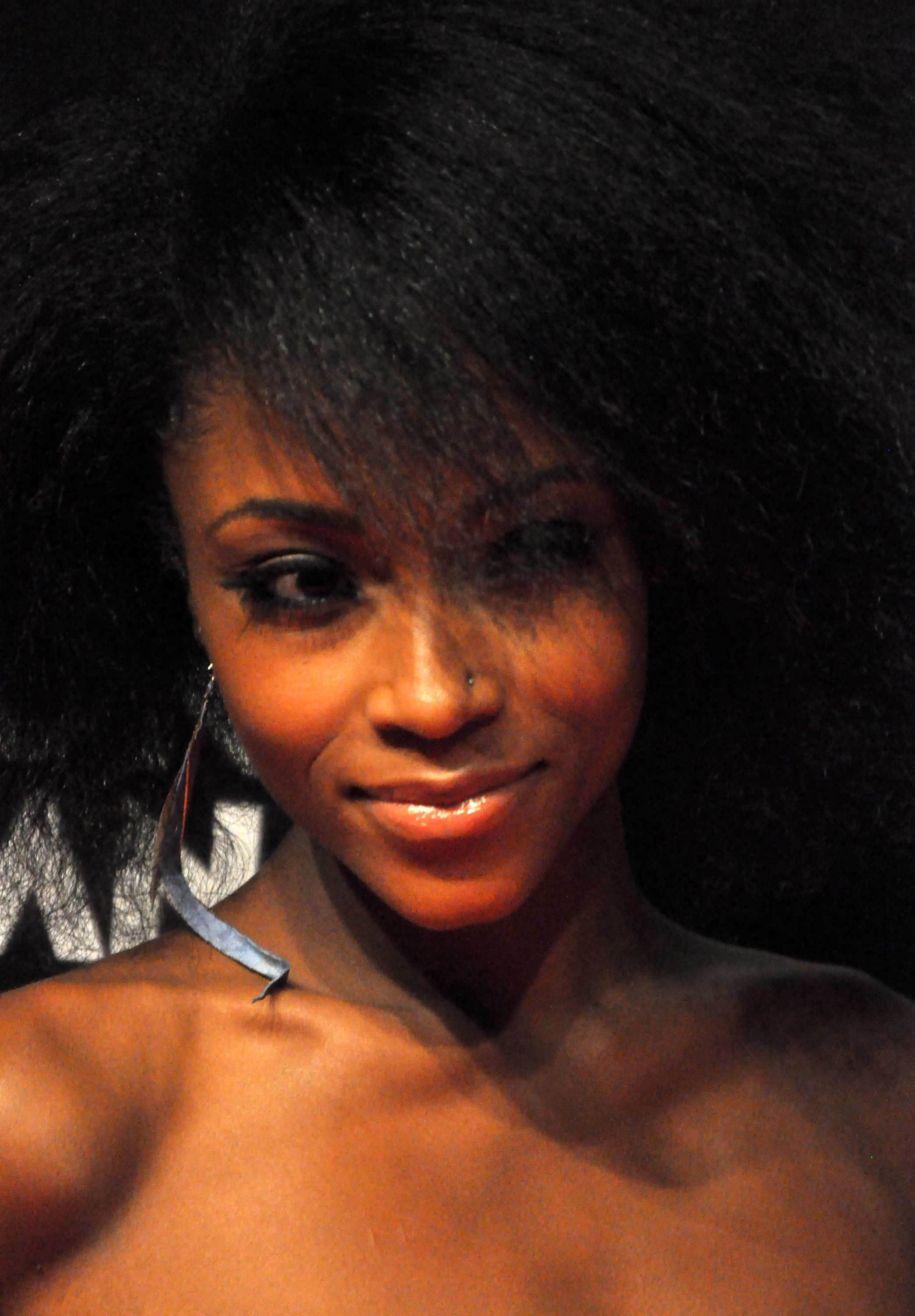
Yaya DaCosta, ANTM, cycle 3

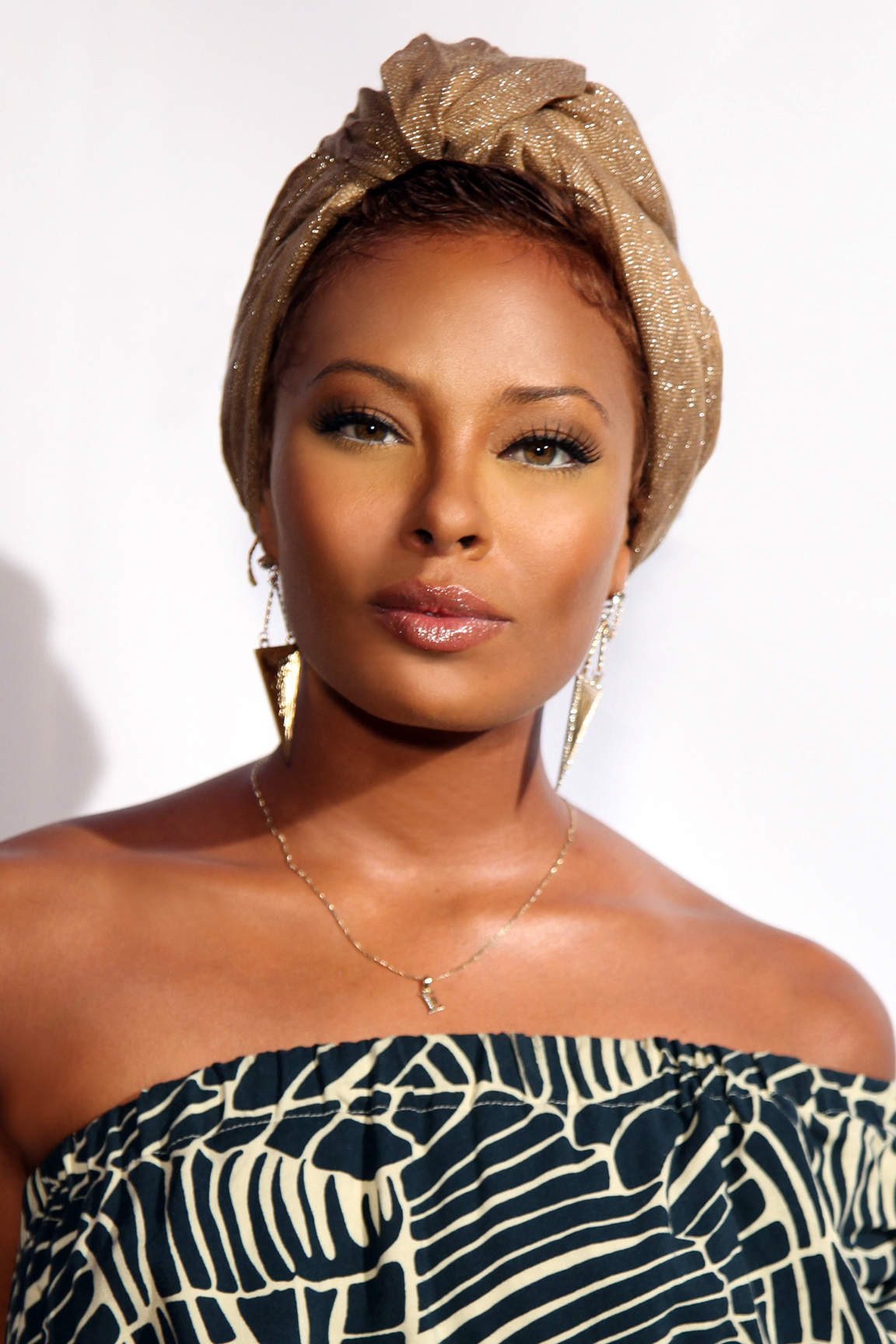
Eva Marcille, winner of ANTM, cycle 3

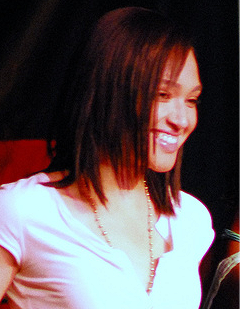
Naima Mora, winner of ANTM, cycle 4

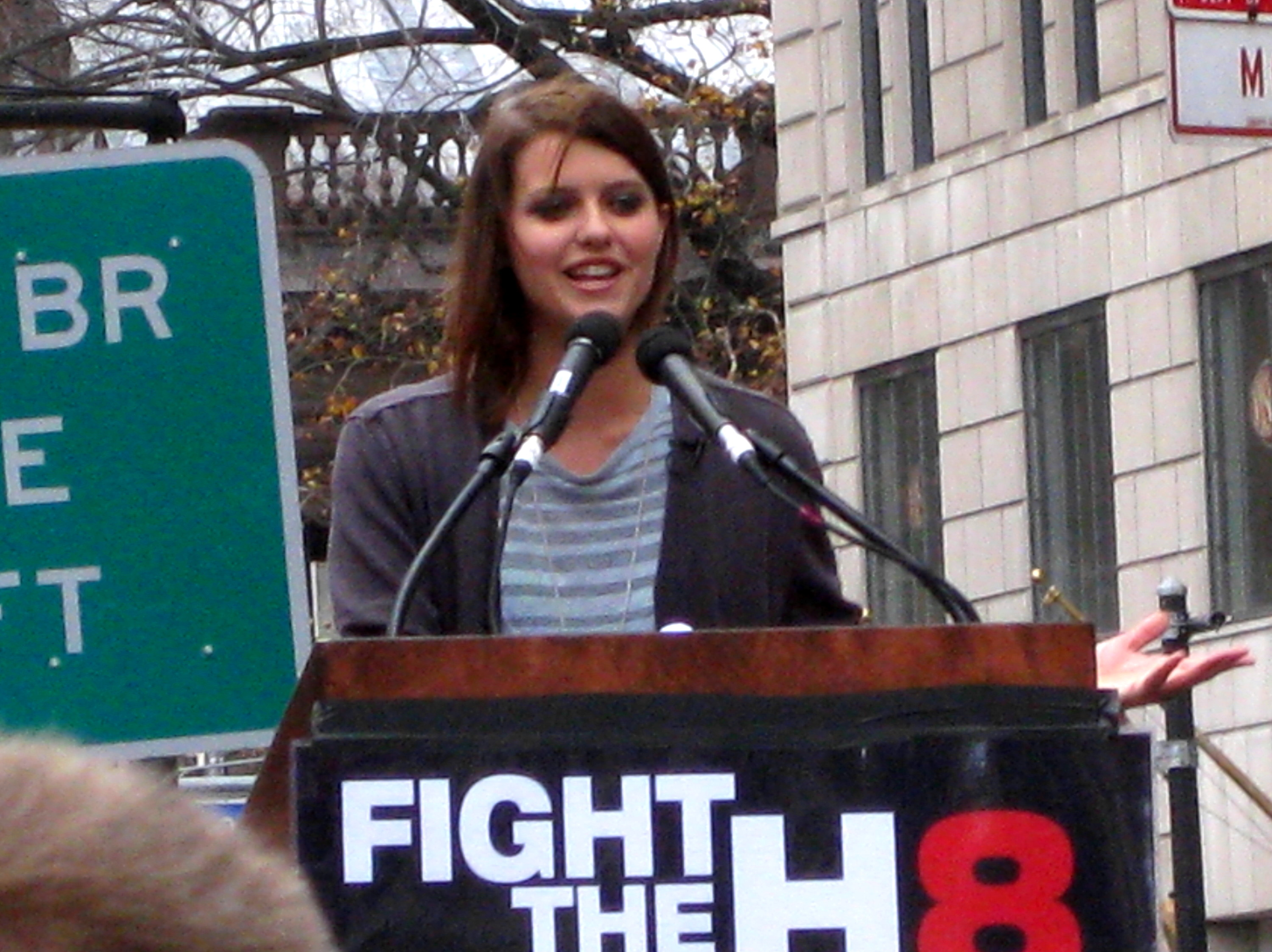
Kim Stolz, ANTM, cycle 5

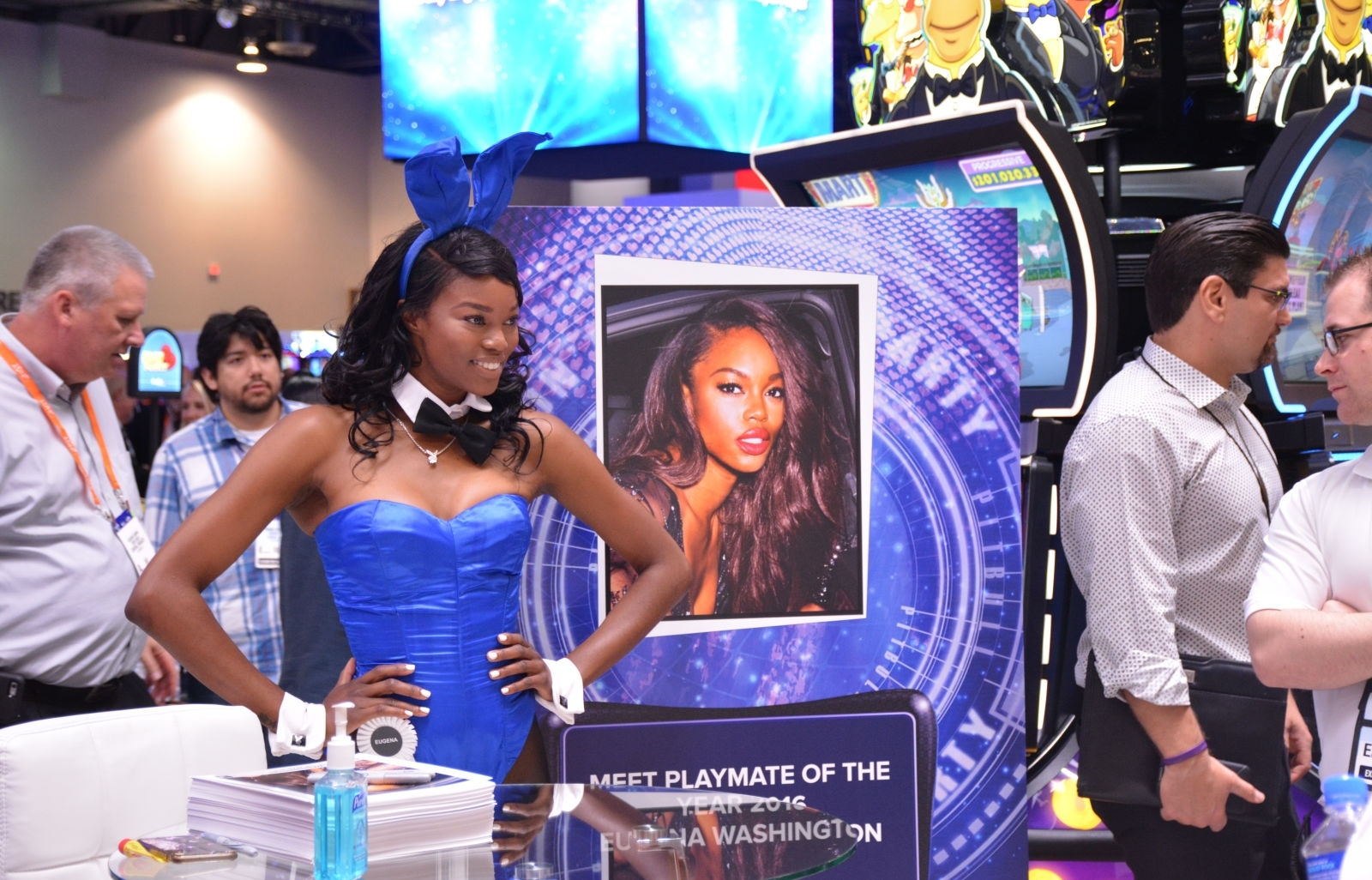
Eugena Washington, ANTM, cycle 7

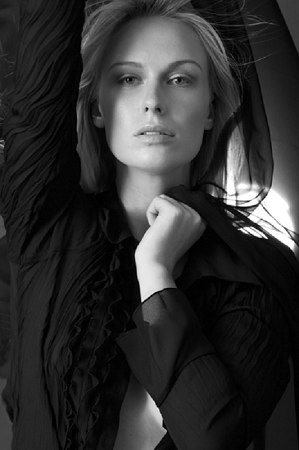
CariDee English, winner of ANTM, cycle 7

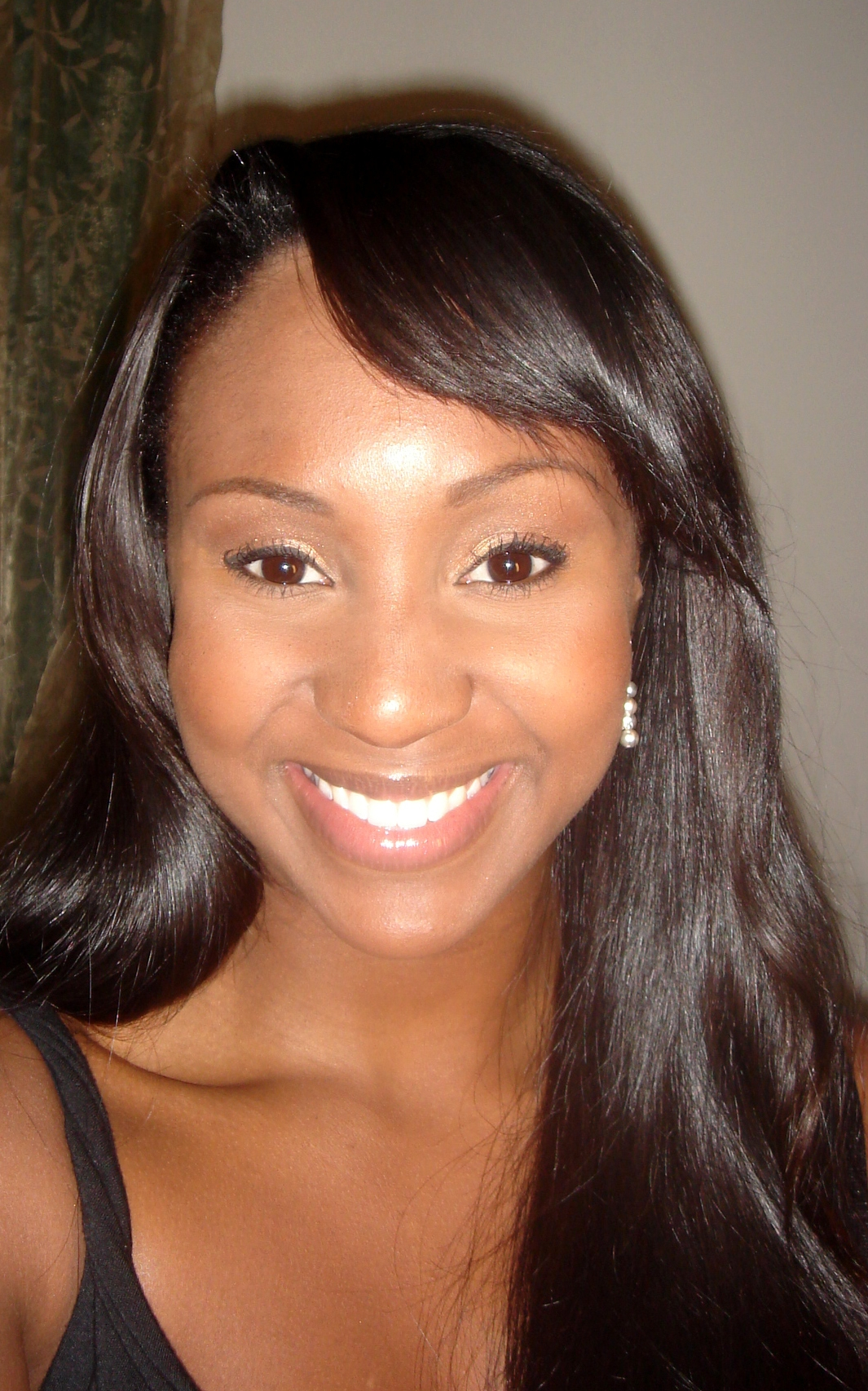
Whitney Cunningham, ANTM, cycle 8

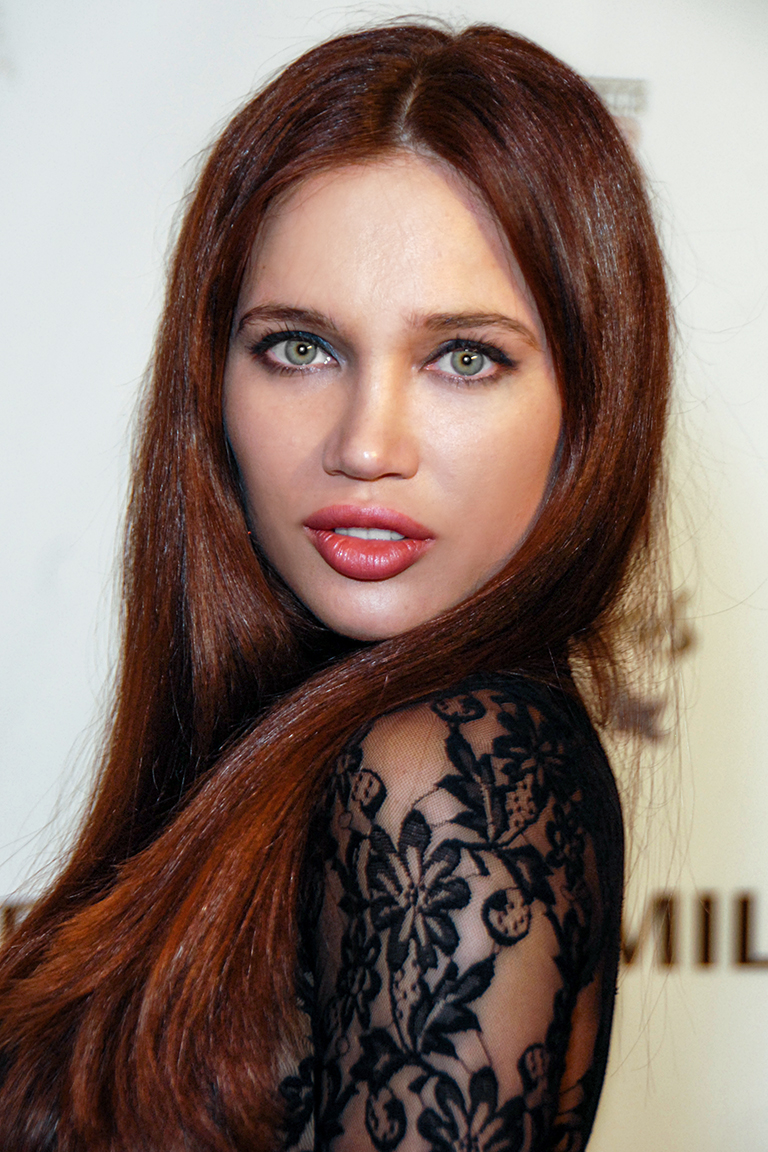
Natasha Galkina, ANTM, cycle 8

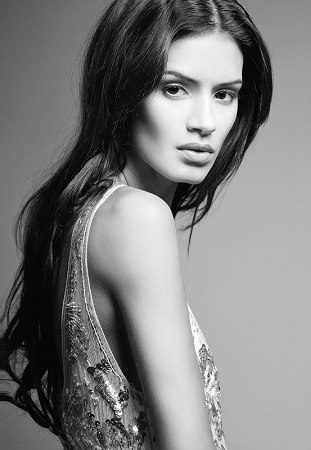
Jaslene Gonzalez, winner of ANTM, cycle 8

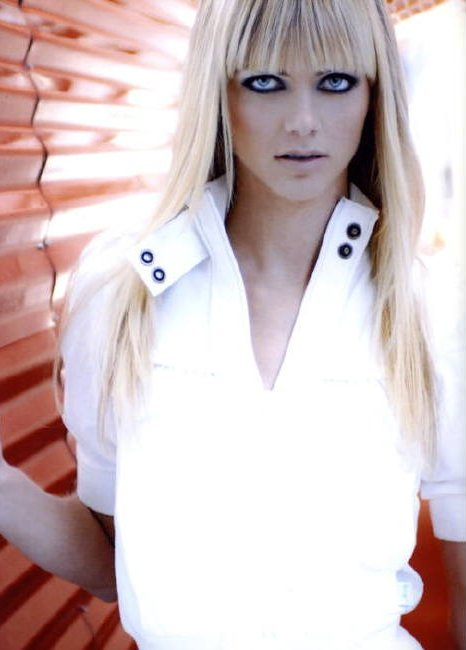
Chantal Jones, ANTM, cycle 9

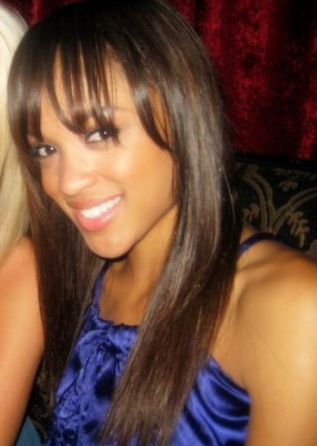
Saleisha Stowers, winner of ANTM, cycle 9

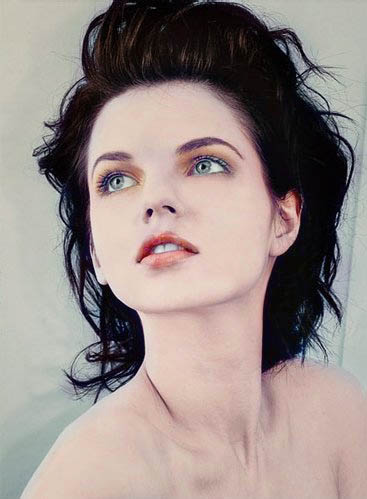
Katarzyna Dolinska, ANTM, cycle 10

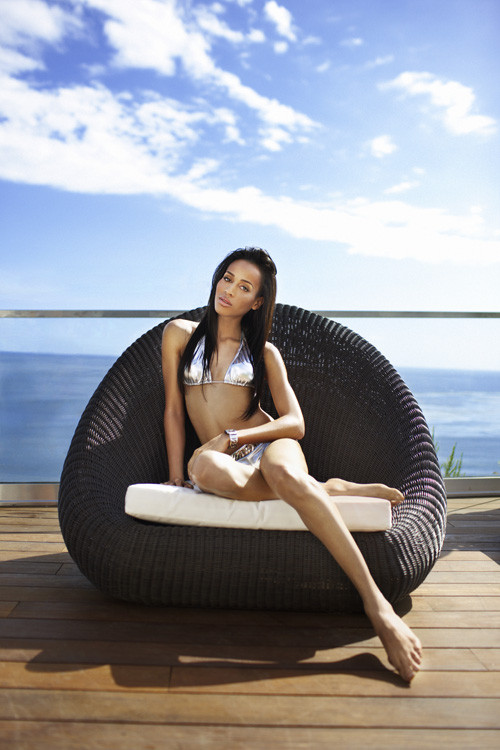
Isis King, ANTM, cycle 11 and Cycle 17

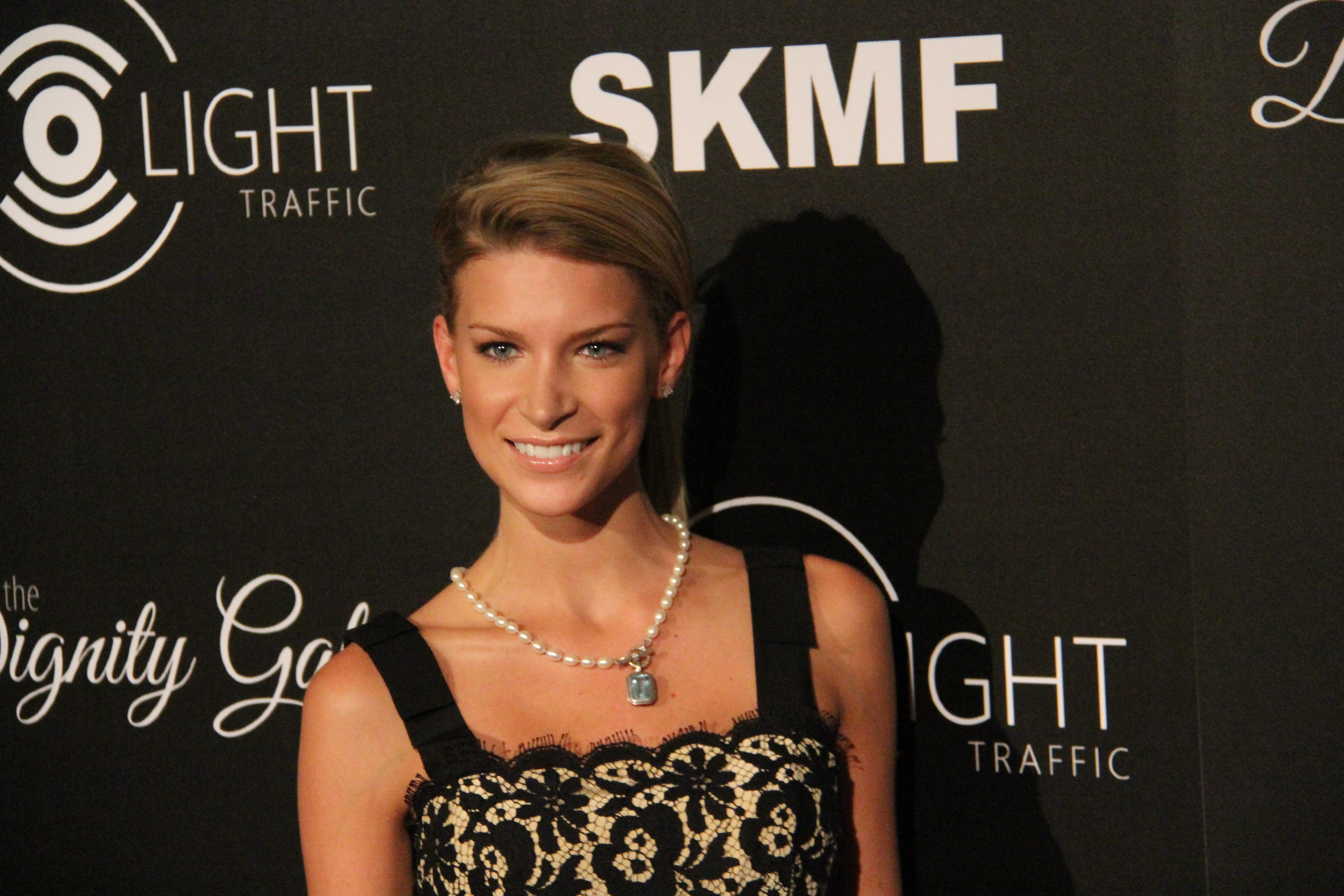
Clark Gilmer, ANTM, cycle 11

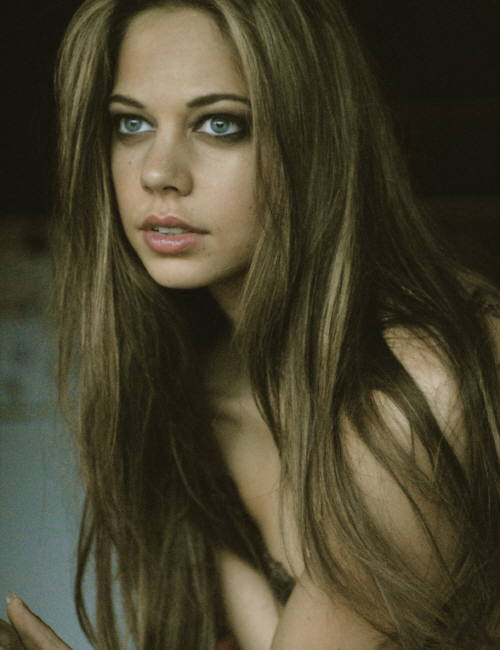
Lio Tipton, ANTM, cycle 11

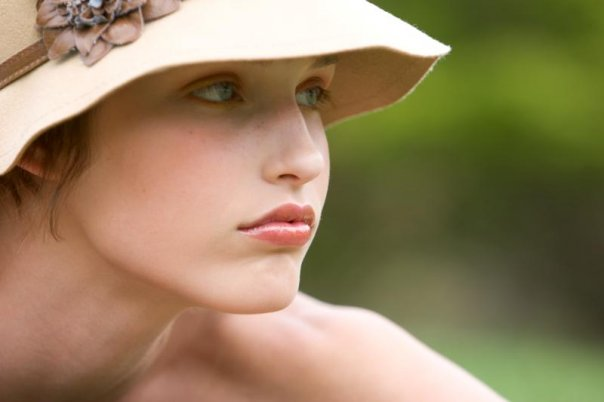
McKey Sullivan, winner of ANTM, cycle 11

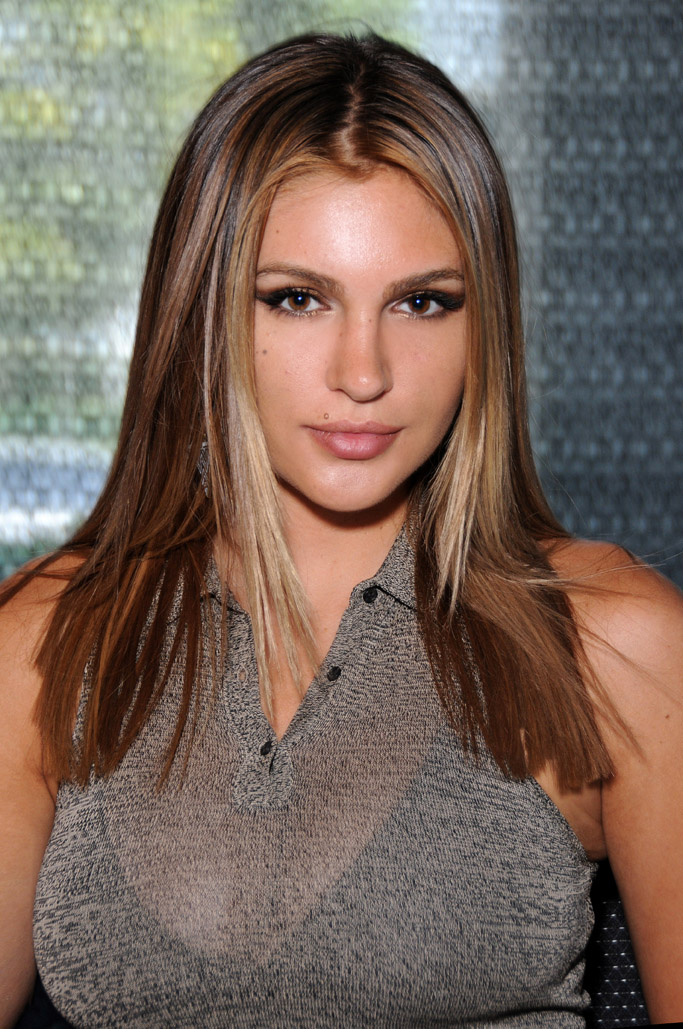
Natalie Pack, ANTM, cycle 12

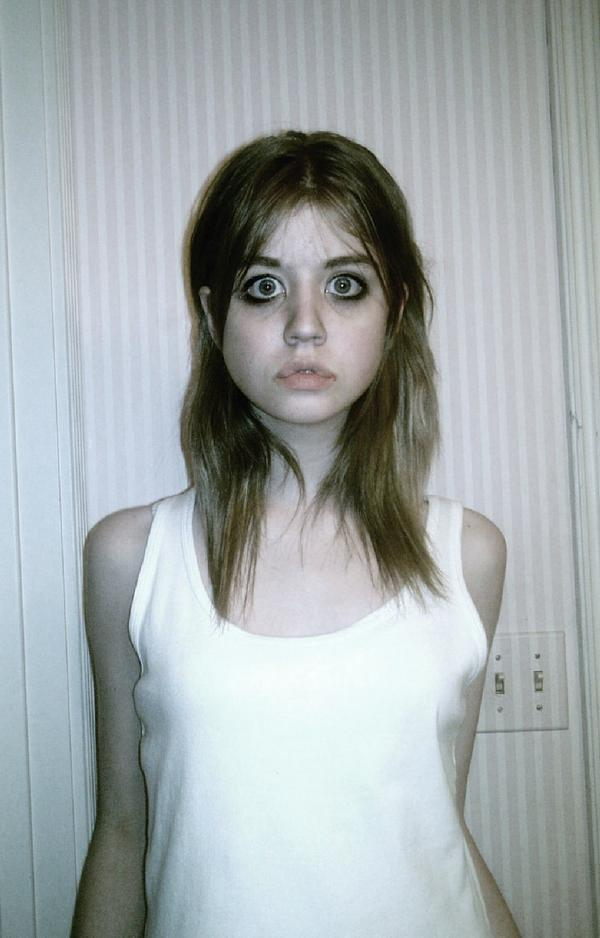
Allison Harvard, ANTM, cycle 12 and Cycle 17

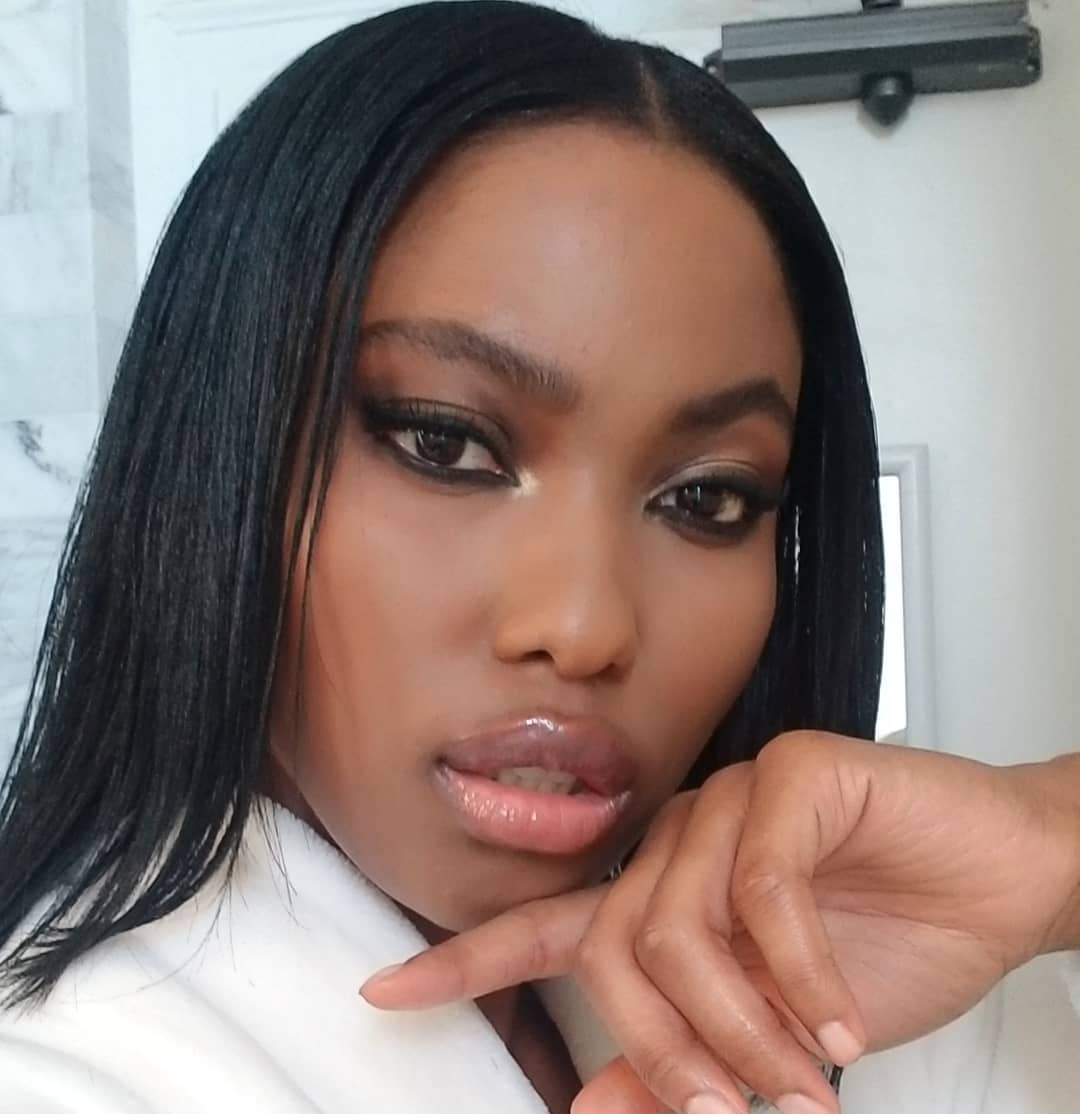
Candace M. Smith, ANTM, cycle 18

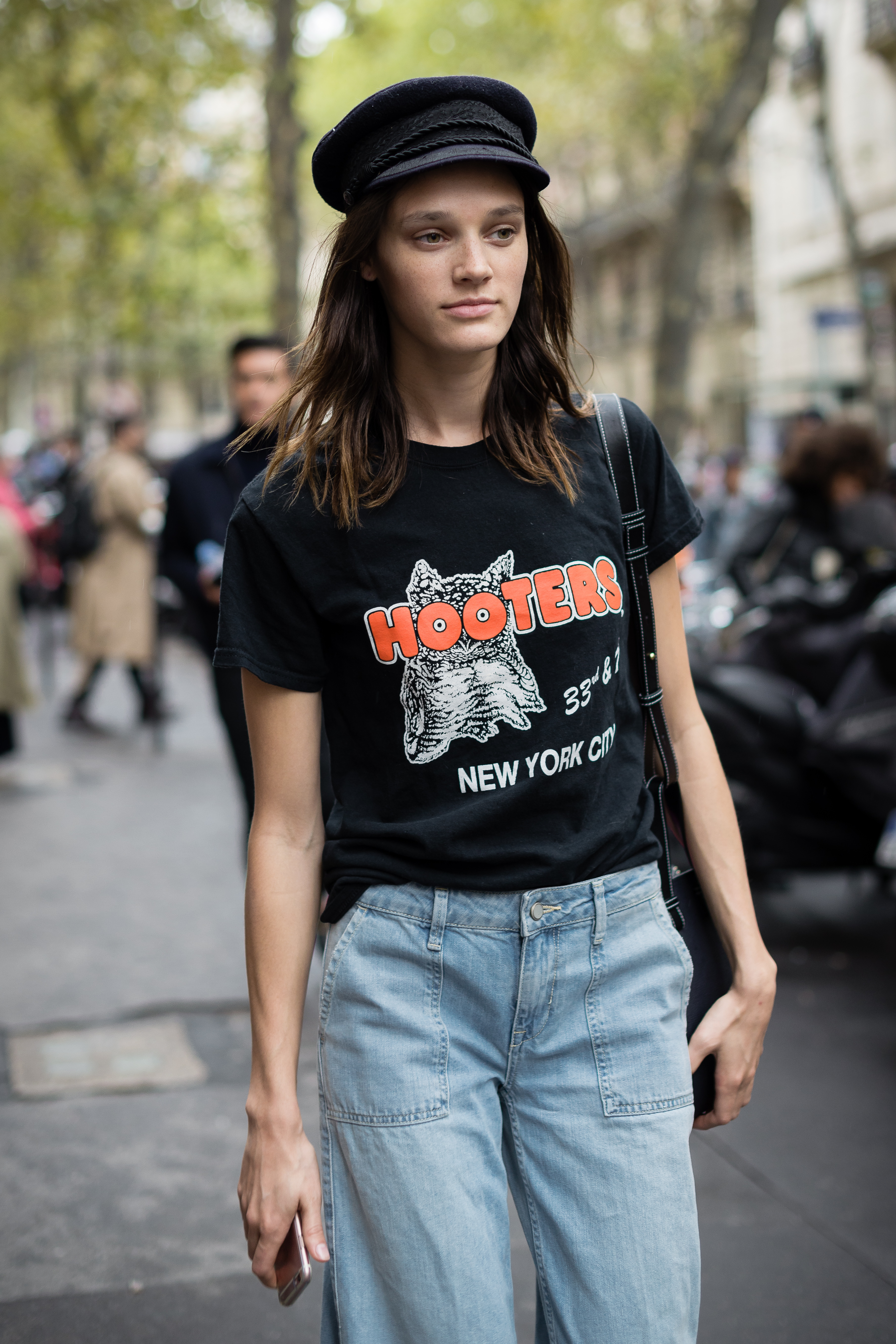
Leila Goldkuhl, ANTM, cycle 19

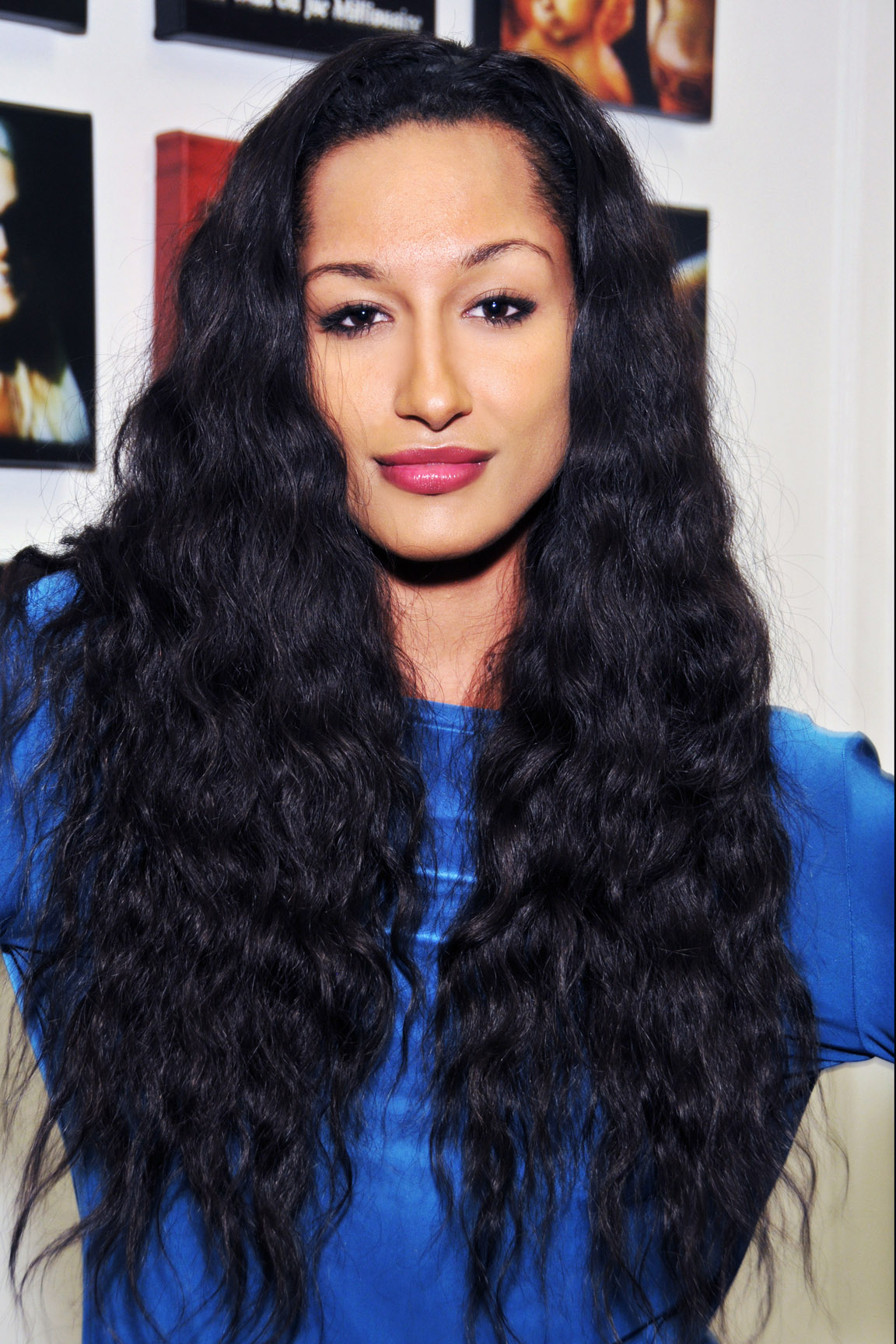
Kiara Belen, ANTM, cycle 19

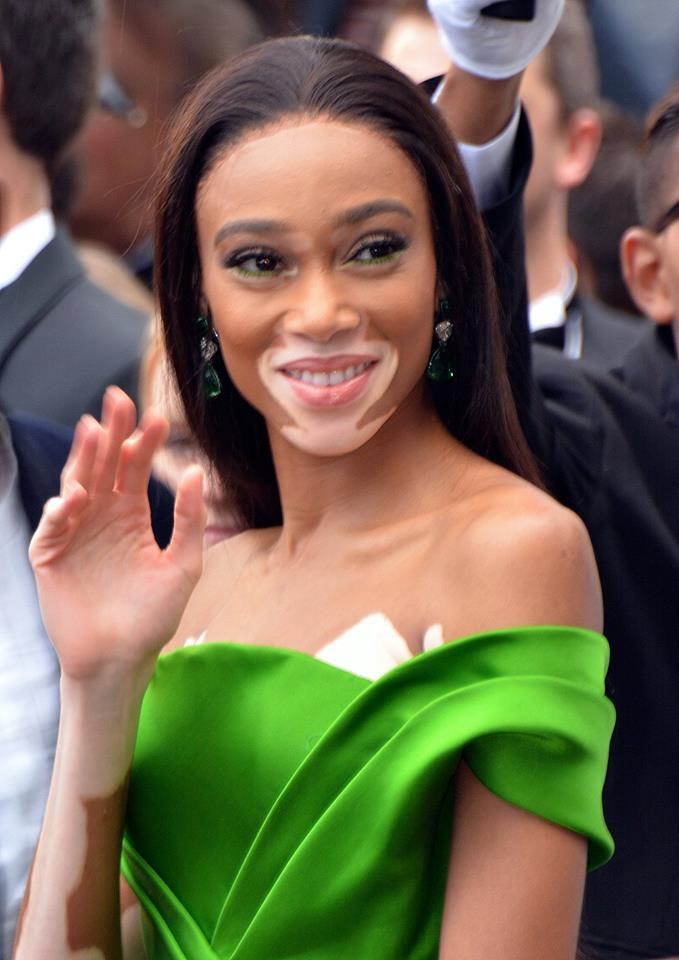
Chantelle ”Winnie Harlow" Young, ANTM, cycle 21

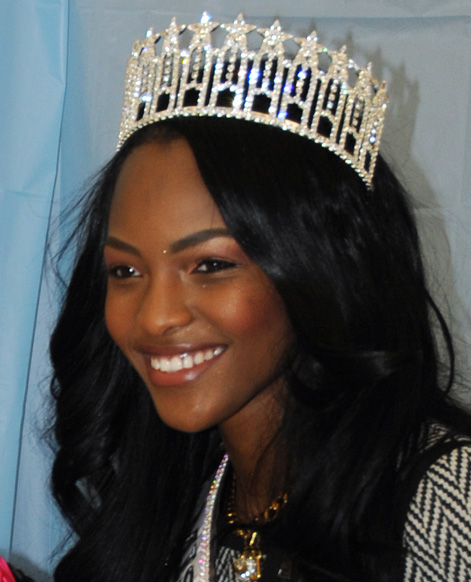
Mamé Adjei, ANTM, cycle 22

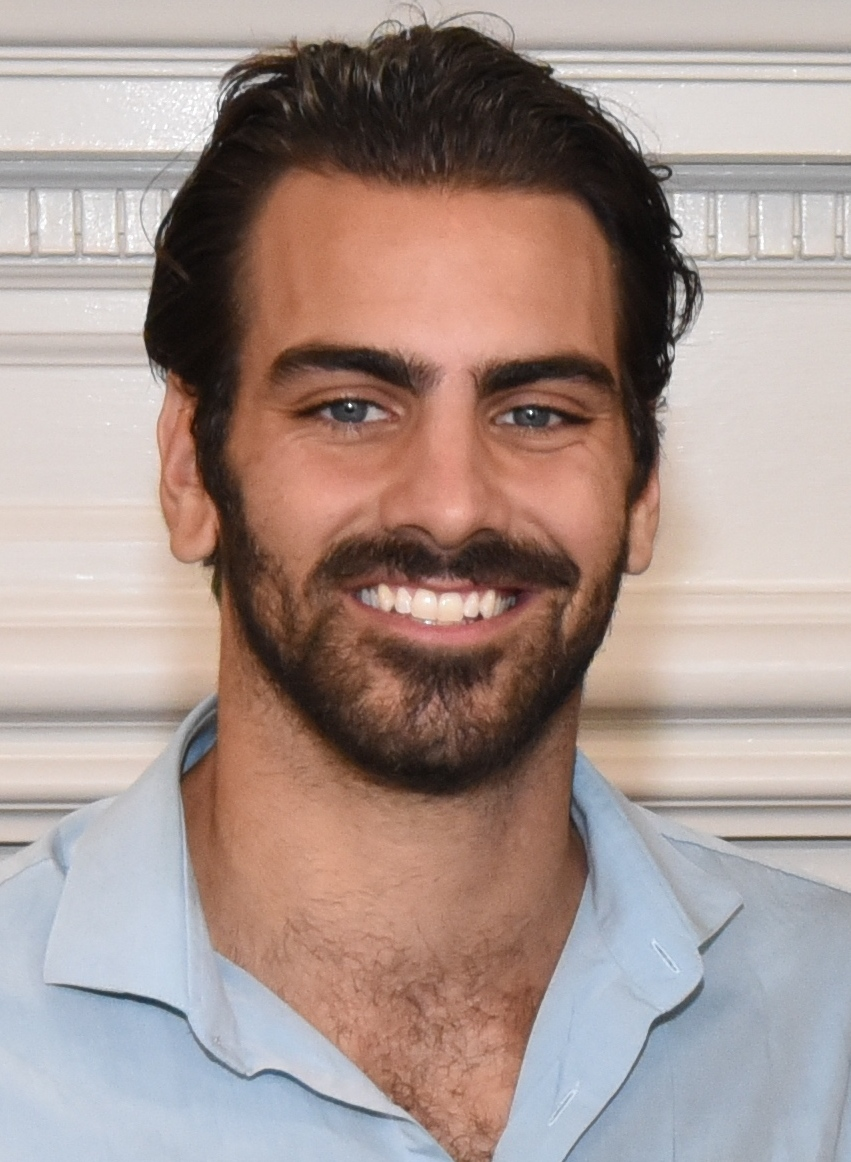
Nyle DiMarco, winner of ANTM, cycle 22

The contestant participated in Modelville, a spin-off from ANTM looking for the next spokesmodel for Carol's Daughter.
The contestant participated a second time in the All-Star cycle.
The contestant previously participated in a cycle of Britain's Next Top Model.

Name	Age^{1}	Hometown	Cycle	Finish
Tessa Carlson	19	Chicago, IL	Cycle 1	10th
Katie Cleary	21	Glenview, IL	Cycle 1	9th
Nicole Panattoni	22	Rancho Murieta, CA	Cycle 1	8th
Ebony Haith	24	Harlem, NY	Cycle 1	7th
Giselle Samson	18	Corona, CA	Cycle 1	6th
Kesse Wallace	21	North Little Rock, AR	Cycle 1	5th
Robin Manning	27	Memphis, TN	Cycle 1	4th
Elyse Sewell	20	Albuquerque, NM	Cycle 1	3rd
Shannon Stewart	18	Franklin, OH	Cycle 1	Runner-up
Adrianne Curry	20	Joliet, IL	Cycle 1	Winner
Anna Bradfield	24	LaGrange, GA	Cycle 2	12th
Bethany Harris	22	Houston, TX	Cycle 2	11th
Heather Blumberg	18	Moreno Valley, CA	Cycle 2	10th
Jenascia Chakos	21	Burien, WA	Cycle 2	9th
Xiomara Frans	25	Morganville, NJ	Cycle 2	8th
Catie Anderson	18	Willmar, MN	Cycle 2	7th
Sara Racey-Tabrizi	22	Seattle, WA	Cycle 2	6th
Camille McDonald	25	Mamaroneck, NY	Cycle 2	5th
April Wilkner	23	Miami Beach, FL	Cycle 2	4th
Shandi Sullivan	21	Kansas City, MO	Cycle 2	3rd
Mercedes Scelba-Shorte	22	Valencia, CA	Cycle 2	Runner-up
Yoanna House	23	Jacksonville, FL	Cycle 2	Winner
Magdalena Rivas	24	Worcester, MA	Cycle 3	14th
Leah Darrow	24	Oklahoma City, OK	Cycle 3	13th
Julie Titus	20	Kent, WA	Cycle 3	12th
Kristi Grommet	20	St. Louis, MO	Cycle 3	11th
Jennipher Frost	22	Pocatello, ID	Cycle 3	10th
Kelle Jacob	20	New York City, NY	Cycle 3	9th
Cassie Grisham	19	Norman, OK	Cycle 3	8th
Toccara Jones	23	Dayton, OH	Cycle 3	7th
Nicole Borud	21	Minot, ND	Cycle 3	6th
Norelle Van Herk	20	Newport Beach, CA	Cycle 3	5th
Ann Markley	21	Erie, PA	Cycle 3	4th
Amanda Swafford	25	Hendersonville, NC	Cycle 3	3rd
Yaya DaCosta	21	Harlem, NY	Cycle 3	Runner-up
Eva Pigford	20	Los Angeles	Cycle 3	Winner
Brita Petersons	25	La Cañada Flintridge, CA	Cycle 4	14th
Sarah Dankelman	20	Baltimore, MD	Cycle 4	13th
Brandy Rusher	19	Houston, TX	Cycle 4	12th
Noelle Staggers	20	Reno, NV	Cycle 4	11th
Lluvy Gomez	21	Modesto, CA	Cycle 4	10th
Tiffany Richardson	21	Miami, FL	Cycle 4	9th/8th
Rebecca Epley	22	Stillwater, MN	Cycle 4	9th/8th
Tatiana Dante	18	Maui, HI	Cycle 4	7th
Michelle Deighton	19	Terre Haute, IN	Cycle 4	6th
Christina Murphy	24	Tallahassee, FL	Cycle 4	5th
Brittany Brower	22	Tallahassee, FL	Cycle 4	4th
Keenyah Hill	19	Compton, CA	Cycle 4	3rd
Kahlen Rondot	20	Broken Arrow, OK	Cycle 4	Runner-up
Naima Mora	20	Detroit, MI	Cycle 4	Winner
Ashley Black	22	Fort Lauderdale, FL	Cycle 5	13th
Ebony Taylor	18	Sylmar, CA	Cycle 5	12th
Cassandra Whitehead	19	Houston, TX	Cycle 5	11th (quit)
Sarah Rhoades	18	Boonville, MO	Cycle 5	10th
Diane Hernandez	23	Orlando, FL	Cycle 5	9th
Coryn Woitel	19	Minneapolis, MN	Cycle 5	8th
Kyle Kavanagh	19	Dexter, MI	Cycle 5	7th
Lisa D'Amato	24	Los Angeles	Cycle 5	6th
Kim Stolz	21	New York City, NY	Cycle 5	5th
Jayla Rubinelli	20	Tucson, AZ	Cycle 5	4th
Bre Scullark	20	Harlem, NY	Cycle 5	3rd
Nik Pace	21	Atlanta, GA	Cycle 5	Runner-up
Nicole Linkletter	20	Grand Forks, ND	Cycle 5	Winner
Kathy Hoxit	20	Brevard, NC	Cycle 6	13th
Wendy Wiltz	22	New Orleans, LA	Cycle 6	12th
Kari Schmidt	18	Brookings, SD	Cycle 6	11th
Gina Choe	21	Odessa, FL	Cycle 6	10th
Mollie Sue Steenis	25	Tampa, FL	Cycle 6	9th
Leslie Mancia	18	Higley, AZ	Cycle 6	8th
Brooke Staricha	21	Corpus Christi, TX	Cycle 6	7th
Nnenna Agba	24	Houston, TX	Cycle 6	6th
Furonda Brasfield	24	Stuttgart, AR	Cycle 6	5th
Sara Albert	21	Davis, CA	Cycle 6	4th
Jade Cole	26	New York City, NY	Cycle 6	3rd
Joanie Dodds	24	Beaver Falls, PA	Cycle 6	Runner-up
Danielle Evans	20	Little Rock, AR	Cycle 6	Winner
Christian Evans	19	Columbia, SC	Cycle 7	13th
Megan Morris	22	San Francisco, CA	Cycle 7	12th
Monique Calhoun	19	Chicago, IL	Cycle 7	11th
Megg Morales	18	Los Angeles	Cycle 7	10th
A.J Stewart	20	Sacramento, CA	Cycle 7	9th
Brooke Miller	18	Keller, TX	Cycle 7	8th
Anchal Joseph	19	Homestead, FL	Cycle 7	7th
Jaeda Young	18	Parkersburg, IA	Cycle 7	6th
Michelle Babin	18	Anaheim, CA	Cycle 7	5th
Amanda Babin	18	Anaheim, CA	Cycle 7	4th
Eugena Washington	21	Palmdale, CA	Cycle 7	3rd
Melrose Bickerstaff	23	San Francisco, CA	Cycle 7	Runner-up
CariDee English	21	Fargo, ND	Cycle 7	Winner
Kathleen DuJour	20	Brooklyn, NY	Cycle 8	13th
Samantha Francis	19	Pinson, AL	Cycle 8	12th
Cassandra Watson	24	Seattle, WA	Cycle 8	11th
Felicia Provost	19	Houston, TX	Cycle 8	10th
Diana Zalewski	21	Garfield, NJ	Cycle 8	9th
Sarah VonderHaar	20	Lake Zurich, IL	Cycle 8	8th
Whitney Cunningham	21	West Palm Beach, FL	Cycle 8	7th
Jael Strauss	22	Detroit, MI	Cycle 8	6th
Brittany Hatch	21	Savannah, GA	Cycle 8	5th
Dionne Walters	20	Montgomery, AL	Cycle 8	4th
Renee DeWitt	20	Maui, HI	Cycle 8	3rd
Natasha Galkina	21	Dallas, TX	Cycle 8	Runner-up
Jaslene Gonzalez	20	Chicago, IL	Cycle 8	Winner
Mila Bouzinova	20	Boston, MA	Cycle 9	13th
Kimberly Leemans	20	Ocala, FL	Cycle 9	12th
Victoria Marshman	20	New Haven, CT	Cycle 9	11th
Janet Mills	22	Bainbridge, GA	Cycle 9	10th
Ebony Morgan	20	Chicago, IL	Cycle 9	9th (quit)
Sarah Hartshorne	20	Heath, MA	Cycle 9	8th
Ambreal Williams	19	Dallas, TX	Cycle 9	7th
Lisa Jackson	20	Jersey City, NJ	Cycle 9	6th
Heather Kuzmich	21	Valparaiso, IN	Cycle 9	5th
Bianca Golden	18	Queens, NY	Cycle 9	4th
Jenah Doucette	18	Farmington, CT	Cycle 9	3rd
Chantal Jones	19	Austin, TX	Cycle 9	Runner-up
Saleisha Stowers	21	Los Angeles	Cycle 9	Winner
Kim Rydzewski^{2}	20	Worcester, MA	Cycle 10	14th (quit)
Atalya Slater	18	Brooklyn, NY	Cycle 10	13th
Allison Kuehn	18	Waunakee, WI	Cycle 10	12th
Amis Jenkins	20	Bartlesville, OK	Cycle 10	11th
Marvita Washington	23	San Francisco, CA	Cycle 10	10th
Aimee Wright	18	Spanaway, WA	Cycle 10	9th
Claire Unabia	24	New York City, NY	Cycle 10	8th
Stacy-Ann Fequiere	22	Miami, FL	Cycle 10	7th
Lauren Utter	22	Brooklyn, NY	Cycle 10	6th
Katarzyna Dolinska	22	Roslyn, NY	Cycle 10	5th
Dominique Reighard	23	Columbus, OH	Cycle 10	4th
Fatima Siad	21	Boston, MA	Cycle 10	3rd
Anya Kop	18	Honolulu, HI	Cycle 10	Runner-up
Whitney Thompson	20	Atlantic Beach, FL	Cycle 10	Winner
Sharaun Brown	18	Chicago, IL	Cycle 11	14th
Nikeysha Clarke	19	Bronx, NY	Cycle 11	13th
Brittany Rubalcaba	19	Henderson, NV	Cycle 11	12th
Hannah White	18	Fairbanks, AK	Cycle 11	11th
Isis King	22	Prince George's County, MD	Cycle 11	10th
Clark Gilmer	19	Pawleys Island, SC	Cycle 11	9th
Lauren Brie Harding	20	Charlottesville, VA	Cycle 11	8th
Joslyn Pennywell	23	Lucky, LA	Cycle 11	7th
Sheena Sakai	21	Harlem, NY	Cycle 11	6th
Elina Ivanova	18	Seattle, WA	Cycle 11	5th
Marjorie Conrad	19	San Francisco, CA	Cycle 11	4th
Lio Tipton	19	Sacramento, CA	Cycle 11	3rd
Samantha Potter	18	Woodland Hills, CA	Cycle 11	Runner-up
McKey Sullivan	19	Lake Forest, IL	Cycle 11	Winner
Isabella Falk	19	Barboursville, VA	Cycle 12	13th
Jessica Santiago	18	Caguas, PR	Cycle 12	12th
Nijah Harris	18	Rancho Cucamonga, CA	Cycle 12	11th
Kortnie Coles	24	Houston, TX	Cycle 12	10th
Sandra Nyanchoka	19	Rockville, MD	Cycle 12	9th
Tahlia Brookins	18	Phoenix, AZ	Cycle 12	8th
London Levi	18	Arlington, TX	Cycle 12	7th
Natalie Pack	19	Palos Verdes, CA	Cycle 12	6th
Fo Porter	19	Albuquerque, NM	Cycle 12	5th
Celia Ammerman	25	Cynthiana, KY	Cycle 12	4th
Aminat Ayinde	21	Union, NJ	Cycle 12	3rd
Allison Harvard	20	New Orleans, LA	Cycle 12	Runner-up
Teyona Anderson	20	Woodstown, NJ	Cycle 12	Winner
Amber DePace	18	Oceanside, CA	Cycle 13	15th (quit)
Lisa Ramos	19	Queens, NY	Cycle 13	14th
Rachel Echelberger	18	Woodland, CA	Cycle 13	13th
Courtney Davies	22	Plantation, FL	Cycle 13	12th
Lulu Braithwaite	19	Brooklyn, NY	Cycle 13	11th
Bianca Richardson	21	Columbia, SC	Cycle 13	10th
Ashley Howard	22	Chicago, IL	Cycle 13	9th
Kara Vincent	18	Fort Wayne, IN	Cycle 13	8th
Rae Weisz	21	Rochester, MN	Cycle 13	7th
Brittany Markert	21	Livermore, CA	Cycle 13	6th
Sundai Love	18	Bakersfield, CA	Cycle 13	5th
Jennifer An	23	Philadelphia, PA	Cycle 13	4th/3rd
Erin Wagner	18	Spring Grove, IL	Cycle 13	4th/3rd
Laura Kirkpatrick	19	Stanford, KY	Cycle 13	Runner-up
Nicole Fox	18	Louisville, CO	Cycle 13	Winner
Gabrielle Kniery	18	St. Louis, MO	Cycle 14	13th
Naduah Rugely	22	San Diego, CA	Cycle 14	12th
Ren Vokes	22	Dallas, TX	Cycle 14	11th
Simone Lewis	19	Lenexa, KS	Cycle 14	10th
Tatianna Kern	21	ʻEwa Beach, HI	Cycle 14	9th
Brenda Arens	23	Houston, TX	Cycle 14	8th
Anslee Payne-Franklin	23	Dacula, GA	Cycle 14	7th
Alasia Ballard	18	Marietta, GA	Cycle 14	6th
Jessica Serfaty	18	Conway, AR	Cycle 14	5th
Angelea Preston	23	Buffalo, NY	Cycle 14	4th/3rd
Alexandra Underwood	21	Kerrville, TX	Cycle 14	4th/3rd
Raina Hein	22	Minnetonka, MN	Cycle 14	Runner-up
Krista White	25	Pine Bluff, AR	Cycle 14	Winner
Anamaria Mirdita	18	Queens, NY	Cycle 15	14th
Terra White	24	Arlington, TX	Cycle 15	13th
Sara Blackamore	21	Menifee, CA	Cycle 15	12th
Rhianna Atwood	20	San Diego, CA	Cycle 15	11th
Lexie Tomchek	18	Geneva, IL	Cycle 15	10th
Kacey Leggett	20	Palmdale, CA	Cycle 15	9th
Kendal Brown	23	Northport, AL	Cycle 15	8th
Esther Petrack	18	Boston, MA	Cycle 15	7th
Liz Williams	21	Arlington, TX	Cycle 15	6th
Chris White	20	Arlington, TX	Cycle 15	5th
Kayla Ferrel	19	Rockford, IL	Cycle 15	4th/3rd
Jane Randall	19	Baltimore, MD	Cycle 15	4th/3rd
Chelsey Hersley	23	Boise, ID	Cycle 15	Runner-up
Ann Ward	19	Dallas, TX	Cycle 15	Winner
Angelia Alvarez	20	Miami, FL	Cycle 16	14th
Ondrei Edwards	18	Muskegon, MI	Cycle 16	13th (quit)
Nicole Lucas	20	Orlando, FL	Cycle 16	12th
Dominique Waldrup	23	Houston, TX	Cycle 16	11th
Rune Longoria	18	Edinburg, TX	Cycle 16	10th
Dalya Morrow	21	Corona, CA	Cycle 16	9th
Monique Weingart	19	Hebron, IL	Cycle 16	8th
Mikaela Schipani	21	Boca Raton, FL	Cycle 16	7th
Jaclyn Poole	20	Belton, TX	Cycle 16	6th
Kasia Pilewicz	26	Wheaton, IL	Cycle 16	5th
Alexandria Everett	21	Huntington Beach, CA	Cycle 16	4th
Hannah Jones	20	Houston, TX	Cycle 16	3rd
Molly O'Connell	22	Charleston, SC	Cycle 16	Runner-up
Brittani Kline	19	Beech Creek, PA	Cycle 16	Winner
Brittany Brower	29	Tallahassee, FL	Cycle 17	14th
Sheena Sakai	24	Harlem, NY	Cycle 17	13th
Isis King	25	Prince George's County, MD	Cycle 17	12th
Camille McDonald	33	Mamaroneck, NY	Cycle 17	11th
Bre Scullark	26	Harlem, NY	Cycle 17	10th
Kayla Ferrel	20	Rockford, IL	Cycle 17	9th/8th
Bianca Golden	22	Queens, NY	Cycle 17	9th/8th
Alexandria Everett	22	Huntington Beach, CA	Cycle 17	7th
Shannon Stewart	27	Franklin, OH	Cycle 17	6th
Dominique Reighard	26	Columbus, OH	Cycle 17	5th
Laura Kirkpatrick	22	Stanford, KY	Cycle 17	4th
Angelea Preston	25	Buffalo, NY	Cycle 17	3rd^{2}
Allison Harvard	23	New Orleans, LA	Cycle 17	Runner-up
Lisa D'Amato	30	Los Angeles	Cycle 17	Winner
Jasmia Robinson	24	London, England	Cycle 18	14th
Mariah Watchman	20	Pendleton, OR	Cycle 18	13th
Louise Watts	25	South London, England	Cycle 18	12th (quit)
Candace Smith	22	Brooklyn, NY	Cycle 18	11th
Ashley Brown	22	Armadale, Scotland	Cycle 18	10th
AzMarie Livingston	24	Milwaukee, WI	Cycle 18	9th
Kyle Gober	20	Magnolia, TX	Cycle 18	8th
Seymone Cohen-Fobish	19	Augusta, GA	Cycle 18	7th
Catherine Thomas	21	Folkestone, England	Cycle 18	6th
Eboni Davis	18	Seattle, WA	Cycle 18	5th
Alisha White	20	South London, England	Cycle 18	4th (quit)
Annaliese Dayes	24	London, England	Cycle 18	3rd
Laura LaFrate	20	Scotia, NY	Cycle 18	Runner-up
Sophie Sumner	21	Oxford, England	Cycle 18	Winner
Jessie Rabideau	23	Speedway, IN	Cycle 19	13th
Maria Tucker	22	Las Cruces, NM	Cycle 19	12th (quit)
Darian Ellis	22	Baton Rouge, LA	Cycle 19	11th
Destiny Strudwick	18	Columbus, OH	Cycle 19	10th
Yvonne Powless	20	Minneapolis, MN	Cycle 19	9th
Allyssa Vuelma	20	Fort Lauderdale, FL	Cycle 19	8th
Brittany Brown	18	Gilbert, AZ	Cycle 19	7th
Victoria Henley	18	Colquitt, GA	Cycle 19	6th
Kristin Kagay	19	Jacksonville, FL	Cycle 19	5th
Nastasia Scott	19	East Stroudsburg, PA	Cycle 19	4th
Leila Goldkuhl	20	Framingham, MA	Cycle 19	3rd
Kiara Belen	22	Las Vegas, NV	Cycle 19	Runner-up
Laura James	21	Cambridge, NY	Cycle 19	Winner
Bianca Alexa	18	Los Angeles	Cycle 20	16th
Chris Schellenger	24	Houston, TX	Cycle 20	15th
Chlea Ramirez	20	Bear, DE	Cycle 20	14th
Mike Scocozza	27	Los Angeles	Cycle 20	13th
Kanani Andaluz	19	Chicago, IL	Cycle 20	12th
Jiana Davis	20	Denver, CO	Cycle 20	11th
Phil Sullivan	24	Lanesborough, MA	Cycle 20	10th
Alexandra Agro	21	Palm City, FL	Cycle 20	9th
Don Benjamin	25	Minneapolis, MN	Cycle 20	8th
Nina Burns	18	Berkeley Heights, NJ	Cycle 20	7th
Jeremy Rohmer	20	Mission Viejo, CA	Cycle 20	6th
Renee Bhagwandeen	24	Fort Lauderdale, FL	Cycle 20	5th
Chris Hernandez	25	North Bergen, NJ	Cycle 20	4th
Cory Hindorff	22	Philadelphia, PA	Cycle 20	3rd
Marvin Cortés	20	Bronx, NY	Cycle 20	Runner-up
Jourdan Miller	19	Bend, OR	Cycle 20	Winner
Ivy Timlin	20	Buffalo, NY	Cycle 21	14th
Romeo Tostado	23	Salinas, CA	Cycle 21	13th^{1}
Ben Schreen	24	Waverly, IA	Cycle 21	12th
Kari Calhoun	23	Coppell, TX	Cycle 21	11th
Matthew Smith	24	Highlands Ranch, CO	Cycle 21	10th
Denzel Wells	23	Houston, TX	Cycle 21	9th
Mirjana Puhar	18	Charlotte, NC	Cycle 21	8th
Raelia Lewis	22	Philadelphia, PA	Cycle 21	7th
Chantelle Young	19	Toronto, Canada	Cycle 21	6th
Shei Phan	22	Oklahoma City, OK	Cycle 21	5th
Lenox Tillman	19	Newnan, GA	Cycle 21	4th
Adam Smith	26	Memphis, TX	Cycle 21	3rd
Will Jardell	23	Nederland, TX	Cycle 21	Runner-up
Keith Carlos	26	Bridgeport, CT	Cycle 21	Winner
Delanie Dischert	21	Wilmington, DE	Cycle 22	14th
Stefano Churchill	23	Virginia Beach, VA	Cycle 22	13th
Ava Capra	19	Los Angeles	Cycle 22	12th
Ashley Molina	21	Brooklyn, NY	Cycle 22	11th
Courtney DuPerow	21	Avon Lake, OH	Cycle 22	10th
Bello Sánchez	26	Los Angeles, CA	Cycle 22	9th
Justin Kim	23	Springfield, VA	Cycle 22	8th
Dustin McNeer	18	Kernersville, NC	Cycle 22	7th
Hadassah Richardson	23	Houston, TX	Cycle 22	6th
Devin Clark	22	San Francisco, CA	Cycle 22	5th
Mikey Heverly	26	Hollywood, FL	Cycle 22	4th/3rd
Lacey Rogers	18	El Dorado, AR	Cycle 22	4th/3rd
Mamé Adjei	23	Silver Spring, MD	Cycle 22	Runner-up
Nyle DiMarco	25	Washington, D.C.	Cycle 22	Winner
Justine Biticon	18	Panorama City, CA	Cycle 23	14th
Cherish Waters	25	Los Angeles, CA	Cycle 23	13th
Giah Hardeman	21	Bryan-College Station, TX	Cycle 23	12th
Krislian Rodriguez	25	Los Angeles, CA	Cycle 23	11th
Kyle McCoy	23	Darien, CT	Cycle 23	10th
Binta Dibba	25	Seattle, WA	Cycle 23	9th
Marissa Hopkins	18	Houston, TX	Cycle 23	8th
Paige Mobley	22	Birmingham, MI	Cycle 23	7th
Tash Wells	26	San Jose, CA	Cycle 23	6th
Cody Wells	26	San Jose, CA	Cycle 23	5th
Courtney Nelson	25	San Francisco, CA	Cycle 23	4th
CoryAnne Roberts	19	Denpasar, Bali, Indonesia	Cycle 23	3rd
Tatiana Price	21	Brooklyn, NY	Cycle 23	Runner-up
India Gants	20	Seattle, WA	Cycle 23	Winner
Maggie Keating	20	Surry, ME	Cycle 24	15th
Ivana Thomas	23	Durham, NC	Cycle 24	14th
Liz Woodbury	24	Greenville, MA	Cycle 24	13th (quit)
Rhiyan Carreker	20	Orange County, CA	Cycle 24	12th
Coura Fall	24	Eastvale, CA	Cycle 24	11th
Liberty Netuschil	20	Lava Hot Springs, ID	Cycle 24	10th
Christina McDonald	34	Jenkintown, PA	Cycle 24	9th
Sandra Shehab	22	Cliffside Park, NJ	Cycle 24	8th
Brendi K Seiner	22	Nashville, TN	Cycle 24	7th (quit)
Erin Green	42	Pasadena, CA	Cycle 24	6th
Rio Summers	23	Detroit, MI	Cycle 24	5th
Shanice Carroll	25	Murfreesboro, TN	Cycle 24	4th
Khrystyana Kazakova	32	New York, NY	Cycle 24	3rd
Jeana Turner	24	Minneapolis, MN	Cycle 24	Runner-up
Kyla Coleman	20	Lacey, WA	Cycle 24	Winner

=== Notes ===
1. Contestants' ages are at the time of their respective season's filming.
2. Disqualified.

=== Statistics ===
- Quitters: 10 – Cassandra Whitehead (Cycle 5), Ebony Morgan (Cycle 9), Kim Rydzewski (Cycle 10), Amber DePace (Cycle 13), Ondrei Edwards (Cycle 16), Louise Watts (Cycle 18), Alisha White (Cycle 18), Maria Tucker (Cycle 19), Liz Woodbury (Cycle 24) and Brendi K Seiner (Cycle 24)
- Disqualifications: 2 – Angelea Preston (Cycle 17) and Romeo Tostado (Cycle 21)
- Models eliminated outside of judging panel: 6 – Magdalena Rivas (Cycle 3), Hannah White (Cycle 11), Rachel Echelberger (Cycle 13), Terra White (Cycle 15), Cory Hindorff (Cycle 20) and Shanice Carroll (Cycle 24)
- Most times in the bottom two: 5 times – Ann Markley (Cycle 3), Bre Scullark (Cycle 5) and Jade Cole (Cycle 6)
- Most times in the bottom two for a winner: 4 times – Whitney Thompson (Cycle 10)
- Most times in the bottom two for a runner-up: 4 times - CoryAnne Roberts (Cycle 23)
- Fewest times in the bottom two for a winner: 0 times – Jaslene Gonzalez (Cycle 8), McKey Sullivan (Cycle 11), Nicole Fox (Cycle 13), Krista White (Cycle 14), Sophie Sumner (Cycle 18), Jourdan Miller (Cycle 20) and India Gants (Cycle 23)
- Fewest times in the bottom two for a runner-up: 0 times – Joanie Dodds (Cycle 6), Anya Kop (Cycle 10) and Mamé Adjei (Cycle 22)
- Most first call-outs: 7 times - Ann Ward (Cycle 15) and Jourdan Miller (Cycle 20)
- Most first call-outs for a runner-up: 5 times - Joanie Dodds (Cycle 6) and Anya Kop (Cycle 10)
- Least first call-outs for a winner: 1 time - Adrianne Curry (Cycle 1), Yoanna House (Cycle 2), Nicole Linkletter (Cycle 5), Danielle Evans (Cycle 6), Whitney Thompson (Cycle 10) and Brittani Kline (Cycle 16)
- Least first call-outs for a runner-up: 0 times - Laura Kirkpatrick (Cycle 13) and Chelsey Hersley (Cycle 15)

== Deaths ==
- Mirjana Puhar (Cycle 21), aged 19, February 24, 2015 - Homicide
- Kim Rydzewski (Cycle 10), aged 29, December 19, 2016
- Jael Strauss (Cycle 8), aged 34, December 4, 2018 - Breast cancer
