= America's Next Top Model season 23 =

America's Next Top Model
- Season 23
- Judges: Rita Ora; Ashley Graham; Drew Elliott; Law Roach
- No. of contestants: 14
- Winner: India Gants
- No. of episodes: 14

Release
- Original network: VH1
- Original release: December 12, 2016 – March 8, 2017

Season chronology
- ← Previous; Season 22 Next → Season 24

The twenty-third cycle of America's Next Top Model premiered on December 12, 2016, on VH1. It was the first cycle to air on the network following the series' cancellation by The CW. As opposed to the past three cycles, this cycle followed the series' original format of an all-female contest.

The cycle was presented by British singer Rita Ora, who took over from former model and businesswoman Tyra Banks. The judging panel was fully revamped, consisting of model Ashley Graham, Paper magazine chief creative officer Drew Elliott, and celebrity stylist Law Roach, replacing the previous panel consisting of Banks, fashion publicist Kelly Cutrone, and runway coach J. Alexander. Banks still served as the series' executive producer.

The winner of the competition was 20-year-old India Gants from Seattle, Washington, with Tatiana Price placing as the runner up.

== Prizes ==
- A fashion spread in Paper magazine.
- A talent contract with VH1.
- A contract with Rimmel London cosmetics.
- A cash prize of US$100,000

== Contestants ==
(Ages stated are at start of contest.)

Name	Age	Height	Hometown	Finish	Place
Justine Biticon	18	1.77 m (5 ft 9 1/2 in)	Panorama City, California	Episode 2	14
Cherish Waters	25	1.76 m (5 ft 9 1/2 in)	Los Angeles, California	Episode 3	13
Gailayh 'Giah' Hardeman	21	1.68 m (5 ft 6 in)	College Station–Bryan, Texas	Episode 5	12
Krislian Rodriguez	25	1.72 m (5 ft 7 1/2 in)	Los Angeles, California	Episode 6	11
Kyle McCoy	23	1.76 m (5 ft 9 1/2 in)	Darien, Connecticut	Episode 7	10
Binta Dibba	25	1.75 m (5 ft 9 in)	Seattle, Washington	Episode 8	9
Marissa Hopkins	18	1.77 m (5 ft 9 1/2 in)	Houston, Texas	Episode 9	8
Paige Mobley	22	1.80 m (5 ft 11 in)	Birmingham, Michigan	Episode 10	7
Tash Wells	26	1.78 m (5 ft 10 in)	San Jose, California	Episode 11	6
Cody Wells	26	1.78 m (5 ft 10 in)	San Jose, California	Episode 12	5
Courtney Nelson	25	1.72 m (5 ft 7 1/2 in)	San Francisco, California	Episode 14	4
CoryAnne Roberts	19	1.78 m (5 ft 10 in)	Los Angeles, California	Episode 15	3
Tatiana Price	21	1.77 m (5 ft 9 1/2 in)	Queens, New York	Episode 15	2
India Gants	20	1.74 m (5 ft 8 1/2 in)	Seattle, Washington	Episode 15	1

== Episodes ==
No. overall	No. in season	Title	Original release date	US viewers (millions)
286	1	"Business, Brand, Boss"	December 12, 2016	1.30
Twenty-eight contestants partook in their first photo shoot and went on go-sees for Philipp Plein and LaQuan Smith. The contestants then had one-on-one interviews with the judges, and the episode concluded with the selection of the top fourteen contestants.: Featured photographer: Massimo Campana; Special guests: Philipp Plein, LaQuan Smith
287	2	"Lights, Camera, Catwalk"	December 19, 2016	1.19
The contestants received runway training from model and former Canada's Next Top Model judge Stacey McKenzie. Later, the contestants were introduced to Zendaya, and took part in a runway challenge at the Marquee Nightclub, at the end of which they had to dive into the crowd for their first photo shoot. At elimination, Justine became the first contestant to leave the competition.: Featured photographer: Pieter Henket; Special guests: Stacey McKenzie, Zendaya
288	3	"Make Your Mark"	December 26, 2016	1.15
The contestants received makeovers and had their photos taken by Ellen von Unwerth during a nude photo shoot in groups. At elimination, Cherish became the second contestant to leave the competition.: Featured photographer: Ellen von Unwerth; Special guests: Sally Hershberger
289	4	"Major Key Alert"	January 2, 2017	1.17
The contestants met DJ Khaled for a challenge in teams where they had to film each other wearing Rita Ora's Tezenis lingerie, and Courtney was chosen as the challenge winner. The contestants were later introduced to the editorial director of Paper magazine, Mickey Boardman, and had to create social media stories using three images from a vip party for their next photo shoot. At elimination, Tash became the third contestant to leave the competition.: Special guests: Mickey Boardman, DJ Khaled, Jasmine Saunders
290	5	"Avant Garde"	January 9, 2017	1.19
The contestants had a challenge regarding their personal style, which was won by Tatiana, and later had an avant-garde couture photo shoot wearing designs by Nicola Formichetti at a local supermarket. At elimination, Giah became the fourth contestant to leave the competition.: Featured photographer: Jack Waterlot; Special guests: Nicola Formichetti
291	6	"Out for the Count"	January 16, 2017	1.04
The challenge this week, which was won by Paige, was to pose while jumping on a trampoline. The contestants later took part in a photo shoot where they had to pose as boxers alongside model Chanel Iman. At elimination, Krislian became the fifth contestant to leave the competition.: Featured photographer: Massimo Campana, Pieter Henket; Special guests: Chanel Iman
292	7	"X Marks the Spot"	January 23, 2017	1.30
The contestants had a lesson with choreographer Chris Grant, and later had a dance-themed challenge, which was won by Tatiana. At the photo shoot, the contestants had to star in a music video directed by Director X. At elimination, Kyle became the sixth contestant to leave the competition.: Featured director: Director X; Special guests: Stacey McKenzie, Chris Grant
293	8	"The Glamorous Life"	January 30, 2017	1.01
The contestants had a luxury photo shoot with Jason Derulo on a private jet, and at panel, Binta became the seventh contestant to be eliminated.: Featured photographer: Douglas Friedman; Special guests: Jason Derulo, Philipp Plein
294	9	"The Comeback"	February 1, 2017	0.54
The top seven contestants had to perform in music video against the formerly eliminated models, with one of them re-entering the competition immediately following the week's elimination, effectively replacing that week's eliminated contestant. The judges eliminated Marissa and determined that Tash would return to the competition.: Featured director: Drew Elliott; Special guests: French Montana, Tanisha Scott, Nefertari Green, Christian Cowan
295	10	"Platform Power"	February 8, 2017	0.71
The contestants were challenged to create a public service announcement inspired by the Amber Rose SlutWalk Festival, where CoryAnne, Courtney and Tatiana were chosen as the winners. They were later photographed in a shoot where they had to embody several celebrity icons. At panel, Paige became the ninth contestant to leave the competition.: Featured photographer: Vijat Mohindra; Special guests: Amber Rose, Stacey McKenzie
296	11	"Celebrity Life"	February 15, 2017	0.64
The top six contestants had a challenge, won by Courtney, in which they were photographed by paparazzi in the street. On set, the contestants were photographed in a mock-cover and beauty shoot for Paper magazine. At elimination, Tash became the ninth contestant to leave the competition.: Featured photographer: Vijat Mohindra; Special guest: Mickey Boardman
297	12	"And Action!"	February 22, 2017	0.69
The contestants had an acting challenge with Adrienne C. Moore, where Courtney was chosen as the winner. They later had a motion beauty shoot before meeting the judges for the next elimination, where Cody became the tenth contestant to leave the competition.: Featured director: Drew Elliott; Special guest: Susan Batson, Adrienne C. Moore
298	13	"Beyond the Scenes, Beyond the Flash"	February 23, 2017	0.69
This episode recapped the entire cycle, and showed previously unaired footage for the first time.
299	14	"Brand Like a Boss"	March 1, 2017	0.65
This week's challenge was a makeup challenge. The challenge was won by CoryAnne. The photoshoot this week was a commercial shoot for Rimmel London. At elimination, Courtney was eliminated before the finals.: Featured director: Steven Murashige; Special guest: Elena Ora, Kathy Jeung
300	15	"The Final Countdown"	March 8, 2017	0.86
The top three contestants shot their Paper Magazine spreads and then walked in a runway show for The Blonds. At panel, Tyra made an appearance as the cycle's final guest judge. CoryAnne was eliminated first leaving India and Tatiana as the final two. India became the 23rd winner of America's Next Top Model.: Featured photographer: Charlotte Rutherford; Special guest: Tyra Banks, Tinashe, Tim Stack, David & Philippe Blond, Stacy Mackenzie, Mickey Boardman, Claire Unabia, Stacy-Ann Fequiere, Phil Sullivan

== Summaries ==
=== Call-out order ===
Order	Episodes													
Order	1 (Note: In episode 1, the pool of 28 girls was reduced to 14. This call-out order does not reflect their performances that week.)	2	3	4	5	6	7	8	9 (Note: In episode 9, Tash returned to the competition after Marissa's elimination.)	10	11	12	13	14
1	Courtney	Cody	Courtney	Krislian	CoryAnne	CoryAnne	India	Tatiana	India	India; Tash	Cody	India	India	India
2	Giah	Courtney	CoryAnne	Binta	Cody	Cody	Paige	India	Paige	India; Tash	India	Courtney	Tatiana	Tatiana
3	Justine	Giah	Marissa	Paige	India	Tatiana	CoryAnne	Cody	Cody	Cody	Tatiana	CoryAnne	CoryAnne	CoryAnne
4	India	Marissa	India	Tatiana	Tatiana	Marissa	Tatiana	Marissa	CoryAnne	Courtney	CoryAnne	Tatiana	Courtney	
5	Tash	Tatiana	Cody	Giah	Courtney	Courtney	Cody	Paige	Tatiana	Tatiana	Courtney	Cody		
6	Tatiana	India	Tash	India	Binta	Paige	Binta	CoryAnne	Courtney	CoryAnne	Tash			
7	Kyle	Paige	Kyle	Courtney	Paige	Binta	Courtney	Courtney	Marissa	Paige				
8	Binta	Binta	Tatiana	Marissa	Marissa	India	Marissa	Binta						
9	CoryAnne	Tash	Paige	Kyle	Krislian	Kyle	Kyle							
10	Cherish	Kyle	Binta	Cody	Kyle	Krislian								
11	Paige	Cherish	Giah	CoryAnne	Giah									
12	Krislian	Krislian	Krislian	Tash										
13	Marissa	CoryAnne	Cherish											
14	Cody	Justine												

The contestant was eliminated
The contestant won the competition

=== Bottom two ===
Episode	Contestants	Eliminated
2	CoryAnne & Justine	Justine
3	Cherish & Krislian	Cherish
4	CoryAnne & Tash	Tash
5	Giah & Kyle	Giah
6	Krislian & Kyle	Krislian
7	Kyle & Marissa	Kyle
8	Binta & Courtney	Binta
9	Courtney & Marissa	Marissa
10	CoryAnne & Paige	Paige
11	Courtney & Tash	Tash
12	Cody & Tatiana	Cody
14	CoryAnne & Courtney	Courtney
15	CoryAnne, India & Tatiana	Cory Anne
15	India & Tatiana	Tatiana

The contestant was eliminated after their first time in the bottom two
The contestant was eliminated after their second time in the bottom two
The contestant was eliminated after their third time in the bottom two
The contestant was eliminated after their fourth time in the bottom two
The contestant was eliminated in the final judging and placed third
The contestant was eliminated in the final judging and placed as the runner-up

=== Average call-out order ===
Casting call-out order, comeback first call-out and final episode are not included.

Rank by average	Place	Model	Call-out total	Number of call-outs	Call-out average
1	1	India	36	12	3.00
2	5	Cody	40	11	3.64
3	2	Tatiana	48	12	4.00
4	4	Courtney	55	12	4.58
5	3	CoryAnne	57	12	4.75
6	7	Paige	48	9	5.33
7	8	Marissa	46	8	5.75
8	9	Binta	47	7	6.71
9	6	Tash	34	5	6.80
10	12	Giah	30	4	7.50
11	11	Krislian	44	5	8.80
12	10	Kyle	54	6	9.00
13	13	Cherish	24	2	12.00
14	14	Justine	14	1	14.00

=== Photo shoot guide ===
- Episode 1 photo shoot: Comp cards (casting)
- Episode 2 photo shoot: Crowd surfing
- Episode 3 photo shoot: Nude in groups
- Episode 4 photo shoot: Social media stories for Paper magazine
- Episode 5 photo shoot: Avant-garde designs in a supermarket
- Episode 6 photo shoot: Sports club with Chanel Iman
- Episode 7 video shoot: Gypsy sport fashion in Harlem
- Episode 8 photo shoot: Luxury jet-setters with Jason Derulo
- Episode 9 video shoot: Dance battles with French Montana
- Episode 10 photo shoot: Celebrity impersonations
- Episode 11 photo shoot: Paper magazine mock covers
- Episode 12 beauty video: Beauty transformations with face painting
- Episode 14 commercial: Rimmel in the streets of London
- Episode 15 photo shoot: Paper magazine editorial spread

=== Makeovers ===
- Cherish – Dyed fire-engine red
- Giah – Shoulder-length blonde bob weave
- Krislian – Straightened with bangs
- Kyle – Miley Cyrus inspired two-tone pompadour
- Binta – No makeover
- Marissa – Blown-out and relaxed with added volume
- Paige – Shoulder-length cut with blunt bangs and dyed ice blonde
- Tash – High-top fade
- Cody – Long dark blonde ombre weave
- Courtney – Marilyn Monroe inspired chin length bob and dyed platinum blonde
- CoryAnne – Long chestnut curls
- Tatiana – Long wavy weave
- India – Dyed lavender with pink highlights
