= America's Next Top Model season 24 =

Season of television series

America's Next Top Model
- Season 24
- Judges: Tyra Banks; Ashley Graham; Drew Elliott; Law Roach
- No. of contestants: 15
- Winner: Kyla Coleman
- No. of episodes: 15

Release
- Original network: VH1
- Original release: January 9 – April 10, 2018

Season chronology
- ← Previous; Season 23

The twenty-fourth and final cycle of America's Next Top Model premiered on January 9, 2018, and was the second season to air on VH1. Continuing from cycle 23, this cycle featured an all-female cast. However, in a first for the series, the maximum age limit was removed, allowing contestants of all ages (lowest age limit still being 18) to enter the contest. Although this cycle aired in 2018, it was filmed from May through June 2017.

Top Model franchise creator Tyra Banks returned as the show's host after being replaced for one cycle by singer Rita Ora. The judging panel, consisting of model Ashley Graham, Paper magazine chief creative officer Drew Elliott, and celebrity stylist Law Roach, remained otherwise unchanged.

The prizes for this cycle included a contract with Next Model Management, fashion spread in Paper magazine, a cash prize of US$100,000 from Pantene, and a featured avatar in the new America's Next Top Model Mobile Game.

The winner of the competition was 20-year-old Kyla Coleman from Lacey, Washington with Jeana Turner placing as the runner-up.

== Contestants ==
(Ages stated are at start of contest)

Contestant	Age	Height	Hometown	Finish	Place
Maggie Keating	20	1.70 m (5 ft 7 in)	Surry, Maine	Episode 2	15
Ivana Thomas	23	1.78 m (5 ft 10 in)	Durham, North Carolina	Episode 3	14
Elizabeth 'Liz' Woodbury	24	1.73 m (5 ft 8 in)	Greenville, Massachusetts	Episode 4	13 (quit)
Rhiyan Carreker	20	1.79 m (5 ft 10 1/2 in)	Orange, California	Episode 4	12
Shantelle 'Coura' Fall	24	1.76 m (5 ft 9 1/2 in)	Eastvale, California	Episode 5	11
Liberty Netuschil	20	1.70 m (5 ft 7 in)	Lava Hot Springs, Idaho	Episode 6	10
Christina McDonald	34	1.73 m (5 ft 8 in)	Jenkintown, Pennsylvania	Episode 7	9
Sandra Shehab	22	1.70 m (5 ft 7 in)	Cliffside Park, New Jersey	Episode 8	8
Brendi Katelyn 'Brendi K' Seiner	22	1.78 m (5 ft 10 in)	Nashville, Tennessee	Episode 9	7 (quit)
Erin Green	42	1.75 m (5 ft 9 in)	Riverside, California	Episode 10	6
Rio Summers	23	1.78 m (5 ft 10 in)	Detroit, Michigan	Episode 13	5
Shanice Carroll	25	1.75 m (5 ft 9 in)	Murfreesboro, Tennessee	Episode 15	4
Khrystyana Kazakova	32	1.78 m (5 ft 10 in)	New York, New York	Episode 15	3
Jeana Turner	24	1.68 m (5 ft 6 in)	Minneapolis, Minnesota	Episode 15	2
Kyla Coleman	20	1.78 m (5 ft 10 in)	Lacey, Washington	Episode 15	1

== Episodes ==
No. overall	No. in season	Title	Original release date	US viewers (millions)
301	1	"The Boss Is Back"	January 9, 2018	0.85
The contestants were introduced to the judges for the very first time and had panels, and again Tyra is the host replacing Rita Ora, and were made aware of the new casting process in which any of them could be eliminated at any point during casting week (as opposed to the mass-eliminations in previous cycles), and went back to regular elimination after top 15 to gradually reduce the pool of contestants. The contestants then had one-on-one auditions with the judges, which saw several contestants leave the competition and three contestants were cut. The top 18 contestants later met with judge Drew Elliot and fashion director Nicola Formichetti for an Avant-garde photo shoot in garden and runway challenge with live audience. The top 18 contestants moved into the model house, and at the end of the week, host Tyra Banks selected the finalized cast of 14 contestants. Immediately afterwards, Banks announced that one of the top 18 contestants who'd missed the final cut, Erin Green, would also be allowed to move on to the main competition, bringing the final number of contestants to 15.: Featured photographer: Renata Raksha; Special guests: Nicola Formichetti
302	2	"Beauty Is Los Angeles"	January 16, 2018	0.76
The contestants moved into the model home and choose their rooms and there was some dramas with Liz They later met runway coach Stacey McKenzie also judge on Canada's drag race for a catwalk lesson in beach. Coura, Khrystyana, Sandra and Kyla was appreciated for their walk while Shanice, Ivanna and Liz was deemed the worst by Stacey. Then Stacey revealed that the lesson was for preparation for an upcoming runway challenge at Venice Beach skate park, where the contestants had to model designs from Baja East and avoid skateboarders as they navigated across a skating ramp. As the winner of the challenge, Khrystyana was chosen to walk in a show for the label during New York fashion week. On set, later the contestants had a bohemian pregnancy photo shoot with fake bellies and float dresses with photographer Charlotte Rutherford, inspired by Hollywood's latest baby boom fashion trends. Erin became emotionally unbalanced at shoot remembering her 4 kids and Liberty criticised her. At panel, Rio, Jeana, Coura and Khrystyana was appreciated for their photos. Liz was appreciated for portraying her own personality in her photo. Despite Erin crying, she was appreciated by the judges for her good shot. While, Brendi for not showing her bold personality in her photo, Shanice for being overconfident in her photo, Sandra for not giving a good shot despite her strong looks and Maggie for being a homegirl were criticised by the judges. At elimination, Coura received best picture. Brendi K and Maggie landed in the bottom two. Brendi K was allowed to stay because of her bold personality and Tyra told Maggie that it was better for her to stay in her home. Maggie became the first contestants to leave the competition.: Featured photographer: Charlotte Rutherford; Special guests: Stacey McKenzie
303	3	"Beauty Is a Trademark"	January 23, 2018	0.38
The contestants arrived back at the house and immediately received a Tyra Mail alluding to the fact that makeovers would be taking place soon. Most of the models liked their makeovers but Liberty disliked her hair being dyed red, Shanice refused to get a weave because of her psoriasis, Jeana became emotional after her wig was removed and Ivanna did not like her long hair being shortened. After the makeovers were administered, the models met Director X for a video shoot meant to showcase their new trademark looks in a room full of mirrors. At panel, Brendi, Kyla and Jeana was appreciated for their performance, Liberty was appreciated for being confident and highlighting her makeover though she first told she disliked her makeover and Liz as her bubbly personality matched with her bubble gum pink hair. Liberty was deemed to be the best performer and was described as a "chameleon" by Tyra. Shanice and Ivanna landed in the bottom two as Shanice appeared confident but her looks was not good and Ivana for not being confident. Ivana was eliminated from the competition and Shanice was saved.: Featured director: Director X; Special guests: Leanne Citrone
304	4	"Beauty Is Drama"	January 30, 2018	0.79
The contestants received scripts for a screen test challenge with actor Kevin Phillips, which was judged by director Anthony Hemingway and Stacey McKenzie. Khrystyana was ultimately chosen as the challenge winner. Later on, the contestants were taken to a mansion for a photo shoot inspired by American Horror Story. Liz became emotionally unstable after Brendi and the rest of the contestants did not allow her to sleep and made fun of her. After a heart to heart conversation with Tyra, Liz decided to quit the competition due to health issues despite giving a strong photo during shoot. At elimination, Khrystyana received best photo. Coura and Rhiyan landed in the bottom two, and Rhiyan was eliminated from the competition.: Featured photographer: Ekaterina Belinskaya; Special guests: B. Akerlund, Anthony Hemingway, Stacey McKenzie, Kevin Phillips
305	5	"Beauty Is Unconventional"	February 6, 2018	0.68
The top eleven contestants had to work with renowned YouTuber Patrick Starr to shoot a beauty vlog which required them to use unconventional items as beauty tools. Sandra was chosen as the challenge winner, and was rewarded with a guest appearance on Starr's channel. On set, the contestants were stacked on top of one another to have their beauty shots taken. As winner of challenge, Sandra was chosen to shoot with Ashley Graham and was allowed to choose one more contestant. Sandra chose Kyla, her best friend and ally. At panel, Sandra's, Rio's and Khyrstyana's photo got unanimous praise. Shanice was appreciated for her great improvement. Kyla also was appreciated for her embracing her cheerful personality in her photo. While the rest of the contestants were declared as average and below average by the judges. At elimination, Rio received best picture. Christina and Coura landed in the bottom two, and Coura was eliminated from the competition.: Featured photographer: Tatiana Gerusova; Special guests: Patrick Starr
306	6	"Beauty Is Pride"	February 13, 2018	0.59
The top 10 contestants celebrated pride week at Micky's Bar, and took part in a self styled popup runway challenge for designer Christian Cowan which was won by Khrystyana. The contestants later had a photo shoot posing alongside former Drag Race contestants Manila Luzon, Valentina and Katya Zamolodchikova. Khrystyana's photo was said to be one of the best pictures in the season by the judges at panel. Jeana's and Sandra's photo also was appreciated. Shanice's improvements and good shot got unanimous praise. Erin, Christina and Rio was appreciated for their photos. Kyla's flower-girl shot and Liberty's inconsistency was criticized by the judges. Brendi's photo was determined as "average" by the judges. Khrystyana won best picture at elimination. Kyla and Liberty landed in the bottom two, and Liberty was eliminated from the competition as the judges saw more potential in Kyla.: Featured photographer: Katie Levine; Special guests: Valentina, Christian Cowan, Manila Luzon, Stacey McKenzie, Katya Zamolodchikova
307	7	"Beauty Is Raw"	February 20, 2018	0.66
The top nine contestants were challenged with the task of creating an anti-bullying PSA for the National Crime Prevention Council under the direction of Director X. As the winners of the challenge, Khrystyana, Kyla, and Sandra were chosen to have their video used as part of a national digital campaign for NCPC. On set, the contestants were stripped to their barest essentials and had their photographs taken by Tyra. Khrystyana got emotionally unstable being stripped to her barest essentials. At panel Kyla, Sandra, Brendi, Jeana and Rio was appreciated for their good shots. Khrystyana despite being emotionally unstable at set got a good shot. At elimination Brendi K, Jeana, Khrystyana, Kyla, Rio, Sandra, and Shanice received a joint first call-out as a group. Christina and Erin landed in the bottom two, and Christina was eliminated from the competition.: Featured photographer: Tyra Banks; Special guests: Yoko Sakakura, Shigeko Taylor, Director X, Stacey McKenzie
308	8	"Beauty Is Social"	February 27, 2018	0.33
The top eight contestants received a visit from Tyra and learned about effective techniques for taking a selfie. They were later introduced to model Jourdan Dunn in time for a selfie challenge in which they had to advertise Jourdan's clothing brand, LonDunn. Jeana was chosen as the winner of the challenge. On set the contestants were photographed by Tyra in a photo shoot where they had to pose with plus-sized male models covered in gold body paint. At elimination, Kyla received best photo. Khrystyana and Sandra landed in bottom two, and Sandra was eliminated from the competition.: Featured photographer: Tyra Banks; Special guests: Jourdan Dunn, Zach Miko, Miles Dausuel, Kevin Rivers, Michael; Guest judge: Jourdan Dunn
309	9	"Beauty Is Movement"	March 6, 2018	0.67
The top seven contestants met with Ashley Graham and movement coach Jermaine Browne for a motion shoot challenge, which was won by Jeana. They later had a couture photo shoot in the desert while posing with a parachute. Brendi K decided to quit the competition at panel. This marks the second time in America's Next Top Model history that more than one contestant decided to quit during the same season. Shanice received best photo during elimination, while Jeana and Kyla landed in the bottom two. As a result of Brendi K's departure earlier in the episode, both of them were allowed to stay.: Featured photographer: Pieter Henket; Special guests: Jermaine Browne
310	10	"Beauty Is Real"	March 13, 2018	0.53
The top six contestants attended castings in Los Angeles for Chris Mena and Maggie Barry. Kyla and Rio were chosen as the winners of the challenge and were given the opportunity to walk in a runway show for the designers as part of their reward. On set, the contestants had a cover try photo shoot for Paper magazine. At elimination, Rio received best photo. Erin and Shanice landed in the bottom two, and Erin was eliminated from the competition.: Featured photographer: Pieter Henket; Special guests: Chris Mena, Barbara Strasmore, Maggie Barry
311	11	"Behind the Beauty"	March 13, 2018	0.41
This episode featured behind the scenes and never before seen footage of the cycle, and highlighted each contestants journey to the top five.
312	12	"Beauty Is Personality"	March 20, 2018	0.78
The top five contestants had a challenge in which they had to create personalized avatars for the new America's Next Top Model mobile game. Khrystyana was chosen as the winner and received an assortment of clothes styled by Law Roach. The contestants were later taken to a mansion in order to shoot a music video with Maejor and Tyra Banks under the direction of Director X. At elimination, Khrystyana received best performance. Jeana and Rio landed in the bottom two, and Jeana was eliminated from the competition.: Featured director: Director X; Special guests: Maejor, David Ortis; Guest judge: Director X
313	13	"Beauty Is a Comeback"	March 27, 2018	0.74
The top four contestants took part in a throwback America's Next Top Model challenge inspired by the bubble runway from cycle 16. It was revealed that the contestants would be walking alongside the formerly eliminated contestants (except Liz and Brendi K.), one of whom would be replacing that week's eliminee at panel. Erin was chosen as the challenge winner, and along with Liberty, Christina, and Jeana, they moved back into the model house for the opportunity to possibly return. On set, the contestants had a photo shoot in pairs with cycle 3 winner Eva Marcille covered in tarantulas, shot by former judge Nigel Barker. At elimination, Kyla received best picture. Rio and Shanice landed in the bottom two, and Rio was eliminated from the competition. Out of the four comeback contestants, Jeana was chosen to return.: Featured photographer: Nigel Barker; Special guests: Stacey McKenzie, Eva Marcille
314	14	"Beauty Is Commercial"	April 3, 2018	0.22
The top four contestants took part in a challenge for Pantene in which they had to style their own hair and makeup. Khrystyana was chosen as the winner. On set, the contestants had to shoot an advertising campaign for Pantene, which required them to embody several different products from the brand. At elimination, Kyla won best photo. Jeana and Shanice landed in the bottom two, and Jeana was eliminated from the competition. In a shocking turn of events, she was saved from elimination by guest judge Philipp Plein, joining the other three contestants in the finale.: Featured photographer: Torkil Gudnason; Special guests: Kelly Vanasse, Danilo, Philipp Plein; Guest judge: Philipp Plein
315	15	"Next Level Fierce"	April 10, 2018	0.29
The contestants attended fitting for Philipp Plein at plein studio and after which Shanice is sadly eliminated from the competition after being in bottom 2 four times. The top three contestants Jeana, Kyla and Khrystiana took part in a photo shoot for the winner's spread to be published in the Paper magazine. They later reunited with the formerly eliminated contestants (except Brendi K. and Liz) for the final runway show and where they had to do some walks with some kids about positive body images. Immediately following the runway show, Khrystyana was eliminated based on the results from the photo shoot that had taken place earlier that week and Kyla and Jeana were the final two then the judges deliberated over the body of work of the final two, and at the end of the night, Kyla was crowned as the winner of ANTM.: Featured photographer: Vijat Mohindra; Special guests: Philipp Plein, Mickey Boardman, Stacey McKenzie

== Summaries ==
=== Call-out order ===
Order	Episodes													
Order	1 (Note: In episode 1, the pool of 26 girls was reduced to the final top 14 and were picked by Tyra. However, immediately afterwards, Tyra announced that the fifteenth girl–Erin–would also be part of the cast.)	2	3	4 (Note: In episode 4, Liz quit the competition before that week's judging panel and elimination, but Tyra said there is still going to be an elimination and Riyhan is eliminated.)	5	6	7 (Note: In episode 7, Brendi K., Jeana, Khrystyana, Kyla, Rio, Sandra and Shanice were part of the first ever septuple first call-out and Erin and Christina are in bottom two and Christina is eliminated.)	8	9 (Note: In episode 9, Brendi K. quit the competition during the judging panel. As a result, no one was eliminated, as Jeana and Kyla were part of a non-elimination bottom two.)	10	12	13 (Note: Episode 13)	14 (Note: In episode 14, Jeana was originally eliminated once again when she landed in the bottom two with Shanice, but was saved by guest judge Philipp Plein.)	15 (Note: In episode 15, Shanice was eliminated outside of judging panel after attending a fitting for Philipp Plein and didn't participate in the final judging with Jeana, Kyla, and Khrystyana.)
1	Brendi K. Christina; Coura; Ivana; Jeana; Khrystyana; Kyla; Liberty; Liz; Maggie; Rhiyan; Rio; Sandra; Shanice	Coura	Liberty	Khrystyana	Rio	Khrystyana	Brendi K. Jeana; Khrystyana; Kyla; Rio; Sandra; Shanice	Kyla	Shanice	Rio	Khrystyana	Kyla	Kyla	Kyla
2	Brendi K. Christina; Coura; Ivana; Jeana; Khrystyana; Kyla; Liberty; Liz; Maggie; Rhiyan; Rio; Sandra; Shanice	Rio	Jeana	Jeana	Khrystyana	Shanice	Brendi K. Jeana; Khrystyana; Kyla; Rio; Sandra; Shanice	Jeana	Khrystyana	Khrystyana	Kyla	Khrystyana	Khrystyana	Jeana
3	Brendi K. Christina; Coura; Ivana; Jeana; Khrystyana; Kyla; Liberty; Liz; Maggie; Rhiyan; Rio; Sandra; Shanice	Erin	Brendi K.	Christina	Shanice	Jeana	Brendi K. Jeana; Khrystyana; Kyla; Rio; Sandra; Shanice	Shanice	Erin	Jeana	Shanice	Shanice	Shanice	Khrystyana
4	Brendi K. Christina; Coura; Ivana; Jeana; Khrystyana; Kyla; Liberty; Liz; Maggie; Rhiyan; Rio; Sandra; Shanice	Jeana	Rio	Liberty	Sandra	Christina	Brendi K. Jeana; Khrystyana; Kyla; Rio; Sandra; Shanice	Erin	Rio	Kyla	Rio	Rio	Jeana	Shanice
5	Brendi K. Christina; Coura; Ivana; Jeana; Khrystyana; Kyla; Liberty; Liz; Maggie; Rhiyan; Rio; Sandra; Shanice	Khrystyana	Kyla	Brendi K.	Kyla	Erin	Brendi K. Jeana; Khrystyana; Kyla; Rio; Sandra; Shanice	Brendi K.	Jeana; Kyla	Shanice	Jeana			
6	Brendi K. Christina; Coura; Ivana; Jeana; Khrystyana; Kyla; Liberty; Liz; Maggie; Rhiyan; Rio; Sandra; Shanice	Christina	Christina	Erin	Brendi K.	Sandra	Brendi K. Jeana; Khrystyana; Kyla; Rio; Sandra; Shanice	Rio	Jeana; Kyla	Erin				
7	Brendi K. Christina; Coura; Ivana; Jeana; Khrystyana; Kyla; Liberty; Liz; Maggie; Rhiyan; Rio; Sandra; Shanice	Liz	Liz	Shanice	Jeana	Rio	Brendi K. Jeana; Khrystyana; Kyla; Rio; Sandra; Shanice	Khrystyana	Brendi K.					
8	Brendi K. Christina; Coura; Ivana; Jeana; Khrystyana; Kyla; Liberty; Liz; Maggie; Rhiyan; Rio; Sandra; Shanice	Kyla	Coura	Kyla	Erin	Brendi K.	Erin	Sandra						
9	Brendi K. Christina; Coura; Ivana; Jeana; Khrystyana; Kyla; Liberty; Liz; Maggie; Rhiyan; Rio; Sandra; Shanice	Ivana	Erin	Rio	Liberty	Kyla	Christina							
10	Brendi K. Christina; Coura; Ivana; Jeana; Khrystyana; Kyla; Liberty; Liz; Maggie; Rhiyan; Rio; Sandra; Shanice	Rhiyan	Khrystyana	Sandra	Christina	Liberty								
11	Brendi K. Christina; Coura; Ivana; Jeana; Khrystyana; Kyla; Liberty; Liz; Maggie; Rhiyan; Rio; Sandra; Shanice	Liberty	Sandra	Coura	Coura									
12	Brendi K. Christina; Coura; Ivana; Jeana; Khrystyana; Kyla; Liberty; Liz; Maggie; Rhiyan; Rio; Sandra; Shanice	Shanice	Rhiyan	Rhiyan										
13	Brendi K. Christina; Coura; Ivana; Jeana; Khrystyana; Kyla; Liberty; Liz; Maggie; Rhiyan; Rio; Sandra; Shanice	Sandra	Shanice	Liz										
14	Brendi K. Christina; Coura; Ivana; Jeana; Khrystyana; Kyla; Liberty; Liz; Maggie; Rhiyan; Rio; Sandra; Shanice	Brendi K.	Ivana											
15	Erin	Maggie												

The contestant was eliminated
The contestant quit the competition
The contestant was part of a non-elimination bottom two
The contestant was originally eliminated but was saved
The contestant was eliminated outside of judging panel
The contestant won the competition

=== Average call-out order ===
Casting call-out order, comeback first call-out and final episode are not included.

Rank by average	Place	Model	Call-out total	Number of call-outs	Call-out average
1	3	Khrystyana	36	12	3.00
2	2	Jeana	38	11	3.45
3	5	Rio	43	11	3.90
4	1	Kyla	50	12	4.17
5	4	Shanice	56	12	4.67
6	6	Erin	52	9	5.78
7	7	Brendi K.	49	8	6.12
8	9	Christina	38	6	6.33
9–10	10	Liberty	35	5	7.00
9–10	13	Liz	14	2	7.00
11	8	Sandra	53	7	7.57
12	11	Coura	31	4	7.75
13	12	Rhiyan	34	3	11.33
14	14	Ivana	23	2	11.50
15	15	Maggie	15	1	15.00

=== Bottom two ===
Episode	Contestants	Eliminated
2	Maggie & Brendi K.	Maggie
3	Ivana & Shanice	Ivana
4	Rhiyan & Coura	Rhiyan
4	Rhiyan & Coura	Liz
5	Coura & Christina	Coura
6	Liberty & Kyla	Liberty
7	Christina & Erin	Christina
8	Sandra & Khrystyana	Sandra
9	Jeana & Kyla	None
9	Jeana & Kyla	Brendi K.
10	Erin & Shanice	Erin
12	Jeana & Rio	Jeana
13	Rio & Shanice	Rio
14	Jeana & Shanice	Jeana
15	Khrystyana, Jeana & Kyla	Shanice
15	Khrystyana, Jeana & Kyla	Khrystyana
15	Jeana & Kyla	Jeana

The contestant was eliminated after their first time in the bottom two
The contestant was eliminated after their second time in the bottom two
The contestant was originally eliminated but was saved.
The contestant was eliminated in the final judging and placed third
The contestant was eliminated in the final judging and placed second.
The contestant was saved from elimination.
The contestant was eliminated outside of judging panel
The contestant quit the competition.

=== Photo shoot guide ===
- Episode 1 photo shoot: Avant-garde couture in a garden with coloful fashions (casting)
- Episode 2 photo shoot: Bohemian maternity editorial with fake belly
- Episode 3 video shoot: Trademark style in a mirrored room
- Episode 4 photo shoot: American Horror Story couture dresses in a haunted mansion
- Episode 5 photo shoot: Stacked beauty shots in groups with Ashley Graham
- Episode 6 photo shoot: Princesses with former RuPaul's Drag Race contestants (Manila, Valentina, Katya)
- Episode 7 photo shoot: Unretouched natural beauty in lingerie
- Episode 8 photo shoot: Dripping in gold body paints with plus-size male models
- Episode 9 photo shoot: Parachute couture in the desert with the blowing wind
- Episode 10 photo shoot: Paper magazine covers decades of fashion
- Episode 12 music video: Mansion madness with Maejor
- Episode 13 photo shoot: Posing in pairs with Eva Marcille covered in tarantulas shot by Nigel Barker like cycle 3
- Episode 14 photo shoot: Pantene shampoo hair campaigns
- Episode 15 photo shoot: Paper magazine 60s-inspired classic looks in red yellow and blue colors

=== Makeovers ===
- Ivana – Cut short
- Liz – Long bubblegum pink extensions with bangs
- Rhiyan – Nicki Minaj inspired super-long blunt chestnut brown weave
- Coura – No makeover
- Liberty – Dyed orange red
- Christina – Kylie Jenner inspired shoulder length lime green weave
- Sandra – Kim Kardashian inspired shoulder length bob
- Brendi K. – Buzz cut and dyed black; later, shaved on the sides
- Erin – Long wavy black weave
- Rio – Cut short and dyed platinum blonde with split eyebrow
- Shanice – Originally, Serena Williams inspired long curly weave; later, no makeover due to skin issues.
- Khrystyana – Dyed platinum blonde
- Jeana – Wig removed
- Kyla – Straightened and dyed dark brown

== Reception ==
The season received mixed reviews from critics, with several praising the return of Banks to her hosting position while describing the season overall as paling in comparison to earlier seasons. Bowen Yang and Matt Rogers, writing for Vulture, ranked the finale one star out of a possible five and remarked, "We had admittedly hopped off this show's bandwagon years ago, only to be lured back in with the promise that Tyra's return would set its course anew." Yang and Rogers concluded, "This is not a good reality show. Its characterizations of the contestants jumped all over the place as it went, it lost more than one contestant who felt emotionally unsafe, its judges (save Ashley Graham) were cartoonishly self-aggrandizing, and you could strongly argue that the best contestant, on paper and in our hearts, lost for no good reason at all." Joey Guerra of Houston Chronicle compared the season finale to a "limp balloon," while Scaachi Koul of BuzzFeed News noted, "ANTM lives and dies by Tyra Banks's energy," but remarked that "there's clear callousness in the show's attempt to become political."
