= Drew Elliott =

American businessman (born 1981)

- Born: April 27, 1981 (age 45); Bloomington, Indiana, U.S.
- Known for: Creative Director of Paper; Judge and Creative Consultant on America's Next Top Model

Drew Elliott (born April 27, 1981) is an American fashion business person. He was the Global Creative Director of MAC Cosmetics and a Creative Consultant on the reality television show America's Next Top Model. Elliott was the Chief Creative Officer at Paper. He studied pop culture and English at New York University prior to his job at Paper.

At Paper, Elliott was renowned for projects such as Kim Kardashian's #BreakTheInternet cover in November 2014. This fashion spread garnered over 50 million views on Paper's website. For his work at Paper and agencies like Ketchum Inc., Elliott was named the keynote speaker at Cannes Lions for "The Role of Technology and Marketing."

In 2016, Elliott spoke at Tedx on behalf of Estée Lauder and joined America's Next Top Model for Cycle 23. America's Next Top Model hired Elliott in 2016 to transform the show and make it appear more high fashion. In addition to serving as Creative Consultant, Elliott was a judge alongside supermodel Ashley Graham, celebrity stylist Law Roach, and British singer Rita Ora.

In 2017, it was announced that America's Next Top Model franchise creator Tyra Banks would return for Cycle 24, and that Elliott would remain as a judge. In (episode 3) of Cycle 24 on America's Next Top Model, Elliott revealed that he has vitiligo, an incurable disease that causes a loss of skin pigmentation.

In 2019, Drew Elliott was named Global Creative Director of MAC Cosmetics, leaving his post at Paper.

== See also ==
- LGBT culture in New York City
- List of LGBT people from New York City
- NYC Pride March
