= Khrystyana Kazakova =

Russian model

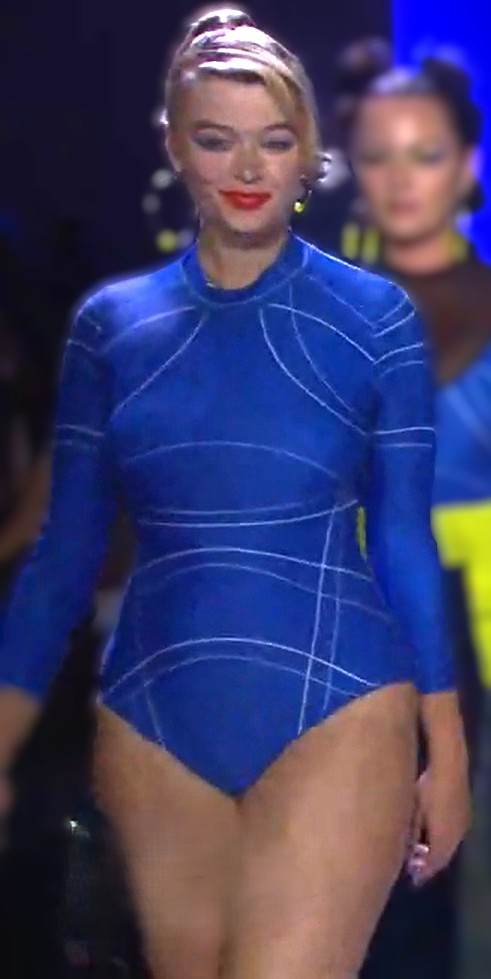
Kazakova walks the runway for Chromat at New York Fashion Week 2020

Khrystyana Kazakova (Russian: Кристиана Казакова; born 21 May 1985 is a Russian model, Playboy Playmate of November 2020, involved actively in the body positive movement.

== Early and personal life ==
Kazakova was born in Siberia, then she grew up in Ukraine. Her parents divorced when she was 15, where she stayed with her mother. Later on, her mother moved in with a Portuguese man who lived in Hawaii, since then she moved to the United States. She resides in New York.

== Career ==
Kazakova was the last eliminated contestant on the 24th season of America’s Next Top Model. In 2017, she is a founder and created The Real Catwalk, a series of fashion shows to celebrate all sizes and ethnicities. The shows have taken place in New York City and in London. In 2018, she also teamed up with photographer Peter DeVito to create “More Than Just a Trend.” The photo series address stereotypes about gender, diversity, and sexuality.

She has signed to be a model with One Management, Natural Models LA, Model Werk, Bridge Models and Nomad Management. Kazakova has appeared in ads for Warner's, Aerie, Ellos, Skims, Target and Khloe Kardashian's brand, Good American. She also featured as Playboy's November 2020 playmate.
