= Vijat Mohindra =

Indian American fashion photographer (born 1985)

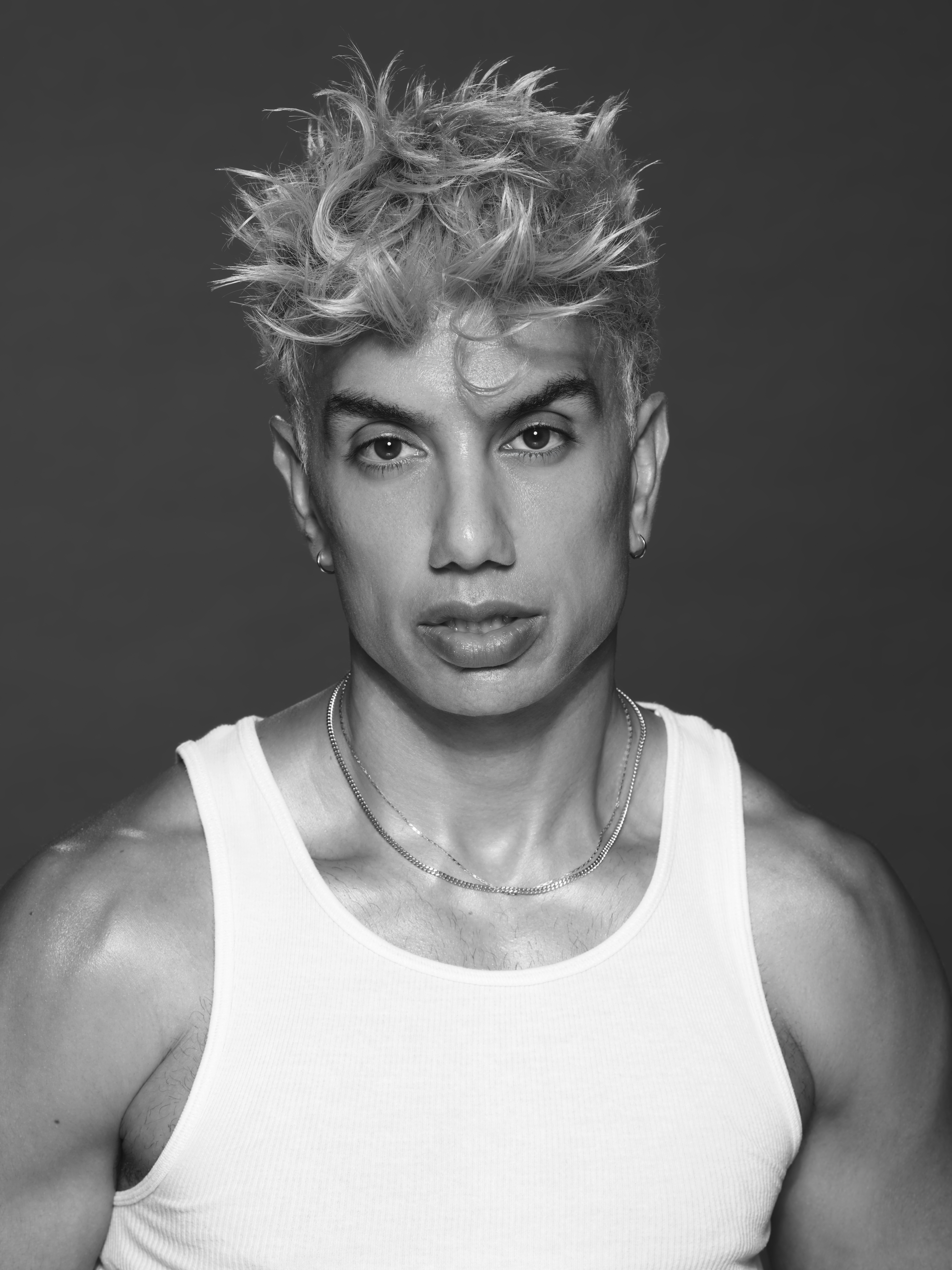
Vijat Mohindra

Vijat Mohindra (born 1985) is an American celebrity photographer and director, best known for his highly stylized celebrity portraiture and a surreal, hyper-saturated visual aesthetic. His work blends celebrity, high-end fashion, pop culture, advertising, and fine art, frequently featuring elaborately constructed sets, synthetic materials, and a nostalgic reference point to the mid-to-late 20th century visual culture. His celebrity portfolio notoriously features: Miley Cyrus, Kim Kardashian, Dolly Parton, Lady Gaga, and Rihanna, alongside a multitude of other public figures for magazine covers, editorial spreads, and advertising campaigns.

== Early life and education ==
Vijat Mohindra was born August 8, 1985 in Columbus, Ohio, but grew up in the suburbs of Chicago, Illinois. At the age of 18, Mohindra moved to Los Angeles to pursue photography where he graduated from Art Center College of Design in 2007 with a BFA.

== Style and Aesthetic ==
Critics and profile writers have described Mohindra’s visual style as “Neo-pop,” “ultra modernist,” and “hyper-synthetic.” His photographs typically favor highly saturated primary colors, and deliberately avoid organic or natural elements; Mohindra has said in interviews that he exclude plans and greenery from his sets to preserve an artificial constructed quality. Artillery Magazine characterized his work as “unapologetically commercial, plastic, image-conscious, and full of artifice,” noting his recurring interest in surreal and camp-inflected imagery alongside the subversion of established gender roles.

== Career ==
Mohindra has built a career photographing celebrity subjects for editorial and commercial clients. His photographs and magazine covers have featured Miley Cyrus, Paris Hilton, Nicki Minaj, Gwen Stefani, and Kim Kardashian, among others. His editorial work has appeared in publications including Paper, Gay Times, Attitude, Plastic, L’Officiel Italia, and in 2011 a shoot with Miley Cyrus received coverage in the Huffington Post. Trendland’s 2016 profile described him as “Young Hollywood’s favorite photographer.”

In 2016, Mohindra held his first international solo exhibition, Always Believe That Something Wonderful Is About to Happen, at Mars Gallery, running from November 5, 2016 to January 14, 2017. The show featured C-print photographs, including portraits of Amanda Lepore and the performer known as Amazon Ashley; the exhibition was reviewed by Artillery Magazine, which described its engagement with artifice, gender, and the uncanny.

== Exhibitions and other works ==
- Always Believe That Something Wonderful Is About To Happen (2016)
- Amanda Lepore
- High Gloss: The Art of Vijat Mohindra ISBN 9781419750243
