= Mickey Boardman =

Editorial director and advice columnist

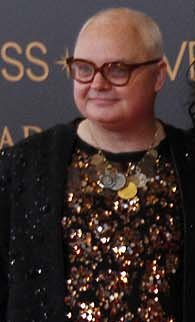
- Boardman in 2016
- Education: Purdue University; Parsons School of Design
- Occupations: Writer; socialite; philanthropist; media personality

Mickey Boardman is an American writer, socialite, philanthropist, and media personality. From 1993 to 2023, he served as an editorial director and advice columnist for Paper magazine.

== Life and career ==
Boardman was raised in Hanover Park, Illinois, and graduated from Purdue University in 1989, with a degree in Spanish. After school, he spent a year in Madrid, Spain teaching before moving to New York City to study fashion design at the Parsons School of Design.

Since 1993, he has written the advice column "Ask Mr. Mickey" in Paper magazine. His writing has also appeared in The New York Times Magazine, Out, and German Vogue.

Boardman is an active commentator on the New York social/fashion scene and has appeared as a cultural commentator, lifestyle expert, and fashion guru for networks like VH1, A&E, CNN, E!, and Fox News.

Boardman was recognized as one of New York magazine’s “Most Photographed Faces in New York” and voted by Fashion Week Daily as one of the most-invited people.

A philanthropist, Boardman has been active in many charitable efforts including Mr. Mickey’s Sidewalk Sale, Doctors Without Borders, Coalition for the Homeless, and Red Cross earthquake relief for Haiti and Chile.

Boardman is a dedicated supporter of Citta, a charity that builds schools, clinics and women's cooperatives in India and Nepal.
