= America's Next Top Model =

American reality television series (2003–2018)

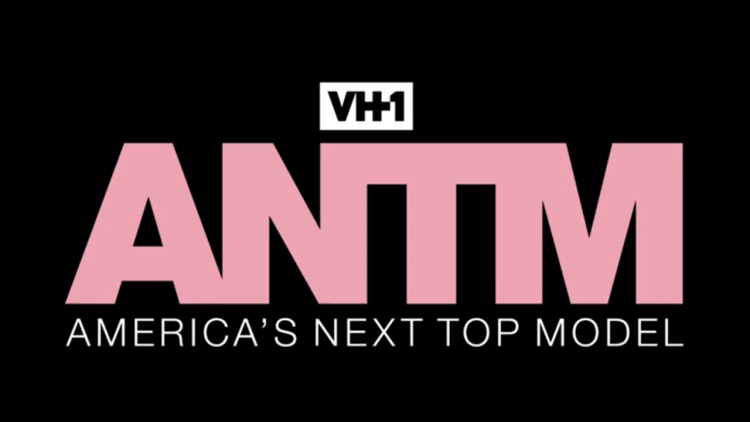
- Also known as: ANTM
- Genre: Reality television
- Created by: Tyra Banks
- Developed by: Ken Mok; Kenya Barris
- Presented by: Tyra Banks; Rita Ora
- Judges: Tyra Banks; Janice Dickinson; Kimora Lee Simmons; Beau Quillian; Nigel Barker; Eric Nicholson; Nolé Marin; J. Alexander; Twiggy; Paulina Porizkova; André Leon Talley; Kelly Cutrone; Rob Evans; Rita Ora; Ashley Graham; Drew Elliott; Law Roach; Jay Manuel
- Theme music composer: David Thomas; Les Pierce
- Opening theme: "You Wanna Be on Top" by Tyra Banks (cycles 1–16 and 19–22)
- Country of origin: United States
- Original language: English
- No. of seasons: 24
- No. of episodes: 315 (list of episodes)

Production
- Executive producer: Tyra Banks
- Producers: Ken Mok; Anthony Dominici
- Running time: 41–43 minutes
- Production companies: 10 by 10 Entertainment; Ty Ty Baby Productions (2003–2006); Bankable Productions (2006–2012); The Tyra Banks Company (2012–2018); Anisa Productions; Pottle Productions

Original release
- Network: UPN
- Release: May 20, 2003 – May 17, 2006
- Network: The CW
- Release: September 20, 2006 – December 4, 2015
- Network: VH1
- Release: December 12, 2016 – April 10, 2018

America's Next Top Model (abbreviated ANTM and Top Model) is an American reality television series and interactive competition in which a number of aspiring contestants compete for the title of "America's Next Top Model" and a chance to begin their career in the modeling industry. Created by Tyra Banks, who also serves as an executive producer, and developed by Ken Mok and Kenya Barris, the series premiered in May 2003, and aired semi-annually until 2012, then annually from 2013 to 2018.

The first six seasons (referred to as "cycles") aired on UPN, before UPN merged with The WB to create The CW in 2006. The following sixteen cycles aired on The CW until the series was first cancelled in October 2015. The series was revived in 2016, and it aired on VH1 up until the show's final cancellation in 2018. The series was among the highest-rated programs on UPN and was the highest-rated show on The CW from 2007 to 2010. Advertisers paid $61,315 per 30-second slot during the 2011–12 television season, the highest of any series on The CW. The first 22 cycles of the series and cycle 24 were presented by Banks, while cycle 23 was presented by Rita Ora. The series also employs a panel of two or three additional judges, a creative director, and a runway coach.

Cycles 1–16, 19, and 23–24 each consisted of a cast of 10–15 female contestants with no previous participation on the series. Cycle 17's cast consisted entirely of previous participants, while cycle 18's cast had seven new contestants and seven former Britain's Next Top Model participants. Cycles 20–22 featured male contestants in the contest, including two male winners. As of April 2018, 24 people have won the competition. Winners typically receive a feature in a magazine and a contract with a modeling agency, among other prizes. The series is the originator of the international Top Model franchise. Over fifty versions of the series have been produced internationally.

== Background ==
It was announced on January 24, 2006, that Top Model would be part of the new The CW network, a merge between UPN and The WB, when the seventh cycle started in September airing on Wednesdays. The series became the first series among regular programming to air on the network. Prior to the announcement of merging with The WB, UPN had committed to renewing the series through its ninth cycle on January 20, 2006, for which casting was conducted throughout mid-2006. America's Next Top Model was the only show left on the network that was originally from UPN.

On July 21, 2006, the writers of America's Next Top Model went on strike while working on cycle 7, set to premiere on the new CW Network in September 2006. The writers sought representation through the Writers Guild of America, West, which would allow them regulated wages, access to portable health insurance, and pension benefits. These benefits would be similar to those given to writers on scripted shows. The strike was the focus of a large rally of Hollywood writers coinciding with the premiere of the new network on September 20, 2006. The dispute was chronicled in a July 24 interview on the website Television Without Pity with Daniel J. Blau, a former recapper on the site who covered the series, and at the time was an America's Next Top Model show producer. In November 2006, the writers on strike were taken off payroll.

To celebrate its tenth cycle, America's Next Top Model aired a special installment called America's Next Top Model: Exposed in two parts on the CW on Wednesday, February 6 & 13, 2008. It reviewed the best catfights, mishaps and most memorable photo shoots, personalities, defining moments and contained other segments about the show since cycles 1 to 9, and featured a special opening fusing all three openings together. Camille McDonald (cycles 2 and 17), Toccara Jones (cycle 3), Eva Pigford (cycle 3 winner), Bre Scullark (cycles 5 and 17), Cassandra Whitehead (cycle 5), Joanie Dodds (cycle 6), Jael Strauss (cycle 8), Dionne Walters (cycle 8), Heather Kuzmich (cycle 9), and Bianca Golden (cycles 9 and 17) all returned to comment on events that happened in their or other cycles.

After announcing that the seventeenth season would be an All-Stars version, Banks said on The CW upfronts in May 2011, that there would not be a "normal" season of the show anymore. With the start of the eighteenth British Invasion cycle, the program converted to high definition, becoming the second-to-last primetime show on the five major English-language broadcast networks in the United States to make the switch, and the last to air in the regular season to do so.

The show is syndicated to NBCUniversal's cable division, with Oxygen as well as Style Network carrying the series, usually in marathon form throughout the daytime period on either network, and running through most of or an entire cycle. Bravo, MTV, and VH1 have also aired the series in the past. E! also currently airs reruns of ANTM.

== Format ==
America's Next Top Model's logo (2003–2015)

Each cycle of America's Next Top Model has 9–16 episodes and starts with 10–16 contestants. Contestants are judged weekly on their overall appearance, participation in challenges, and best shot from that week's photo shoot; each episode, one contestant is eliminated, though in rare cases a double elimination or no elimination was given by consensus of the judging panel. Makeovers are administered to contestants early in the season (usually after the first or second elimination in the finals) and a trip to an international destination is scheduled about two-thirds of the way through the cycle.

== Judges and other staff members ==
The series employs a panel of judges who critique contestants' progress throughout the competition. Throughout its broadcast, the program has employed seventeen different judges. The original panel consisted of Banks (who also serves as its presenter), Janice Dickinson, Kimora Lee Simmons, and Beau Quillian. Quillian and Simmons were replaced by Nigel Barker and Eric Nicholson in cycle 2, before Nicholson was replaced by Nolé Marin in cycle 3. After cycle 4, Marin and Dickinson were replaced by J. Alexander and Twiggy in cycle 5. Paulina Porizkova joined the panel in cycle 10, in place of Twiggy. After cycle 12, Porizkova was fired by Banks and the panel was left with three judges (Banks, Alexander and Barker) in cycle 13. In cycle 14, Alexander left the panel and was replaced by André Leon Talley, but continued as the series' runway coach. In cycle 18, Kelly Cutrone replaced Talley. After cycle 18, Banks fired long-standing cast members Barker, Alexander and photo shoot director Jay Manuel. Barker was replaced by Rob Evans in cycle 19, and Manuel by Johnny Wujek. Alexander returned to the panel in cycle 21 in place of Evans. For cycle 23 the entire panel, including Banks, was replaced with Rita Ora, Ashley Graham, Drew Elliott and Law Roach while Stacey McKenzie replaced Alexander as runway coach. For the 24th cycle, Banks returned as the main judge and presenter, replacing Ora, while the rest of the personnel remained unchanged.

In the first eighteen cycles, an additional guest judge was welcomed to the panel each week. For the nineteenth and twentieth cycles, public voting was represented on the panel by Bryanboy. For the twenty-first cycle public voting was simply presented on screen doing call-out.

Though not a judge, Jay Manuel served as the creative director during contestants' photo shoots for the first to eighteenth cycles. During the nineteenth and twentieth cycles, Johnny Wujek replaced Manuel as the creative director of all the shoots, and Yu Tsai replaced Wujek in the twenty-first and twenty-second cycles. Elliot served as both judge and creative director in cycle 23 and 24.

=== List of judges and other staff members ===
Judge/ Staff Member	Season (cycle)																							
Judge/ Staff Member	1	2	3	4	5	6	7	8	9	10	11	12	13	14	15	16	17	18	19	20	21	22	23	24
Hosts
Tyra Banks	Main	Main	Main	Main	Main	Main	Main	Main	Main	Main	Main	Main	Main	Main	Main	Main	Main	Main	Main	Main	Main	Main	Guest	Main
Rita Ora																							Main	
Judging panelists
Janice Dickinson	Main	Main	Main	Main	Guest	Recurring	Guest																	
Kimora Lee Simmons	Main																							
Beau Quillian	Main													Guest										
Nigel Barker		Main	Main	Main	Main	Main	Main	Main	Main	Main	Main	Main	Main	Main	Main	Main	Main	Main						Guest
Eric Nicholson		Main																						
Nolé Marin		Recurring	Main	Main								Guest												
J. Alexander					Main	Main	Main	Main	Main	Main	Main	Main	Main				Guest	Guest			Main	Main		
Twiggy					Main	Main	Main	Main	Main															
Paulina Porizkova										Main	Main	Main												
André Leon Talley														Main	Main	Main	Main							
Kelly Cutrone																		Main	Main	Main	Main	Main		
Rob Evans																			Main	Main				
Bryanboy																			Main	Main				
Ashley Graham																							Main	Main
Drew Elliott																							Main	Main
Law Roach																							Main	Main
Creative director
Jay Manuel	Main	Main	Main	Main	Main	Main	Main	Main	Main	Main	Main	Main	Main	Main	Main	Main	Main	Main						
Johnny Wujek																			Main	Main				
Yu Tsai																				Guest	Main	Main		
Drew Elliott																							Main	Main
Runway coach
J. Alexander	Main	Main	Main	Main	Main	Main	Main	Main	Main	Main	Main	Main	Main	Main	Main	Main	Main	Main			Main	Main		
Stacey McKenzie							Guest																Main	Main

== Series overview ==
Los Angeles has been the primary filming location of most of the seasons. The first three seasons of America's Next Top Model were filmed in New York City, along with seasons 10, 12 and 14; the latter three seasons were altered due to Banks's duties in The Tyra Banks Show, and 23.

Cycle	Premiere date	Winner	Runner-up	Other contestants in order of elimination	Number of contestants	International Destinations
1	May 20, 2003	Adrianne Curry	Shannon Stewart	Tessa Carlson, Katie Cleary, Nicole Panattoni, Ebony Haith, Giselle Samson, Kesse Wallace, Robin Manning, Elyse Sewell	10	Paris
2	January 13, 2004	Yoanna House	Mercedes Scelba-Shorte	Anna Bradfield, Bethany Harrison, Heather Blumberg, Jenascia Chakos, Xiomara Frans, Catie Anderson, Sara Racey-Tabrizi, Camille McDonald, April Wilkner, Shandi Sullivan	12	Milan; Como; Verona
3	September 22, 2004	Eva Pigford	Yaya DaCosta	Magdalena Rivas, Leah Darrow, Julie Titus, Kristi Grommet, Jennipher Frost, Kelle Jacob, Cassie Grisham, Toccara Jones, Nicole Borud, Norelle Van Herk, Ann Markley, Amanda Swafford	14	Montego Bay; Tokyo
4	March 2, 2005	Naima Mora	Kahlen Rondot	Brita Petersons, Sarah Dankelman, Brandy Rusher, Noelle Staggers, Lluvy Gomez, Tiffany Richardson & Rebecca Epley, Tatiana Dante, Michelle Deighton, Christina Murphy, Brittany Brower, Keenyah Hill	14	Cape Town; Robben Island
5	September 21, 2005	Nicole Linkletter	Nik Pace	Ashley Black, Ebony Taylor, Cassandra Whitehead (quit), Sarah Rhoades, Diane Hernandez, Coryn Woitel, Kyle Kavanagh, Lisa D'Amato, Kim Stolz, Jayla Rubinelli, Bre Scullark	13	London
6	March 8, 2006	Danielle Evans	Joanie Dodds	Kathy Hoxit, Wendy Wiltz, Kari Schmidt, Gina Choe, Mollie Sue Steenis-Gondi, Leslie Mancia, Brooke Staricha, Nnenna Agba, Furonda Brasfield, Sara Albert, Jade Cole	13	Bangkok; Phuket
7	September 20, 2006	CariDee English	Melrose Bickerstaff	Christian Evans, Megan Morris, Monique Calhoun, Megg Morales, A.J. Stewart, Brooke Miller, Anchal Joseph, Jaeda Young, Michelle Babin, Amanda Babin, Eugena Washington	13	Barcelona
8	February 28, 2007	Jaslene Gonzalez	Natasha Galkina	Kathleen DuJour, Samantha Francis, Cassandra Watson, Felicia Provost, Diana Zalewski, Sarah VonderHaar, Whitney Cunningham, Jael Strauss, Brittany Hatch, Dionne Walters, Renee Alway	13	Sydney
9	September 19, 2007	Saleisha Stowers	Chantal Jones	Mila Bouzinova, Kimberly Leemans, Victoria Marshman, Janet Mills, Ebony Morgan (quit), Sarah Hartshorne, Ambreal Williams, Lisa Jackson, Heather Kuzmich, Bianca Golden, Jenah Doucette	13	St. John's (Note: For season 9, all of the semi-finalists traveled by boat from San Juan to St. John's for casting week, before returning to the United States to start the competition.); Shanghai; Beijing
10	February 20, 2008	Whitney Thompson	Anya Kop	Kimberly Rydzewski (quit), Atalya Slater, Allison Kuehn, Amis Jenkins, Marvita Washington, Aimee Wright, Claire Unabia, Stacy-Ann Fequiere, Lauren Utter, Katarzyna Dolińska, Dominique Reighard, Fatima Siad	14	Rome
11	September 3, 2008	McKey Sullivan	Samantha Potter	Sharaun Brown, Nikeysha Clarke, Brittany Rubalcaba, Hannah White, Isis King, Clark Gilmer, Lauren Brie Harding, Joslyn Pennywell, Sheena Sakai, Elina Ivanova, Marjorie Conrad, Analeigh Tipton	14	Amsterdam
12	March 4, 2009	Teyona Anderson	Allison Harvard	Isabella Falk, Jessica Santiago, Nijah Harris, Kortnie Coles, Sandra Nyanchoka, Tahlia Brookins, London Levi-Nance, Natalie Pack, Fo Porter, Celia Ammerman, Aminat Ayinde	13	São Paulo; Santos
13	September 9, 2009	Nicole Fox	Laura Kirkpatrick	Amber DePace (quit), Lisa Ramos, Rachel Echelberger, Courtney Davies, Lulu Braithwaite, Bianca Richardson, Ashley Howard, Kara Vincent, Rae Weisz, Brittany Markert, Sundai Love, Jennifer An & Erin Wagner	15	Wailea
14	March 10, 2010	Krista White	Raina Hein	Gabrielle Kniery, Naduah Rugely, Ren Vokes, Simone Lewis, Tatianna Kern, Brenda Arens, Anslee Payne-Franklin, Alasia Ballard, Jessica Serfaty, Angelea Preston & Alexandra Underwood	13	Auckland; Matamata; Queenstown; Rakino Island
15	September 8, 2010	Ann Ward	Chelsey Hersley	Anamaria Mirdita, Terra White, Sara Blackamore, Rhianna Atwood, Lexie Tomchek, Kacey Leggett, Kendal Brown, Esther Petrack, Liz Williams, Chris White, Kayla Ferrel & Jane Randall	14	Venice; Milan; Como; Verona; Orta San Giulio
16	February 23, 2011	Brittani Kline	Molly O'Connell	Angelia Alvarez, Ondrei Edwards (quit), Nicole Lucas, Dominique Waldrup, Sara Longoria, Dalya Morrow, Monique Weingart, Mikaela Schipani, Jaclyn Poole, Kasia Pilewicz, Alexandria Everett, Hannah Jones	14	Marrakesh; Essaouira
17	September 14, 2011	Lisa D'Amato	Allison Harvard	Brittany Brower, Sheena Sakai, Isis King, Camille McDonald, Bre Scullark, Kayla Ferrel & Bianca Golden, Alexandria Everett, Shannon Stewart, Dominique Reighard, Laura Kirkpatrick, Angelea Preston (disqualified)	14	Plaka; Santorini
18	February 29, 2012	Sophie Sumner	Laura LaFrate	Jasmia Robinson, Mariah Watchman, Louise Watts (quit), Candace Smith, Ashley Brown, AzMarie Livingston, Kyle Gober, Seymone Cohen-Fobish, Catherine Thomas, Eboni Davis, Alisha White (quit), Annaliese Dayes	14	Toronto; Macau; Hong Kong
19	August 24, 2012	Laura James	Kiara Belen	Jessie Rabideau, Maria Tucker (quit), Darian Ellis, Destiny Strudwick, Yvonne Powless, Allyssa Vuelma, Brittany Brown, Victoria Henley, Kristin Kagay, Nastasia Scott, Leila Goldkuhl	13	Ocho Rios; Montego Bay
20	August 2, 2013	Jourdan Miller	Marvin Cortes	Bianca Wilson & Chris Schellenger, Chlea Ramirez, Mike Scocozza, Kanani Andaluz, Jiana Davis, Phil Sullivan, Alexandra Agro, Don Benjamin, Nina Burns & Jeremy Rohmer, Renee Bhagwandeen & Chris Hernandez, Cory Wade Hindorff	16	Denpasar
21	August 18, 2014	Keith Carlos	Will Jardell	Ivy Timlin, Romeo Tostado (disqualified), Ben Schreen, Kari Calhoun, Matthew Smith, Denzel Wells, Mirjana Puhar, Raelia Lewis, Chantelle Young, Shei Phan, Lenox Tillman, Adam Smith	14	Seoul
22	August 5, 2015	Nyle DiMarco	Mamé Adjei	Delanie Dischert, Stefano Churchill, Ava Capra, Ashley Molina, Courtney DuPerow & Bello Sanchez, Justin Kim, Dustin McNeer, Hadassah Richardson, Devin Clark, Mikey Heverly & Lacey Rogers	14	Las Vegas
23	December 12, 2016	India Gants	Tatiana Price	Justine Biticon, Cherish Waters, Giah Hardeman, Krislian Rodriguez, Kyle McCoy, Binta Dibba, Marissa Hopkins, Paige Mobley, Tash Wells, Cody Wells, Courtney Nelson, CoryAnne Roberts	14	None
24	January 9, 2018	Kyla Coleman	Jeana Turner	Maggie Keating, Ivana Thomas, Liz Woodbury (quit), Rhiyan Carreker, Coura Fall, Liberty Netuschil, Christina McDonald, Sandra Shehab, Brendi K Seiner (quit), Erin Green, Rio Summers, Shanice Carroll, Khrystyana Kazakova	15	None

== Partnerships ==
America's Next Top Model was also connected with Banks' talk show, on which several contestants have appeared, most notably Natasha Galkina (cycle 8), who worked as a correspondent for the show. The show's stage was also used for the cycle 5 reunion show.

In 2008, Banks launched a new reality show inside the Tyra Show, called Modelville which featured past contestants Renee DeWitt (cycle 8), Bianca Golden (cycle 9), Dominique Reighard, Fatima Siad and Lauren Utter (all cycle 10) vying for a $50,000 contract with Carol's Daughter. The competition was ultimately won by Reighard.

The ANTM franchise released a clothing and accessories line based on the television show, which is sold at most Walmart stores. It ranges from cosmetic products to handbags.

=== Video game ===
A video game loosely based on the series, also titled America's Next Top Model, was released for the Nintendo DS and Wii on June 1, 2010. The game involves players playing as a model participating in a televised modeling competition while living in a mansion with the other models, though it does not feature any cast members from the television series, including Banks. It features customization options for hair, makeup, and clothing, and also allows players to engage in catfights with other models. For Common Sense Media, Christopher Healy gave the game three out of five stars, writing that it "does have a number of flaws" but that "one thing this game does very well ... is replicate the feeling of being on a reality show".

=== America's Next Top Model Dolls ===
The America's Next Top Model Dolls were a short-lived fashion doll line released by MGA Entertainment as a promotional tie-in with the show of the same name. The dolls were designed by MGA doll designer Lui Domingo and released in the fall of 2008.

The dolls came as a result of the legal battle between Mattel and MGA over their fashion doll rivalry between Barbie and Bratz. When MGA temporarily lost the rights to the Bratz dolls to Mattel, the company scrambled to come up with an emergency release line to replace Bratz in the meantime. The America's Next Top Model Dolls were the result, as a form of competition with Mattel's Top Model Barbie line that was released a year prior, but had no affiliation with this show. The concept art, sketches, and prototypes initially revealed 4 main characters, Sienna (a blonde-haired, blue-eyed Caucasian), Sydney (a brunette Asian), Paisley (a red-haired Caucasian), and Tascha (an African American). The Tascha prototype would not make it to production (but still be featured in all of the marketing), due to MGA's fears that the doll, being African American, would sell poorly, as black dolls have historically been known to be picked up in low quantities or not picked at all by stores and retailers if they believed they would not sell, especially if they're located in cities with a low black population. Resulting from the financial losses incurred from their legal battle with Mattel, the dolls would ultimately not feature the majority of the accessories that were advertised with them, likely a cost-cutting measure (which is also why Tascha was excluded from the doll line).

Only two waves would be released, Swimwear and Day-to-Night wear, all featuring only Sienna, Sydney, and Paisley. Four fashion packs were also released for the dolls, each featuring images of the four characters, including the never produced Tascha doll. The box for the dolls also made it clear under the logo that they were the only officially licensed dolls from the hit TV show, to differentiate them from Mattel's Top Model Barbie line. The boxes also featured before and after images of the dolls, in reference to the makeovers on the show, and the back of the box also included a backstory for each doll to show that they had multi-faceted personalities and dream careers besides modeling, to counter the accusations that the dolls would be poor role models for children. The dolls had proportions different to that of other MGA fashion dolls, with slightly smaller heads and more Barbie-esque bodies, with jointed torsos for posing and arms molded to be able to rest on their hips. The dolls also noticeably used leftovers from the Bratz line as part of their accessories, as the clothes were stitched from leftover Bratz clothing fabric, and the jewelry was simply repurposed from prior Bratz dolls.

The dolls were a financial failure, selling very poorly in spite of their association with the show (which had been declining in ratings by the time the dolls debuted), and were promptly discontinued after only two waves of dolls.

== Deceased contestants ==
- Eighth-placing finalist Mirjana Puhar (cycle 21) was shot and killed on February 24, 2015 in her boyfriend's home in Charlotte, North Carolina.
- Kimberly Rydzewski (cycle 10) died on December 19, 2016. She was 29 years old.
- On December 4, 2018 Jael Strauss (cycle 8) died at age 34 due to stage 4 breast cancer.

== Reception ==
=== Impact in pop culture ===
The show has been referred to in many series, such as ABC Family's GREEK, CBS's The Big Bang Theory, and Fox's Family Guy. It also had its own E! True Hollywood Story episode, featuring past contestants Ebony Haith, Giselle Samson, Elyse Sewell (all cycle 1), Adrianne Curry (cycle 1 winner), Camille McDonald (cycles 2 & 17), April Wilkner, Mercedes Scelba-Shorte (both cycle 2), Toccara Jones, Ann Markley, Amanda Swafford (all cycle 3), Eva Pigford (cycle 3 winner), Michelle Deighton (cycle 4), Brittany Brower (cycles 4 & 17), Naima Mora (cycle 4 winner), Ebony Taylor (cycle 5), Lisa D'Amato (cycle 5 & cycle 17 winner), Kim Stolz (cycle 5) and Bre Scullark (cycles 5 & 17) as well as judges & personals Janice Dickinson, Tyra Banks, Nigel Barker, J. Alexander, Jay Manuel, Ken Mok and Michelle Mock-Falcon. It covered the first five cycles and recently re-aired with a few added minutes of footage which cover cycles 6 to 10 and Stylista.

In 2009, Oxygen Network aired a series based on the show called Top Model Obsessed, featuring past contestants Lisa D'Amato (cycle 5 & cycle 17 winner), CariDee English (cycle 7 winner) and Bianca Golden (cycles 9 & 17).

Many credit America's Next Top Model for inspiring later reality television shows, most notably RuPaul's Drag Race. Kevin O'Keefe and Mathew Rodriguez noted that America's Next Top Model served as "the biggest inspiration" for the show and that season 1 of RuPaul's Drag Race was "a parody of a couple different reality shows ... but more so (of) America's Next Top Model". They explain that "Top Model was a groundbreaking reality show" and that "it crawled so that Drag Race could walk". They drew parallels between Tyra Banks and RuPaul as black people "who (have) been at the top of their field" and "play a persona" on their respective shows. They also compared the judging panels, comparing Michelle Visage to Nigel Barker as an "anchor main judge" who is "harsher in their critiques", although contrasted RuPaul's judges with Tyra's, stating that "RuPaul has never allowed a drag queen to sit on the panel the way Tyra would bring in either Janice Dickinson then Twiggy." Moreover, the "first mini challenge of the first several seasons of Drag Race used to always be a photoshoot" and season 6's photoshoot of jumping off a platform was "directly taken from a photoshoot in season 6 of ANTM, where they had to play fairy tale characters and jump" off a platform. Another "artefact" of Top Model's influence on the show comes from Drag Race's focus on runway, with season 8 contestant Kim Chi being "criticised for not having a model walk". Most importantly, America's Next Top Model "was one of the most queer shows on TV" with regard to the inclusion of Jay Manuel, J. Alexander and Benny Ninja on the judging panel and numerous openly LGBTQ+ contestants, most notably Isis King. It was "covertly queer enough to make the space on TV for something as queer as Drag Race."

=== U.S. television ratings ===
For the 2006–2009 and 2010–2011 television seasons, America's Next Top Model was the No.1 show in average viewers on The CW.

Each U.S. network television season starts in late September and ends in late May, which coincides with the completion of May sweeps.

Network	Season (cycle)	No. of episodes	First aired		Last aired		TV season	Timeslot (ET)	Season averages		
Network	Season (cycle)	No. of episodes	Date	Viewers (million)	Date	Viewers (million)	TV season	Timeslot (ET)	Season ranking	Viewers (million)	18–49 rating (rounded)
UPN	1	9	May 20, 2003	2.90	July 8, 2003	4.50	2002–03	Tuesday 9:00 pm	—N/a	3.66	1.9
UPN	2	11	January 13, 2004	4.90	March 23, 2004	5.89	2003–04	Tuesday 9:00 pm	122	6.26	3.0
UPN	3	13	September 22, 2004	3.60	December 15, 2004	6.50	2004–05	Wednesday 8:00 pm	108	5.04	2.4
UPN	4	13	March 2, 2005	5.08	May 18, 2005	5.11	2004–05	Wednesday 8:00 pm	106	5.11	2.4
UPN	5	13	September 21, 2005	4.77	December 7, 2005	6.44	2005–06	Wednesday 8:00 pm	113	5.18	2.5
UPN	6	13	March 8, 2006	5.26	May 17, 2006	5.86	2005–06	Wednesday 8:00 pm	113	4.94	2.4
The CW	7	12	September 20, 2006	5.26	December 6, 2006	6.19	2006–07	Wednesday 8:00 pm	112	5.16	2.5
The CW	8	12	February 28, 2007	5.36	May 16, 2007	5.86	2006–07	Wednesday 8:00 pm	112	5.28	2.5
The CW	9	13	September 19, 2007	5.22	December 12, 2007	5.50	2007–08	Wednesday 8:00 pm	148	4.78	2.3
The CW	10	13	February 20, 2008	3.81	May 14, 2008	4.75	2007–08	Wednesday 8:00 pm	168	3.93	1.9
The CW	11	13	September 3, 2008	3.51	November 19, 2008	4.84	2008–09	Wednesday 8:00 pm	140	4.00	2.0
The CW	12	13	March 4, 2009	3.92	May 13, 2009	4.31	2008–09	Wednesday 8:00 pm	142	3.88	1.8
The CW	13	13	September 9, 2009	3.24	November 18, 2009	3.69	2009–10	Wednesday 8:00 pm	108	3.81	1.8
The CW	14	12	March 10, 2010	3.66	May 14, 2010	3.77	2009–10	Wednesday 8:00 pm	109	3.70	1.7
The CW	15	13	September 8, 2010	2.84	December 1, 2010	3.36	2010–11	Wednesday 8:00 pm	122	3.47	1.7
The CW	16	13	February 23, 2011	2.25	May 18, 2011	1.81	2010–11	Wednesday 8:00 pm (1–8); Wednesday 9:00 pm (9–12)	133	2.52	1.2
The CW	17	13	September 14, 2011	1.96	December 7, 2011	2.39	2011–12	Wednesday 9:00 pm	142	2.42	1.1
The CW	18	13	February 29, 2012	1.17	May 30, 2012	1.42	2011–12	Wednesday 9:00 pm	151	1.52	0.7
The CW	19	13	August 24, 2012	1.09	November 16, 2012	1.34	2012–13	Friday 8:00 pm	141	1.72	0.7
The CW	20	15	August 2, 2013	1.55	November 15, 2013	1.29	2012–13	Friday 9:00 pm	163	1.66	Unknown
The CW	20	15	August 2, 2013	1.55	November 15, 2013	1.29	2013–14	Friday 9:00 pm	163	1.66	Unknown
The CW	21	16	August 18, 2014	1.11	December 5, 2014	1.16	2013–14	Monday 9:00 pm (1–6)	176	1.56	0.6
The CW	21	16	August 18, 2014	1.11	December 5, 2014	1.16	2014–15	Friday 9:00 pm (7–16)	176	1.56	0.6
The CW	22	16	August 5, 2015	1.15	December 4, 2015	1.16	2014–15	Wednesday 8:00 pm (1–8)	176	1.59	0.6
The CW	22	16	August 5, 2015	1.15	December 4, 2015	1.16	2015–16	Friday 9:00 pm (9–16)	176	1.59	0.6
VH1	23	15	December 12, 2016	1.28	March 8, 2017	0.86	N/A (Note: This season was not included outside of the regular TV network schedule, cable networks did not count.)	Monday 10:00 pm	N/A (Note: Not included in the official ratings list.)		
VH1	24	15	January 9, 2018	0.86	April 10, 2018	0.86	N/A	Tuesday 8:00 pm	N/A		

=== Criticism ===
Yahoo!'s Shine lifestyle website said the show contained cruelty and elements of humiliation, and that some critiques from the judges are "really cruel and cringe-inducing", claiming that the show "humiliates and degrades young women." The site created the list "10 reasons why 'America's Next Top Model' is bad for women, humans", citing such things as giving the contestants and women viewers unrealistic visions of life as a model, and "always espousing empowerment and female strength and then forcing the contestants into embarrassing scenarios far outside the realm of real-life modeling". One such scenario highlighted was when cycle 12's final two contestants "were made to wear bikinis so skimpy that the producers had to blur out Allison Harvard's butt cheeks", and performed a "creepily sexual mud fight," after which contestant and winner Teyona Anderson was "commended for taking her weave in her hand and whipping it around on the runway like a sexy feather boa."

Allure magazine criticized the show in its October 2006 issue, saying that ANTM "hasn't exactly produced any actual supermodels."

Ken Mok and Banks noticed that most of cycle 8's contestants were unusually heavy smokers. "Tyra and I understand the influence 'Top Model' has on a generation of young people, and we want to make sure we get the right message to our audience," Mok said, which then prompted the "green" theme of cycle 9.

The winner of cycle 9, Saleisha Stowers, was discovered to have been in a Wendy's commercial, on a catwalk in the cycle 6 show and an episode of Tyra Banks Show prior to her participation. The rules of the competition stated that a contestant must not have appeared as a model in a national campaign during the five years prior to the production of the cycle in which they participate. The CW network said she had revealed her role in the Wendy's commercial, and "after reviewing the commercial, it was determined that her appearance did not amount to 'modeling' experience, and therefore did not exclude her from participating in the show."

After filming cycle 10, the producers of America's Next Top Model were served with a lawsuit from Michael Marvisi, the owner of the loft used as the Top Model house. The lawsuit claimed that the contestants as well as the production crew caused an estimated $500,000 in damages to the loft. Marvisi claims the contestants engaged in food fights, made holes in the walls, caused water damage to the bathroom, damaged a $15,000 chandelier beyond repair, and caused $90,000 worth of damage to an electrical store. Also, the production crew was accused of damaging the flooring and making holes in the ceiling for lighting equipment.

==== Reality Check: Inside America's Next Top Model ====
In February 2026, Netflix released a three-part documentary series, Reality Check: Inside America's Next Top Model, which revisits the show's history and controversies through new interviews with former contestants, judges and producers, including Tyra Banks, Jay Manuel, J. Alexander, Nigel Barker and executive producer Ken Mok. The filmmakers have said that Banks participated as an interview subject but did not have editorial control over the final cut.

The series revisits a number of storylines that had already attracted criticism during the show's run. These include crime-scene themed photo shoots in which contestants posed as murder victims, "race-swap" shoots that darkened or lightened models' skin tones to portray different ethnicities, and challenges in which contestants were styled as people experiencing homelessness or eating disorders. Former contestants also recount being criticised for their weight, and some say they restricted their eating or felt pressure to change their appearance, while the documentary highlights footage of judges and producers commenting on contestants' bodies and suggesting cosmetic dental work.

A major focus of Reality Check is a storyline from the show's second cycle involving contestant Shandi Sullivan. On the original programme, her night out in Milan with a male model was framed as infidelity and led to an episode titled "The Girl Who Cheated". In the documentary, Sullivan says she had been drinking heavily, recalls only fragments of events in a hot tub, shower and bed, and describes herself as having been "blacked out", stating that she now believes she was unable to consent while cameras continued to film. In the same segment, Mok says the production approached the show as a documentary and describes the incident as a "story point", while Banks is shown discussing how the scene was edited for broadcast.

The docuseries also addresses other incidents discussed by former contestants, including Keenyah Hill's account of being groped by a male model during a shoot and of being repeatedly criticised for her weight, and Dionne Walters' claim that she was cast as a shooting victim in a crime-scene shoot despite the production being aware that her mother had been shot and paralysed when Walters was a child. Mok says in the series that using Walters in that way was "a mistake" and that he takes responsibility for it. These segments appear alongside discussions of other shoots and judging decisions from across the series.

Several interviewees in Reality Check say that appearing on the show did not translate into long-term modelling careers and that some agencies were reluctant to work with reality television contestants. One segment contrasts reported contestant pay and working conditions with estimates of Banks' earnings from the franchise. Other former contestants and former panelist Kelly Cutrone have publicly defended Banks in the wake of the documentary, emphasising the opportunities they gained from the show and expressing opposition to calls for her to be "cancelled".

Reviews of the series have noted both its exploration of early-2000s reality television and differing views on how far it goes in assigning responsibility for past harms. The Guardian described Reality Check as "a gripping, queasy watch" that shows Banks "confronting her legacy without quite reckoning with it", while ABC News wrote that the docuseries "feigns accountability" by foregrounding contestants' accounts but allowing Banks and producers to frame controversial decisions as products of their time. A Time magazine essay argued that the handling of Sullivan's storyline is the documentary's "most powerful indictment of reality TV" because of the way responsibility for her treatment remains diffuse two decades later.

Trade publications reported that the documentary was also commercially successful. Variety wrote that Reality Check recorded about 14.2 million views globally in its first week on Netflix and ranked as the platform's most-watched series worldwide during that period.

== Broadcast history ==
=== International broadcasts ===
America's Next Top Model is currently shown on TV internationally in 170 countries and regions, namely: Australia, the United Kingdom, Japan, Hong Kong, Macau, Taiwan and the whole of Southeast Asia (except Timor-Leste). The following table shows countries and regions that have aired this show:

The channels in bold also broadcast their own version of Top Model.

Country	Channel	First aired	Last aired	Cycle(s)	Episodes
Australia	**Fox8**	2004	present	1–21 (cycle 21 currently airing)	137
Austria	**Puls 4**	2009	2009	10	13
Brazil	**Canal Sony**	2004	TBA	1–17	TBA
Bulgaria	GTV	2005	2009	1–7	291
Bulgaria	BTV Cinema	2011	2011	8	291
Bulgaria	BTV Lady	2012	present	9–20	291
Bulgaria	Fox Life	2018	present	20–24	291
Canada	MuchMusic; CTV Two	2003 (Citytv); 2008 (CTV); 2012 (MuchMusic & CTV Two)	2011 (CTV)	All	All
Canada	MusiquePlus	2008	present	4–17	182
Chile	Canal 13	2010	TBA	TBA	TBA
China	CCTV-2	TBA	present	All	All
Estonia	Kanal 11; **Kanal 2**	TBA	2011; 2012	1–12 (Kanal 11); 1–13 (Kanal 2)	TBA
Finland	**Nelonen**	January 6, 2004	present	1–13	TBA
France	Téva; Direct Star; June	2005 (Téva); 2011 (Direct Star & June)	2007 (Téva); 2012 (Direct Star) present (June)	3–4 (Téva); 5–11 (Direct Star); 1–20 (June)	TBA
Germany	VIVA	2007	2011	1–8	TBA
Hong Kong	TVB Pearl	2003	TBA	All	TBA
Hong Kong	Channel V	2003	TBA	All	TBA
Hong Kong	**Star World**	2003	TBA	All	TBA
India	AXN	2015	Present	20–22	48
India	Colors Infinity	2017	Present	23–24	30
Italy	**Sky Uno**	2007	present	1–15	169
Japan	Fuji TV, TV Tokyo, YTV, Nihon Television, TV Asahi	2004(C1-5 Fuji TV), 2007(C6-9 TV Tokyo), 2009(C10-11 YTV), 2011(C12-13 NTV), 2011–present(C14 – present TV Asahi)	—	All	TBA
Latin America	Sony Entertainment Television	2004	TBA	1–17	TBA
Lithuania	TV6	TBA	TBA	1–13	150
Netherlands	Yorin; **RTL 5**	May 31, 2004; August 18, 2005	August 11, 2005 —	1–4 (Yorin); 4–21 (RTL 5)	202
New Zealand	**TV3**	2004	2010	1–13	300
New Zealand	Four	2011	2015	14–22	300
New Zealand	Bravo	2017		23	300
Philippines	Studio 23 (now ABS-CBN Sports+Action), ETC, **Star World**, Velvet	2004 (Studio 23 now ABS-CBN Sports+Action), 2006 (ETC), 2006 (STAR World), 2008 (Velvet)	2005 (Studio 23 now ABS-CBN Sports+Action), 2013 (Velvet)	All	TBA
Poland	**TVN**	September 8, 2010		1–13	
Portugal	SIC Mulher	2009	Present	7–22	TBA
Puerto Rico	WAPA-TV	August 17, 2009; May 20, 2011	September 8, 2010 —	1–14; 15–16	182 —
Russia	**Muz-TV**; **U**	February 1, 2010; September 17, 2012	September 27, 2019	1–20	All
Serbia	B92	August 1, 2012	present	2–7	TBA
Singapore	Channel 5	March 8, 2004	TBA	1–2, 4–13, 15–16	TBA
Slovenia	TV3 Slovenia	2010	2010	TBA	TBA
Taiwan	Channel V	2005	2009	3–11	141+
Taiwan	**Star World**	October 12, 2008	present	11, 13–21	141+
Ukraine	**Novyi Kanal**	2013	present	1 (cycle 1 is now airing)	26+
United Kingdom	**Sky Living**	2004	present	1–20	204
Vietnam	**Star World**	2009	2021	16–23	100+

The international versions of Top Model have generally been better received by critics. In an article for The Atlantic, Adrienne Raphel explained that "Oddly enough, it's the foreign Top Model spinoffs that are in the more direct business of producing working models, like Ksenia Kahtovitch and Alice Burdeu, not the beautytainment ... queens of ANTM."

Slate's Torie Bosch points out that the international versions "have retained what works best about ANTM—the in-house drama, the torturous makeovers, the ridiculous assignments—while skipping what's worst about it: hokey judge antics, outlandish veneration of Tyra, and sob-story contestants."

=== Spin-off ===
In October 2008, The CW announced that it had ordered a spin-off pilot of America's Next Top Model, titled Operation Fabulous. The proposed show would have starred ANTM creative director Jay Manuel and runway coach Mrs. J. Alexander as they travel the country to provide makeovers to everyday women. Tyra Banks and Ken Mok would have served as executive producers for the new show. However, The CW ultimately declined to pick up the show.

== Distribution ==
Until 2012, only cycle 1 had been released domestically on DVD. This is because the home video license was formerly held by UPN, and was distributed for them by Paramount Home Entertainment. Since the series is now independently produced, the video rights to the remaining cycles have, until recently, been open for acquisition (and therefore, the remaining seasons had yet to be issued on DVD or Blu-ray). However, on May 30, it was announced on the CW that cycles 2 and 3 were available to pre-order on DVD via new licensee CBS Home Entertainment. They are now available for purchase on Amazon.com. Additionally, cycles 4, 5, 6, 7 and 8 were also made into DVDs and sold on the website.

== Sponsors ==
For cycle 1, Revlon sponsored this show with the products and prizes. For cycle 2, Sephora replaced Revlon as the commercial sponsor. Through cycles 3–18, CoverGirl replaced Sephora as the continuation on products and prizes. For cycle 19, shoe retailer Nine West and Smashbox sponsored with campaigns, but the cosmetics sponsorship has ended. For cycle 20, Guess sponsored with a US$100,000 ad campaign for the winner.

== Contestants' crossover appearances ==
- In cycle 3, Taye Diggs from Kevin Hill appeared in the acting challenge. While Yaya DaCosta won the challenge, it was cycle 3 winner Eva Pigford who guest-starred on the show. She later starred on other UPN/CW shows such as Smallville.
- Naima Mora (winner of cycle 4), Kim Stolz (cycle 5), and Furonda Brasfield (cycle 6) were given guest-starring roles on episodes of Veronica Mars. Kim and Furonda's roles were cameos in the same series.
- CariDee English (cycle 7 winner), who won the acting challenge in Episode 9, guest-starred in an episode of One Tree Hill, and later had a cameo appearance in an episode of Gossip Girl. English hosted Oxygen reality TV series Pretty Wicked.
- For cycle 8, the acting-themed episode had Tia Mowry of CW's The Game give the girls a crash course in acting, although the "crossover" was limited to Mowry's appearance, as the challenge winner was not given a guest role as a prize. Instead, Renee DeWitt, who won the challenge, got a surprise visit from her husband and son which she shared with Dionne Walters, whose family also showed up for a surprise visit.
- Several other contestants have landed roles on other UPN/CW shows, such as Mercedes Scelba-Shorte (cycle 2), Ann Markley (cycle 3), Toccara Jones (cycle 3) and Cassandra Whitehead (cycle 5).
- Lio Tipton (credited as Analeigh Tipton) and Samantha Potter (both cycle 11) were featured in an episode of The Big Bang Theory which featured the main characters locating the top model house.
- At the E! News preshow for the 81st Academy Awards five contestants were featured modeling Oscar gowns: Ambreal Williams (cycle 9) and Saleisha Stowers (cycle 9 winner), Samantha Potter (cycle 11), Nijah Harris and Natalie Pack (both cycle 12)
- On May 12, 2010, Angelea Preston, Jessica Serfaty, and Simone Lewis (all cycle 14) appeared on a Jay Walking All-Stars segment on The Tonight Show with Jay Leno. On February 24, 2012, Brittany Brower (cycle 4), Bre Scullark (cycle 5) (both cycle 17), and Lisa D'Amato (cycle 5 and cycle 17 winner) appeared on a Jay Walking All-Stars segment on The Tonight Show with Jay Leno.
- On November 21, 2012, Allyssa Vuelma, Jessie Rabideau, and Kiara Belen (all cycle 19) appeared on a Jay Walking All-Stars segment on The Tonight Show with Jay Leno.
- Jenascia Chakos (cycle 2) appeared in 2010 in an episode of Wheel of Fortune.
- Lio Tipton (credited as Analeigh Tipton) (cycle 11) played Jessica Riley in the romantic comedy Crazy, Stupid, Love.
- Courtney Davies (cycle 13) appeared in the ABC Family TV series Pretty Little Liars as Quinn in a recurring role for 2 episodes in 2011.
- Leslie Mancia (cycle 6), Lisa Jackson (cycle 9), Aminat Ayinde (cycle 12), Nastasia Scott (cycle 19) and Shei Phan (cycle 21) all competed on Project Runway or Project Runway All Stars as models paired with a designer. Lisa (paired with designer Michelle Lesniak Franklin) was the winner of the 11th season of Project Runway.
- Hannah Kat Jones (cycle 16) has appeared on the Disney Channel show Austin and Ally.
- Nyle DiMarco (cycle 22) was a contestant on, and the winner of season 22 of Dancing with the Stars, dancing with Peta Murgatroyd.
- Will Jardell (cycle 21) competed on an online game called Sequester, which is produced by Audrey Middleton of Big Brother fame. Jardell also competed on, and later won, the thirty-second season of The Amazing Race with boyfriend James Wallington.

== Future ==
Since the conclusion of cycle 24, there has been speculation about the show's renewal for a 25th season. By May 2019, a year after cycle 24's conclusion, VH1 had still not announced any news about a renewal or a cancellation. Tyra Banks has expressed interest in a 25th cycle: "You know, we've done [24] cycles of America's Next Top Model, and I feel that we should at least end at 25." Multiple interviews with Banks have indicated that a new cycle was in the planning stages, but there have been no official announcements.

== See also ==
- List of America's Next Top Model contestants
- List of reality television show franchises
- America's Most Smartest Model (2007)
- Make Me a Supermodel (2008)
- Model Latina (2008)
