= Die Model WG =

Die Model WG may refer to:

- Die Model WG (Austrian TV series)
- Die Model WG (German TV series)
