= Modelville =

- Created by: Tyra Banks
- Country of origin: United States
- No. of episodes: 4

Production
- Executive producer: Tyra Banks
- Running time: 60 minutes

Original release
- Release: October 8 – December 1, 2008

Modelville was a spin-off reality series from America's Next Top Model which aired within The Tyra Banks Show. It featured five former contestants of America's Next Top Model who competed for a $50,000 spokesperson contract with Carol's Daughter.

== Show format ==
Similar to Top Model, the contestants all lived in the same house together, with the exception that they were allowed to keep their cellphones and had access to the Internet, allowing them to update their blogs each day to give their take on the process. Each model had to direct and star in her own 30-second commercial for Carol's Daughter. The competition was documented on the Tyra Banks Show on a biweekly basis, except for the finale, which aired almost a month after the penultimate episode.

== Episodes ==
=== Welcome to Modelville (Modelville 1) ===
Original Airdate: October 8, 2008

Each girl tells her story to Tyra. Bianca talks about how the airport fight caused her to worry a lot about her mother and skip some jobs, Dominique reveals that her boyfriend got someone else pregnant but they are working through it, Renee explains she moved into a dangerous L.A. neighborhood where a baby was shot, Lauren tells about not thinking she is beautiful and is having a hard time pursuing modeling since having to move back in with her mother, Fatima reveals she has been struggling financially due to only booking editorial jobs and hardly has any money to eat.

Tyra then reveals she selected each of the girls because their stories touched her and welcomes the founder of Carol's Daughter, Lisa Price, who tells the girls they will have to write, film and direct their own commercial to win a $50,000 contract as a spokesperson for the brand. Another surprise comes to the girls: they are moving into the competition house immediately.

=== Modelville 2 ===
Original Airdate: October 21, 2008

The girls move into their apartment, which is the same Flathotel suite where the Cycle 1 girls stayed America's Next Top Model, Cycle 1. Fatima and Lauren joke around about their old rivalry they had with each other on their cycle of Top Model. Fatima then leaves for a photo shoot with CosmoGirl. Renee, Bianca, and Dominique later go in town to shop for boots, but Renee, worried about her timing and feeling ill, gets back to the apartment in time. Dominique and Bianca end up being three hours late to a surprise yet scheduled meeting with Tyra, upsetting the producers. After that, Dominique breaks down and fights with Bianca, who doesn't understand Dominique's way of dealing with her own feelings.

Renee reveals she was physically and mentally abused by her father, prompting Lauren to reveal that she was raped by her grandfather. Bianca, confused about this, starts asking why their mothers "didn't do anything," upsetting Renee, who leaves the room shouting at Bianca that Bianca doesn't know what she is talking about. Throughout the program, Tyra interviews the girls as well as Renee's mother after the fight segment.

After a visit from the founder of Carol's Daughter, Lisa Price assigns the girls their products, and they begin to research for their commercials in various ways.

Contestant	Product
Bianca	Carol’s Daughter Candy Paint in Razz-Berry Beret, Cranberry Kiss, and Wild Berry
Dominique	Carol’s Daughter Lemon Ginger Mint Manicure in a Jar
Fatima	Carol’s Daughter Hair Milk
Lauren	Carol’s Daughter Love Butter
Renee	Carol’s Daughter Tui Hair Smoothie

Lauren and Dominique test their products out, Fatima visits the Carol's Daughter flagship store in Harlem, Bianca hits the web, and Renee goes straight to a conference held by Lisa Price. They later rehearse in front of the camera, with varying levels of success.

At the end of the show, the recently eliminated Cycle 11 model Lauren Brie Harding appears to talk about her "posing on a rope ladder" photo and her friendships she made on the show with Clark Gilmer and Isis King.

=== Modelville 3 ===
Original Airdate: November 5, 2008

The girls have a party with their friends that gets out of control when Lauren's friends are told that the bathroom is off-limits. The friends begin to trash the suite until Dominique states the party is over, after which the girls remove all the guests and are left to clean.

The girls enjoy some downtime, but Renee struggles with her husband's fear that she will leave him if she wins. Meanwhile, Bianca meets with Camille, whom she thinks is using her, but they work to resolve their issues. The girls are then sent to an industry party where Renee uses her networking skills while Fatima and Dominique struggle to make a good impression. Bianca, dealing with her family's response over her coming forward about the airport incident in episode 1, decides to spend the party in the car.

Renee and Dominique then go to Clear Talents to have a meeting with agents about modeling and maybe more. Lauren refuses to accompany them, not knowing whether her passion is modeling or drawing. They both receive positive feedback, but Dominique is told she has to move to NYC to pursue modeling, and she realizes that her finances just will not allow her to do so. Renee's husband appears on the show, and Renee states that she thinks he would be ready to move with her if she won.

The girls are then given a challenge to sell a cup in three minutes, and they are then judged by one another. Renee is praised by her roommates, while a tough Fatima tells Dominique that her facial expressions are distracting. Both Bianca and Fatima do not understand the three-minute time frame, and Lauren simply refuses to participate. On the show, Tyra reassures Lauren that Lauren is good with words and asks Lauren to sell a shoe "Lauren's way," which Lauren does by saying that the shoe can be used to shut up Dominique. Renee wins the challenge and a diamond necklace as a prize.

Then, Joslyn Pennywell is brought on stage, and Tyra commends her for not giving up, telling the audience Joslyn deserves applause. They then discuss Joslyn's modeling scam and how it emotionally affected her. Joslyn breaks down, but Tyra comforts her, wishing Joslyn the best of luck in her career.

=== Modelville 4 (Modelville Finale) ===
Original Airdate: December 1, 2008

After a recap of the events so far, we are shown footage of the girls doing a mock interview for Extra. Renee starts strong but makes a bad guess in answering a question, Dominique and Lauren cannot think of answers, Bianca is so nervous that she cannot help giggling, and Fatima manages to divert the questions she cannot answer. Fatima is crowned as the winner for this challenge and wins a pair of $1500 jeans.

Back home, the girls get an invitation from Shandi to a free mic. There, Renee reads about empowering women, and Dominique speaks honestly about her struggles, moving everyone. Lauren then does some performance art. It is revealed that she broke up with her boyfriend, John John, prior to the show, and he wants them to get back together. Feeling she is not the spokesmodel type, Lauren quits right before the commercial shooting. John John comes on the show and reveals they have gotten back together.

The girls then show their commercials. Renee is praised for her use of the touch but admonished for making it too sexual, saying "touch yourself" in order to make clear that the brand makes customers comfortable in their own skin. Fatima is praised for her movement, but her commercial comes off as too similar to an infomercial. Dominique's text receives positive feedback, but her facial and hand movements are distracting. Bianca is praised for using the Carol's Daughter tagline in her commercial, but her initial growl when mimicking a woman making faces in the mirror as well as her enunciation are criticized.

After that, the contestants are interviewed, receiving one last chance to impress Lisa. A teary-eyed Dominique makes her purpose clear; Renee promises to prove she can give "110%"; Fatima connects Carol's Daughter with her history of struggles; and Bianca says that, even though she has made some mistakes, she wants to show that she can do well with the brand. Lisa eliminates Bianca and Fatima, leaving Renee and Dominique as the two finalists. Tyra then pulls a curtain to reveal Dominique's picture and declaring Dominique the winner.

Dominique is overjoyed and cannot even put her feelings into words, but Renee runs out into the audience and breaks down. Meanwhile, Dominique delivers her winning speech. Tyra then interviews Renee, who states she put all her effort into the competition. Lisa reveals that the competition was so close that she would like Renee to work for Carol's Daughter as well, although Lisa cannot give Renee an additional contract. Lisa offers the audience and the viewers (by giving them the keyword Dominique) free shipping.

== Contestants ==
Contestant	Previous ANTM Cycle	Previous Place	Future ANTM Cycle	Height	Reason for competing on Modelville	Finish
Lauren Utter	Cycle 10	6th	—N/a	1.83 m (6 ft 0 in)	To get herself on track.	5th (Quit)
Bianca Golden	Cycle 9	4th	Cycle 17: "All-Stars"	1.83 m (6 ft 0 in)	In order to get back into the industry after losing many jobs due to the Nikki Blonsky incident.	4th
Fatima Siad	Cycle 10	3rd	—N/a	1.80 m (5 ft 11 in)	To become Carol's Daughter spokesperson, support her family, and help further her career.	3rd
Renee Alway	Cycle 8	3rd	—N/a	1.80 m (5 ft 11 in)	To win the money and move to New York with her family.	Runner-up
Dominique Reighard	Cycle 10	4th	Cycle 17: "All-Stars"	1.80 m (5 ft 11 in)	To become Carol's Daughter's spokesperson and explore opportunities in New York City.	Winner

== Results ==
Unlike on America's Next Top Model, eliminations only took place during the finale and not at the end of every episode.

	1	2	3	4	
Dominique	IN	LOW	IN	IN	WINNER
Renee	IN	IN	WIN	IN	RUNNER-UP
Fatima	IN	IN	IN	WIN	OUT
Bianca	IN	LOW	IN	IN	OUT
Lauren	IN	IN	LOW	QUIT	

The contestant did not participate in the challenge
The contestant won the reward challenge
The contestant quit the competition
The contestant was eliminated
The contestant won the competition

There were no reward challenges in episodes 1 and 2. However, in episode 2, Tyra originally had planned a challenge for the girls but cancelled it due to Bianca and Dominique's absence.

== International adaptations ==
The shows format was adapted in Austria under the name Die Model WG (The Model Community) in early 2009. In 2010, a German version of the same name followed featuring mostly contestants from Germany's Next Topmodel.
