= List of America's Next Top Model episodes =

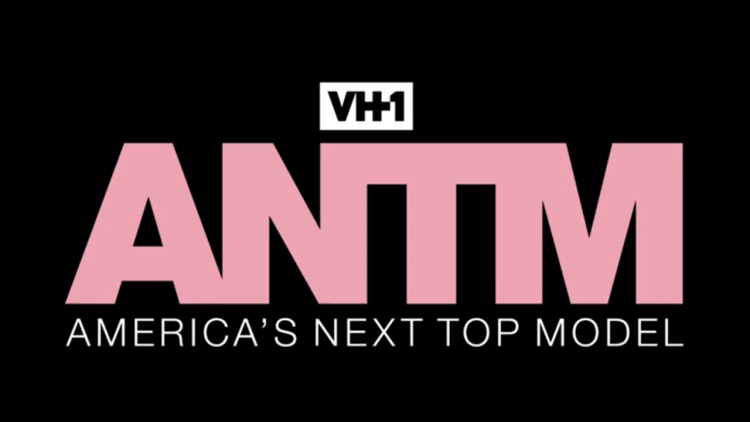

America's Next Top Model (abbreviated ANTM and Top Model) is an American reality television series and interactive competition in which a number of aspiring models compete for the title of "America's Next Top Model" and a chance to begin their career in the modeling industry. Created by Tyra Banks, who also serves as an executive producer, and developed by Ken Mok and Kenya Barris. Banks also serves as host for most of the series, Rita Ora has hosted once in the series. It premiered in May 2003, and aired semiannually until 2012, then annually from 2013. The first six seasons (referred to as "cycles") aired on UPN, before UPN merged with The WB to create The CW in 2006. The following sixteen cycles aired on The CW until the series was first cancelled in October 2015. The series was revived in 2016 and aired on VH1 for two more cycles. The series was among the highest-rated programs on UPN and was the highest-rated show on The CW from 2007 to 2010.

As of April 10, 2018, 315 episodes of America's Next Top Model have aired, including six specials, concluding the twenty-fourth season.

== Series overview ==
| Season | Presenter | Episodes | Originally released | | |
| Season | Presenter | Episodes | First released | Last released | Network |
|---|---|---|---|---|---|
| 1 | Tyra Banks | 9 | May 20, 2003 | July 15, 2003 | UPN |
| 2 | Tyra Banks | 11 | January 13, 2004 | March 16, 2004 | UPN |
| 3 | Tyra Banks | 13 | September 22, 2004 | December 15, 2004 | UPN |
| 4 | Tyra Banks | 13 | March 2, 2005 | May 18, 2005 | UPN |
| 5 | Tyra Banks | 13 | September 21, 2005 | December 7, 2005 | UPN |
| 6 | Tyra Banks | 13 | March 8, 2006 | May 17, 2006 | UPN |
| 7 | Tyra Banks | 12 | September 20, 2006 | December 6, 2006 | The CW |
| 8 | Tyra Banks | 12 | February 28, 2007 | May 16, 2007 | The CW |
| 9 | Tyra Banks | 13 | September 19, 2007 | December 12, 2007 | The CW |
| 10 | Tyra Banks | 13 | February 20, 2008 | May 14, 2008 | The CW |
| 11 | Tyra Banks | 13 | September 3, 2008 | November 19, 2008 | The CW |
| 12 | Tyra Banks | 13 | March 4, 2009 | May 13, 2009 | The CW |
| 13 | Tyra Banks | 13 | September 9, 2009 | November 18, 2009 | The CW |
| 14 | Tyra Banks | 12 | March 10, 2010 | May 19, 2010 | The CW |
| 15 | Tyra Banks | 13 | September 8, 2010 | December 1, 2010 | The CW |
| 16 | Tyra Banks | 13 | February 23, 2011 | May 18, 2011 | The CW |
| 17 | Tyra Banks | 13 | September 14, 2011 | December 7, 2011 | The CW |
| 18 | Tyra Banks | 13 | February 29, 2012 | May 30, 2012 | The CW |
| 19 | Tyra Banks | 13 | August 24, 2012 | November 16, 2012 | The CW |
| 20 | Tyra Banks | 15 | August 2, 2013 | November 15, 2013 | The CW |
| 21 | Tyra Banks | 16 | August 18, 2014 | December 5, 2014 | The CW |
| 22 | Tyra Banks | 16 | August 5, 2015 | December 4, 2015 | The CW |
| 23 | Rita Ora | 15 | December 12, 2016 | March 8, 2017 | VH1 |
| 24 | Tyra Banks | 15 | January 9, 2018 | April 10, 2018 | VH1 |

== Episodes ==
=== Cycle 1 (2003) ===
| No. overall | No. in season | Title | Original release date | US viewers (millions) |
|---|---|---|---|---|
| 1 | 1 | "The Girl Who Wants It Bad" | May 20, 2003 | 2.92 |
| 2 | 2 | "The Girl is Here to Win, Not Make Friends" | May 27, 2003 | 3.20 |
| 3 | 3 | "The Girl Who Gets Rushed to the Emergency Room" | June 3, 2003 | 4.13 |
| 4 | 4 | "The Girl Who Drives Everyone Crazy" | June 10, 2003 | 3.38 |
| 5 | 5 | "The Girl Who Everyone Thinks is Killing Herself" | June 17, 2003 | 3.45 |
| 6 | 6 | "The Girl Who Deals With a Pervert" | June 24, 2003 | 3.40 |
| 7 | 7 | "The Girls Get Really Naked" | July 1, 2003 | 4.42 |
| 8 | 8 | "How the Girls Got Here" | July 8, 2003 | 2.43 |
| 9 | 9 | "The Girl Who Becomes America's Next Top Model" | July 8, 2003 | 4.47 |

=== Cycle 2 (2004) ===
| No. overall | No. in season | Title | Original release date | US viewers (millions) |
|---|---|---|---|---|
| 10 | 1 | "The Girl Who Overslept" | January 13, 2004 | 4.90 |
| 11 | 2 | "The Girl Who Floats Like a Butterfly and Stings Like a Bee" | January 20, 2004 | 4.93 |
| 12 | 3 | "The Girl Who Can Cry at the Drop of a Hat" | January 27, 2004 | 7.11 |
| 13 | 4 | "The Girl Who Needs Six Months of Modeling School" | February 3, 2004 | 6.96 |
| 14 | 5 | "The Girl Who is a Visual Orgasm" | February 10, 2004 | 7.13 |
| 15 | 6 | "The Girl Whose Lip Puffed Up" | February 17, 2004 | 6.41 |
| 16 | 7 | "The Girl Who is Dripping With Hypocrisy" | February 24, 2004 | 7.64 |
| 17 | 8 | "The Girl With a Signature Walk" | March 2, 2004 | 6.58 |
| 18 | 9 | "The Girl Who is Afraid of Snakes" | March 9, 2004 | 5.66 |
| 19 | 10 | "The Girl Who Cheated" | March 16, 2004 | 5.69 |
| 20 | 11 | "The Girl Who is America's Next Top Model" | March 23, 2004 | 5.89 |

=== Cycle 3 (2004) ===
| No. overall | No. in season | Title | Original release date | US viewers (millions) |
|---|---|---|---|---|
| 21 | 1 | "The Girl With the Secret" | September 22, 2004 | 3.62 |
| 22 | 2 | "The Girl Who is Codependent" | September 29, 2004 | 4.36 |
| 23 | 3 | "The Girl Everyone Thinks is a Backstabber" | October 6, 2004 | 5.06 |
| 24 | 4 | "The Girl Who Sets a Trap" | October 13, 2004 | 4.80 |
| 25 | 5 | "The Girl Who Cries When She Looks in the Mirror" | October 20, 2004 | 5.07 |
| 26 | 6 | "The Girl Who Mutilated the Precious Brownies" | October 27, 2004 | 5.05 |
| 27 | 7 | "The Girl Who Forgot Her Shoes" | November 3, 2004 | 5.67 |
| 28 | 8 | "The Girl Who is Panic-Stricken" | November 10, 2004 | 5.60 |
| 29 | 9 | "The Girl Meets Taye Diggs" | November 17, 2004 | 5.11 |
| 30 | 10 | "The Girl Who Goes Ballistic" | November 24, 2004 | 4.54 |
| 31 | 11 | "The Girl the Lionesses are Hunting" | December 1, 2004 | 4.90 |
| 32 | 12 | "The Girl Who Didn't Hug Goodbye" | December 8, 2004 | 5.20 |
| 33 | 13 | "The Girl Who Wins it All" | December 15, 2004 | 6.47 |

=== Cycle 4 (2005) ===
| No. overall | No. in season | Title | Original release date | US viewers (millions) |
|---|---|---|---|---|
| 34 | 1 | "The Girl Who is a Lady Kat... Reow!" | March 2, 2005 | 5.08 |
| 35 | 2 | "The Girls Who Hate Their Makeovers" | March 9, 2005 | 5.12 |
| 36 | 3 | "The Girl Who Suddenly Collapsed" | March 16, 2005 | 5.24 |
| 37 | 4 | "The Girl With the Worst Photo in History" | March 23, 2005 | 4.74 |
| 38 | 5 | "The Girl Who is Contagious" | March 30, 2005 | 5.56 |
| 39 | 6 | "The Girl With the Deliciously Tacky Dance" | April 6, 2005 | 4.34 |
| 40 | 7 | "The Girl Who Pushes Tyra Over the Edge" | April 13, 2005 | 5.49 |
| 41 | 8 | "The Girl Who Gets Bad News" | April 20, 2005 | 4.28 |
| 42 | 9 | "The Girls the Lionesses are Hunting" | April 27, 2005 | 4.91 |
| 43 | 10 | "The Girl Who Flops in the Mud" | May 4, 2005 | 4.94 |
| 44 | 11 | "The Girl Who is Special" | May 11, 2005 | 5.54 |
| 45 | 12 | "What the Girls Did That You've Never Seen Before" | May 17, 2005 | 2.70 |
| 46 | 13 | "The Girl Who Walks on Water" | May 18, 2005 | 6.07 |

=== Cycle 5 (2005) ===
| No. overall | No. in season | Title | Original release date | US viewers (millions) |
|---|---|---|---|---|
| 47 | 1 | "The Girl With the Twisted Catchphrase" | September 21, 2005 | 4.77 |
| 48 | 2 | "The Girls Become Superheroes" | September 21, 2005 | 4.77 |
| 49 | 3 | "The Girl Who Needs a Miracle" | September 28, 2005 | 4.52 |
| 50 | 4 | "The Girl Who Makes a Disclaimer" | October 5, 2005 | 4.81 |
| 51 | 5 | "The Girl Who Gets a Boob Job" | October 12, 2005 | 5.47 |
| 52 | 6 | "The Girl Who Loves Bubbles and Talk to Plants" | October 19, 2005 | 5.45 |
| 53 | 7 | "The Girls Who Are 1940s Pin-Ups" | October 26, 2005 | 5.48 |
| 54 | 8 | "The Girl Who Wants to Step on a Pretty Flower" | November 2, 2005 | 4.65 |
| 55 | 9 | "The Girl Whose Boyfriend Is Cheating on Her" | November 9, 2005 | 5.54 |
| 56 | 10 | "The Girl Who Talks Behind Everyone's Back" | November 16, 2005 | 5.53 |
| 57 | 11 | "The Girl Who Retaliates" | November 23, 2005 | 4.72 |
| 58 | 12 | "The Girl Who Takes a Pill" | November 30, 2005 | 5.23 |
| 59 | 13 | "The Girl Who Is on the Cover" | December 7, 2005 | 6.44 |

=== Cycle 6 (2006) ===
| No. overall | No. in season | Title | Original release date | US viewers (millions) |
|---|---|---|---|---|
| 60 | 1 | "The Girl Who Learns How to Dance" | March 8, 2006 | 5.26 |
| 61 | 2 | "The Girls Go Bald" | March 8, 2006 | 5.26 |
| 62 | 3 | "The Girl Who is a True Miss Diva" | March 15, 2006 | 4.87 |
| 63 | 4 | "The Girl Who Kissed a Roach" | March 22, 2006 | 5.21 |
| 64 | 5 | "The Girl Who Kissed a Male Model" | March 29, 2006 | 4.86 |
| 65 | 6 | "The Girl With Two Bad Takes" | April 5, 2006 | 5.10 |
| 66 | 7 | "The Girl Who Has a Temper" | April 12, 2006 | 4.40 |
| 67 | 8 | "The Girl Who Has Surgery" | April 19, 2006 | 4.36 |
| 68 | 9 | "The Girl Who Is a Model, Not a Masseuse" | April 26, 2006 | 4.89 |
| 69 | 10 | "The Girl Who is Going to the Moon" | April 26, 2006 | 3.37 |
| 70 | 11 | "The Girl Who is Rushed to the Emergency Room" | May 3, 2006 | 4.29 |
| 71 | 12 | "The Girls Go to Phuket" | May 10, 2006 | 4.85 |
| 72 | 13 | "The Girl Who Walked Through the Ancient City" | May 17, 2006 | 5.86 |

=== Cycle 7 (2006) ===
| No. overall | No. in season | Title | Original release date | US viewers (millions) |
|---|---|---|---|---|
| 73 | 1 | "The Girl Who Marks Her Territory" | September 20, 2006 | 5.26 |
| 74 | 2 | "The Girl Who Hates Her Hair" | September 27, 2006 | 4.68 |
| 75 | 3 | "The Girl Who Goes to Texas" | October 4, 2006 | 5.25 |
| 76 | 4 | "The Girl Who Joined the Circus" | October 11, 2006 | 5.50 |
| 77 | 5 | "The Girl Who Punk'd Ashton" | October 18, 2006 | 5.15 |
| 78 | 6 | "The Girl Who Graduates" | October 25, 2006 | 5.45 |
| 79 | 7 | "The Girls Who Made it This Far" | November 1, 2006 | 4.41 |
| 80 | 8 | "The Girl Who Wrecks the Car" | November 8, 2006 | 5.37 |
| 81 | 9 | "The Girl Who Breaks Down" | November 15, 2006 | 4.71 |
| 82 | 10 | "The Girl Who Sticks Her Foot in Mouth" | November 22, 2006 | 4.07 |
| 83 | 11 | "The Girl Who Grates" | November 29, 2006 | 5.73 |
| 84 | 12 | "The Girl Who Becomes America's Next Top Model" | December 6, 2006 | 6.19 |

=== Cycle 8 (2007) ===
| No. overall | No. in season | Title | Original release date | US viewers (millions) |
|---|---|---|---|---|
| 85 | 1 | "The Girl Who Won't Stop Talking" | February 28, 2007 | 5.36 |
| 86 | 2 | "The Girls Go to Prom" | March 7, 2007 | 4.46 |
| 87 | 3 | "The Girl Who Cries all the Time" | March 14, 2007 | 5.16 |
| 88 | 4 | "The Girl Who Changes Her Attitude" | March 21, 2007 | 5.04 |
| 89 | 5 | "The Girl Who Takes Credit" | March 28, 2007 | 5.32 |
| 90 | 6 | "The Girl Who Gets Thrown in the Pool" | April 4, 2007 | 5.22 |
| 91 | 7 | "The Girl Who Impresses Pedro" | April 11, 2007 | 5.65 |
| 92 | 8 | "The Girls Go Down Under" | April 18, 2007 | 5.20 |
| 93 | 9 | "The Girl Who Picks a Fight" | April 25, 2007 | 3.87 |
| 94 | 10 | "The Girl Who Blames the Taxi Driver" | May 2, 2007 | 5.23 |
| 95 | 11 | "The Girl Who Does Not Want to Dance" | May 9, 2007 | 4.92 |
| 96 | 12 | "The Girl Who Becomes America's Next Top Model" | May 16, 2007 | 6.42 |

=== Cycle 9 (2007) ===
| No. overall | No. in season | Title | Original release date | US viewers (millions) |
|---|---|---|---|---|
| 97 | 1 | "The Girls Go Cruisin'" | September 19, 2007 | 5.22 |
| 98 | 2 | "The Models Go Green" | September 26, 2007 | 4.90 |
| 99 | 3 | "The Girls Go Rock Climbing" | October 3, 2007 | 4.54 |
| 100 | 4 | "The Girl Who Goes Bald" | October 10, 2007 | 5.37 |
| 101 | 5 | "The Girl Who is Afraid of Heights" | October 17, 2007 | 4.94 |
| 102 | 6 | "The Girl Who Gets a Mango" | October 24, 2007 | 4.74 |
| 103 | 7 | "The Girl Who Runs Into the Glass Door" | October 31, 2007 | 3.24 |
| 104 | 8 | "The Girls Who Crawl" | November 7, 2007 | 5.10 |
| 105 | 9 | "The Girl Who Starts to Lose Her Cool" | November 14, 2007 | 5.34 |
| 106 | 10 | "The Girls Going to Shanghai" | November 21, 2007 | 3.64 |
| 107 | 11 | "The Girls Go on Go-See Adventures" | November 28, 2007 | 5.04 |
| 108 | 12 | "The Girls Go to the Great Wall" | December 5, 2007 | 4.63 |
| 109 | 13 | "The Girl Who Becomes America's Next Top Model" | December 12, 2007 | 5.50 |

=== Cycle 10 (2008) ===
| No. overall | No. in season | Title | Original release date | US viewers (millions) |
|---|---|---|---|---|
| 110 | 1 | "Welcome to the Top Model Prep" | February 20, 2008 | 3.81 |
| 111 | 2 | "New York City, Here we Come" | February 27, 2008 | 3.82 |
| 112 | 3 | "Top Model Makeovers" | March 5, 2008 | 3.52 |
| 113 | 4 | "Where's The Beef?" | March 12, 2008 | 3.65 |
| 114 | 5 | "Top Model Takes it On the Streets" | March 19, 2008 | 3.79 |
| 115 | 6 | "House of Pain" | March 26, 2008 | 3.53 |
| 116 | 7 | "If You Can't Make it Here, You Can't Make it Anywhere" | April 2, 2008 | 3.87 |
| 117 | 8 | "Top Model 10 Confidential" | April 9, 2008 | 2.38 |
| 118 | 9 | "For Those About to Walk, We Salute You" | April 16, 2008 | 3.85 |
| 119 | 10 | "Viva Italia!" | April 23, 2008 | 4.35 |
| 120 | 11 | "We Are Spartans!" | April 30, 2008 | 4.19 |
| 121 | 12 | "Ready For My Close-Up" | May 7, 2008 | 4.02 |
| 122 | 13 | "And... the Winner is!" | May 14, 2008 | 4.75 |

=== Cycle 11 (2008) ===
| No. overall | No. in season | Title | Original release date | US viewers (millions) |
|---|---|---|---|---|
| 123 | 1 | "The Notorious Fierce Fourteen" | September 3, 2008 | 3.51 |
| 124 | 2 | "Top Model Inauguration" | September 3, 2008 | 3.51 |
| 125 | 3 | "The Ladder of Model Success" | September 10, 2008 | 3.86 |
| 126 | 4 | "You're Beautiful, Now Change" | September 17, 2008 | 4.26 |
| 127 | 5 | "Fierce Eyes" | September 24, 2008 | 4.13 |
| 128 | 6 | "Natural Beauty" | October 1, 2008 | 4.03 |
| 129 | 7 | "Fiercee Awards" | October 8, 2008 | 3.93 |
| 130 | 8 | "Top Model 11 Confidential" | October 15, 2008 | 3.21 |
| 131 | 9 | "Now You See Me, Now You Don't" | October 22, 2008 | 4.44 |
| 132 | 10 | "Planes, Trains and Automobiles" | October 29, 2008 | 3.90 |
| 133 | 11 | "The Final Five" | November 5, 2008 | 3.81 |
| 134 | 12 | "Good Times and Windmills" | November 12, 2008 | 3.71 |
| 135 | 13 | "America's Next Top Model is..." | November 19, 2008 | 4.84 |

=== Cycle 12 (2009) ===
| No. overall | No. in season | Title | Original release date | US viewers (millions) |
|---|---|---|---|---|
| 136 | 1 | "What Happens in Vegas" | March 4, 2009 | 3.92 |
| 137 | 2 | "Fun and Games" | March 4, 2009 | 3.92 |
| 138 | 3 | "Do You Light The Way I Look?" | March 11, 2009 | 4.45 |
| 139 | 4 | "New York's Finest" | March 18, 2009 | 3.79 |
| 140 | 5 | "Put Your Best Face Forward" | March 25, 2009 | 2.87 |
| 141 | 6 | "Here's Your Test" | April 1, 2009 | 3.97 |
| 142 | 7 | "Acting Like a Model" | April 8, 2009 | 3.69 |
| 143 | 8 | "Cycle 12 Rewind" | April 8, 2009 | 1.86 |
| 144 | 9 | "Take Me to the Photo Shoot" | April 15, 2009 | 3.78 |
| 145 | 10 | "The Amazing Model Race" | April 22, 2009 | 4.01 |
| 146 | 11 | "Let's Go See the City" | April 29, 2009 | 4.01 |
| 147 | 12 | "Take Me to the Jungle" | May 6, 2009 | 3.82 |
| 148 | 13 | "America's Next Top Model is..." | May 13, 2009 | 4.31 |

=== Cycle 13 (2009) ===
| No. overall | No. in season | Title | Original release date | US viewers (millions) |
|---|---|---|---|---|
| 149 | 1 | "How Short Can You Go" | September 9, 2009 | 3.24 |
| 150 | 2 | "The Early Bird Gets a Makeover" | September 9, 2009 | 3.24 |
| 151 | 3 | "Fortress of Fierceness" | September 16, 2009 | 2.79 |
| 152 | 4 | "Make Me Tall" | September 23, 2009 | 2.82 |
| 153 | 5 | "Take My Photo, Tyra!" | September 30, 2009 | 3.28 |
| 154 | 6 | "Dance With Me" | October 7, 2009 | 3.16 |
| 155 | 7 | "Petite Ninja Warriors" | October 14, 2009 | 3.00 |
| 156 | 8 | "Interview 101" | October 21, 2009 | 2.98 |
| 157 | 9 | "Let's Go Surfing" | October 28, 2009 | 3.51 |
| 158 | 10 | "Dive Deeper" | November 4, 2009 | 3.87 |
| 159 | 11 | "Hawaiian Hip Hop" | November 11, 2009 | 3.20 |
| 160 | 12 | "America's Next Top Model is..." | November 18, 2009 | 3.69 |
| 161 | 13 | "Cycle 13: Revealed" | November 18, 2009 | 1.80 |

=== Cycle 14 (2010) ===
| No. overall | No. in season | Title | Original release date | US viewers (millions) |
|---|---|---|---|---|
| 162 | 1 (Note: When first shown in the United States, Casting Week, weeks 1 and 2 were shown as a separate 90-minute two episodes during its initial run. In other countries, these competing weeks were aired separately in first three episodes (e.g., Casting Week shown in one hour episode) before airing to its original one-hour episode aired in the United States. As well as re-runs in cable television networks across the United States, making them a 13-episode cycle as the second episode during re-runs entitled "Makeover Madness".) | "Be My Friend, Tyra!"/"Makeover Madness" | March 10, 2010 | 3.96 |
| 163 | 2 | "Drecktitude!" | March 17, 2010 | 3.78 |
| 164 | 3 | "Let's Dance" | March 24, 2010 | 3.08 |
| 165 | 4 | "America's Next Top Vampire" | March 31, 2010 | 3.18 |
| 166 | 5 | "Smile and Pose" | April 7, 2010 | 3.17 |
| 167 | 6 | "New York Women" | April 14, 2010 | 2.85 |
| 168 | 7 | "Big Hair Day" | April 21, 2010 | 2.97 |
| 169 | 8 | "Welcome to New Zealand" | April 28, 2010 | 3.29 |
| 170 | 9 | "Hobbits vs. Models" | May 5, 2010 | 3.41 |
| 171 | 10 | "Ugly Looking Woman" | May 12, 2010 | 3.77 |
| 172 | 11 | "America's Next Top Model is..." | May 12, 2010 | 3.77 |
| 173 | 12 | "Chubby Bunny" | May 19, 2010 | 2.03 |

=== Cycle 15 (2010) ===
| No. overall | No. in season | Title | Original release date | US viewers (millions) |
|---|---|---|---|---|
| 174 | 1 | "Welcome to High Fashion" | September 15, 2010 | 2.88 |
| 175 | 2 | "Diane von Furstenberg" | September 15, 2010 | 2.88 |
| 176 | 3 | "Patricia Field" | September 22, 2010 | 2.82 |
| 177 | 4 | "Matthew Rolston" | September 29, 2010 | 2.91 |
| 178 | 5 | "Karolina Kurkova" | October 6, 2010 | 2.85 |
| 179 | 6 | "Patrick Demarchelier" | October 13, 2010 | 2.95 |
| 180 | 7 | "Francesco Carrozzini" | October 20, 2010 | 3.00 |
| 181 | 8 | "Zac Posen" | October 27, 2010 | 2.66 |
| 182 | 9 | "Margherita Missoni" | November 3, 2010 | 2.96 |
| 183 | 10 | "Kyle Hagler" | November 10, 2010 | 2.69 |
| 184 | 11 | "Franca Sozzani" | November 17, 2010 | 2.49 |
| 185 | 12 | "High Fashion Highlights" | November 24, 2010 | 1.84 |
| 186 | 13 | "Roberto Cavalli" | December 1, 2010 | 3.36 |

=== Cycle 16 (2011) ===
| No. overall | No. in season | Title | Original release date | US viewers (millions) |
|---|---|---|---|---|
| 187 | 1 | "Erin Wasson" | February 23, 2011 | 2.25 |
| 188 | 2 | "Alek Wek" | March 2, 2011 | 1.96 |
| 189 | 3 | "Lori Goldstein" | March 9, 2011 | 2.24 |
| 190 | 4 | "Francesco Carrozzini" | March 16, 2011 | 2.03 |
| 191 | 5 | "Rachel Zoe" | March 23, 2011 | 2.21 |
| 192 | 6 | "Sonia Dara" | March 30, 2011 | 2.18 |
| 193 | 7 | "Eric Daman" | April 6, 2011 | 1.89 |
| 194 | 8 | "Lana Marks" | April 13, 2011 | 2.08 |
| 195 | 9 | "Highlights and Catfights" | April 20, 2011 | 1.58 |
| 196 | 10 | "Franca Sozzani" | April 27, 2011 | 2.39 |
| 197 | 11 | "Daniella Issa Helayel" | May 4, 2011 | 1.94 |
| 198 | 12 | "Ivan Bart" | May 11, 2011 | 2.03 |
| 199 | 13 | "Season Finale" | May 18, 2011 | 1.81 |

=== Cycle 17 (2011) ===
| No. overall | No. in season | Title | Original release date | US viewers (millions) |
|---|---|---|---|---|
| 200 | 1 | "Nicki Minaj" | September 14, 2011 | 1.96 |
| 201 | 2 | "Ashlee Simpson" | September 21, 2011 | 1.60 |
| 202 | 3 | "Kristin Cavallari" | September 28, 2011 | 1.76 |
| 203 | 4 | "Anthony Zuiker" | October 5, 2011 | 1.74 |
| 204 | 5 | "La Toya Jackson" | October 12, 2011 | 1.90 |
| 205 | 6 | "Coco Rocha" | October 19, 2011 | 1.94 |
| 206 | 7 | "Kathy Griffin" | October 26, 2011 | 2.27 |
| 207 | 8 | "Game" | November 2, 2011 | 1.87 |
| 208 | 9 | "Nikos Papadopoulos" | November 9, 2011 | 1.70 |
| 209 | 10 | "Exploring Greece" | November 16, 2011 | 1.90 |
| 210 | 11 | "Highlights" | November 23, 2011 | 1.02 |
| 211 | 12 | "Tyson Beckford" | November 30, 2011 | 1.91 |
| 212 | 13 | "All-Star Finale" | December 7, 2011 | 2.39 |

=== Cycle 18 (2012) ===
| No. overall | No. in season | Title | Original release date | US viewers (millions) |
|---|---|---|---|---|
| 213 | 1 | "Kelly Osbourne" | February 29, 2012 | 1.17 |
| 214 | 2 | "Kris Jenner" | March 7, 2012 | 1.32 |
| 215 | 3 | "Cat Deeley" | March 14, 2012 | 1.01 |
| 216 | 4 | "J. Alexander" | March 21, 2012 | 1.25 |
| 217 | 5 | "Beverly Johnson" | March 28, 2012 | 1.38 |
| 218 | 6 | "Jessica Sutta & Nadine Coyle" | April 11, 2012 | 1.08 |
| 219 | 7 | "Estelle" | April 18, 2012 | 1.31 |
| 220 | 8 | "Georgina Chapman" | April 25, 2012 | 1.15 |
| 221 | 9 | "Barney Cheng" | May 2, 2012 | 1.01 |
| 222 | 10 | "Nicholas Tse" | May 9, 2012 | 1.06 |
| 223 | 11 | "Jez Smith" | May 16, 2012 | 1.16 |
| 224 | 12 | "Highlights" | May 23, 2012 | 0.83 |
| 225 | 13 | "Season Finale" | May 30, 2012 | 1.42 |

=== Cycle 19 (2012) ===
| No. overall | No. in season | Title | Original release date | US viewers (millions) |
|---|---|---|---|---|
| 226 | 1 | "The Girl Who Makes the Grade" | August 24, 2012 | 1.09 |
| 227 | 2 | "The Girl Who Cries Home" | August 31, 2012 | 1.07 |
| 228 | 3 | "The Girl Who Wants Out" | September 7, 2012 | 1.49 |
| 229 | 4 | "The Girl Who Does What Tyler Perry Says" | September 14, 2012 | 1.41 |
| 230 | 5 | "The Girl Who Sings for Alicia Keys" | September 21, 2012 | 1.32 |
| 231 | 6 | "The Girl Who Gets Pwn'd" | September 28, 2012 | 0.96 |
| 232 | 7 | "The Girl Who Licks the Floor" | October 5, 2012 | 1.11 |
| 233 | 8 | "The Girl Who Comes Back" | October 19, 2012 | 1.47 |
| 234 | 9 | "The Girls Go to Jamaica" | October 26, 2012 | 1.14 |
| 235 | 10 | "The Girl Who Becomes Art For Tyra" | November 2, 2012 | 1.26 |
| 236 | 11 | "The Girl Who Freaks Out on Horseback" | November 9, 2012 | 1.41 |
| 237 | 12 | "The Girl Who Becomes America's Next Top Model" | November 16, 2012 | 1.36 |
| 238 | 13 | "The Girl With the Best Top Model Freakout" | November 16, 2012 | 0.77 |

=== Cycle 20 (2013) ===
| No. overall | No. in season | Title | Original release date | US viewers (millions) |
|---|---|---|---|---|
| 239 | 1 | "Meet the Guys & Girls of Cycle 20" | August 2, 2013 | 1.55 |
| 240 | 2 | "The Girl Who Gets Married Again" | August 9, 2013 | 1.22 |
| 241 | 3 | "The Guy Who Gets a Weave" | August 16, 2013 | 1.40 |
| 242 | 4 | "The Girl Who Went Around in Circles" | August 23, 2013 | 0.85 |
| 243 | 5 | "The Guy Who Gets to Kiss the Girl" | August 30, 2013 | 1.12 |
| 244 | 6 | "The Girl Who is Scared of Clowns" | September 6, 2013 | 1.26 |
| 245 | 7 | "The Guy Who Cries" | September 13, 2013 | 1.16 |
| 246 | 8 | "The Girl Whose Walk is TOO Good" | September 20, 2013 | 1.12 |
| 247 | 9 | "The Guys and Girls Get Flirty" | September 27, 2013 | 1.02 |
| 248 | 10 | "The Girl Who Gets Punked" | October 4, 2013 | 1.14 |
| 249 | 11 | "The Guy Who Has a Panic Attack" | October 11, 2013 | 1.13 |
| 250 | 12 | "The Girl Who Gets Kissed on an Elephant" | October 18, 2013 | 1.10 |
| 251 | 13 | "The Guy Who Becomes a Bat" | November 1, 2013 | 1.01 |
| 252 | 14 | "Finale Part 1: The Finalists Shoot Their Guess Campaign" | November 8, 2013 | 1.08 |
| 253 | 15 | "Finale Part 2: The Guy or Girl Who Becomes America's Next Top Model" | November 15, 2013 | 1.29 |

=== Cycle 21 (2014) ===
| No. overall | No. in season | Title | Original release date | US viewers (millions) |
|---|---|---|---|---|
| 254 | 1 | "The Boyz R Back" | August 18, 2014 | 1.18 |
| 255 | 2 | "The Guy Who Gets a Second Chance" | August 25, 2014 | 0.97 |
| 256 | 3 | "The Girl Who's a Player" | September 1, 2014 | 1.23 |
| 257 | 4 | "The Guy Who Gets a Beard Weave" | September 8, 2014 | 0.99 |
| 258 | 5 | "The Guy Who Starts a Fight" | September 15, 2014 | 1.00 |
| 259 | 6 | "The Girl Who Got Five Frames" | September 22, 2014 | 1.17 |
| 260 | 7 | "The Guy Who Wears Heels" | October 3, 2014 | 1.12 |
| 261 | 8 | "The Girl Who Says it's Over" | October 10, 2014 | 1.04 |
| 262 | 9 | "The Guy Who Wows Betsey Johnson" | October 17, 2014 | 1.06 |
| 263 | 10 | "The Girl With the Bloodcurling Scream" | October 24, 2014 | 1.08 |
| 264 | 11 | "What Happens on ANTM Stays on ANTM" | October 31, 2014 | 0.80 |
| 265 | 12 | "The Guy Who Parties Too Hard" | November 7, 2014 | 1.08 |
| 266 | 13 | "The Girl Who Gets Caught on a Lie" | November 14, 2014 | 1.19 |
| 267 | 14 | "The Guy With Moves Like Elvis" | November 21, 2014 | 1.16 |
| 268 | 15 | "Finale Part One: The Last Girl Standing" | December 5, 2014 | 1.16 |
| 269 | 16 | "Finale Part Two: America's Next Top Model is..." | December 5, 2014 | 1.16 |

=== Cycle 22 (2015) ===
| No. overall | No. in season | Title | Original release date | US viewers (millions) |
|---|---|---|---|---|
| 270 | 1 | "The Guys and Girls Make it to Hollywood" | August 5, 2015 | 1.15 |
| 271 | 2 | "The Girl Who Walks Away" | August 12, 2015 | 1.21 |
| 272 | 3 | "The Guy Who Gets Shipped Out" | August 19, 2015 | 1.20 |
| 273 | 4 | "The Girl Who Has a Close Shave" | August 26, 2015 | 1.34 |
| 274 | 5 | "The Guy Who Gets a Hickey" | September 2, 2015 | 1.20 |
| 275 | 6 | "The Girl Who Gets Possessed" | September 9, 2015 | 1.40 |
| 276 | 7 | "The Guy Who Acts a Fool" | September 16, 2015 | 1.52 |
| 277 | 8 | "The Girl Who Got All Dolled Up" | September 23, 2015 | 1.36 |
| 278 | 9 | "The Guy or Girl Who Came Back" | October 2, 2015 | 1.07 |
| 279 | 10 | "The Girl Who Became Bootyful" | October 9, 2015 | 1.00 |
| 280 | 11 | "And Then That Happened" | October 23, 2015 | 0.73 |
| 281 | 12 | "The Guy Who Closed Deal in Vegas" | October 30, 2015 | 0.94 |
| 282 | 13 | "The Girl Who Got Shot in the Dark" | November 6, 2015 | 0.95 |
| 283 | 14 | "The Guy Who Was a Momma's Boy" | November 13, 2015 | 1.03 |
| 284 | 15 | "Finale Part 1: The Girl Who Made a Splash" | November 20, 2015 | 0.95 |
| 285 | 16 | "Finale Part 2: America's Next Top Model is..." | December 4, 2015 | 1.16 |

=== Cycle 23 (2016–17) ===
| No. overall | No. in season | Title | Original release date | US viewers (millions) |
|---|---|---|---|---|
| 286 | 1 | "Business, Brand, Boss" | December 12, 2016 | 1.30 |
| 287 | 2 | "Lights, Camera, Catwalk" | December 19, 2016 | 1.19 |
| 288 | 3 | "Make Your Mark" | December 26, 2016 | 1.15 |
| 289 | 4 | "Major Key Alert" | January 2, 2017 | 1.17 |
| 290 | 5 | "Avant Garde" | January 9, 2017 | 1.19 |
| 291 | 6 | "Out For the Count" | January 16, 2017 | 1.04 |
| 292 | 7 | "X Marks the Spot" | January 23, 2017 | 1.30 |
| 293 | 8 | "The Glamorous Life" | January 30, 2017 | 1.01 |
| 294 | 9 | "The Comeback" | February 1, 2017 | 0.54 |
| 295 | 10 | "Platform Power" | February 8, 2017 | 0.71 |
| 296 | 11 | "Celebrity Life" | February 15, 2017 | 0.64 |
| 297 | 12 | "And Action!" | February 22, 2017 | 0.69 |
| 298 | 13 | "Beyond the Scenes, Beyond the Flash" | February 23, 2017 | 0.69 |
| 299 | 14 | "Brand Like a Boss" | March 1, 2017 | 0.65 |
| 300 | 15 | "The Final Countdown" | March 8, 2017 | 0.86 |

=== Cycle 24 (2018) ===
| No. overall | No. in season | Title | Original release date | US viewers (millions) |
|---|---|---|---|---|
| 301 | 1 | "The Boss is Back" | January 9, 2018 | 0.85 |
| 302 | 2 | "Beauty is Los Angeles" | January 16, 2018 | 0.76 |
| 303 | 3 | "Beauty is a Trademark" | January 23, 2018 | 0.38 |
| 304 | 4 | "Beauty is Drama" | January 30, 2018 | 0.79 |
| 305 | 5 | "Beauty is Unconventional" | February 6, 2018 | 0.68 |
| 306 | 6 | "Beauty is Pride" | February 13, 2018 | 0.59 |
| 307 | 7 | "Beauty is Raw" | February 20, 2018 | 0.66 |
| 308 | 8 | "Beauty is Social" | February 27, 2018 | 0.33 |
| 309 | 9 | "Beauty is Movement" | March 6, 2018 | 0.67 |
| 310 | 10 | "Beauty is Real" | March 13, 2018 | 0.53 |
| 311 | 11 | "Behind the Beauty" | March 13, 2018 | 0.41 |
| 312 | 12 | "Beauty is Personality" | March 20, 2018 | 0.78 |
| 313 | 13 | "Beauty is a Comeback" | March 27, 2018 | 0.74 |
| 314 | 14 | "Beauty is Commercial" | April 3, 2018 | 0.22 |
| 315 | 15 | "Next Level Fierce" | April 10, 2018 | 0.29 |

== Specials ==
| No. | Title | Original release date | US viewers (millions) |
|---|---|---|---|
| S–1 | "The Runway Ahead" | May 12, 2004 | 3.96 |
| S–2 | "What the Divas are Doing Now" | March 1, 2005 | 3.86 |
| S–3 | "Return to the Runway" | September 20, 2005 | 3.21 |
| S–4 | "Where the Girls Are" | March 1, 2006 | 1.97 |
| S–5 | "America's Next Top Model Exposed, Part I" | February 6, 2008 | 1.74 |
| S–6 | "America's Next Top Model Exposed, Part II" | February 13, 2008 | 1.41 |
