= Elyse Sewell =

American fashion model (born 1982)

- Born: Elyse Marie Sewell; June 10, 1982 (age 44); Albuquerque, New Mexico, U.S.
- Education: University of New Mexico
- Years active: 2003–2009
- Modeling information
- Height: 5 ft 10 in (1.78 m)
- Hair color: Dark Brown
- Eye color: Blue
- Agency: Wilhelmina Models; M4 Models; Q6 Models; Dream Models; Elite Models

Elyse Marie Sewell (born June 10, 1982) is an American fashion model. She is best known for her appearance as a contestant in the first cycle of the reality television series America's Next Top Model.

She was named one of Wired magazine's 10 Sexiest Geeks of 2005.

== Early life ==
Sewell was born in Albuquerque, New Mexico to a father of British descent and a Mexican mother. She obtained a Bachelor of Arts in Spanish and a Bachelor of Science in Biology from the University of New Mexico. She also worked as a research assistant in an evolutionary biology lab.

== Career ==
=== America's Next Top Model ===
Sewell's start in modeling came with her appearance on the first cycle of America's Next Top Model. She was known on the show as the "edgy pre-med student". She was the last eliminated, losing to winner Adrianne Curry and first runner-up Shannon Stewart.

In 2005, one of her "confessional" clips from the show, in which she expressed a profanity-laden rant against the people on the show, earned her 16th place on E!'s Most Outrageous TV Moments. She attributes this outburst to the unusual requirement on the show to voice one's private thoughts and to soliloquize in a "confessional booth".

While on the show, she said that she would be going to medical school if she did not win the competition.

=== After America's Next Top Model ===
After the competition, Sewell pursued a modeling career in East Asia, working mainly in Hong Kong. Sewell has appeared in print advertisements for Chanel and Chow Sang Sang Jewelry, and appeared on the cover of Harper's Bazaar Hong Kong and in editorials for Hong Kong Esquire and Cosmopolitan. Despite Tyra Banks' hope that Sewell would come to see that modeling was not as easy as it was often made out to be, Sewell continued to insist that it was the "easiest job in the world".

In 2004, Sewell started a LiveJournal blog about her experiences of modeling overseas. In 2006, she published "Beauty and The Biz: The International Adventures of America's Third-to-Next Top Model" in Hong Kong, based in part on the blog. She appeared at multiple book signings across Hong Kong. Her other writing credits include a satirical piece for Bust Magazine on how to be a reality TV star, as well as posts for the website Lemondrop.
