= America's Next Top Model season 1 =

America's Next Top Model
- Season 1
- Judges: Tyra Banks; Janice Dickinson; Kimora Lee Simmons; Beau Quillian
- No. of contestants: 10
- Winner: Adrianne Curry
- No. of episodes: 9

Release
- Original network: UPN
- Original release: May 20 – July 15, 2003

Additional information
- Filming dates: December 30, 2002 – February 5, 2003

Season chronology
- Next → Season 2

America's Next Top Model, cycle 1 is the first cycle of America's Next Top Model. It originally aired on UPN from May to July 2003, and was hosted by Tyra Banks, who additionally served as its executive producer and presenter. The judging panel consisted of Banks, Janice Dickinson, Kimora Lee Simmons, and Beau Quillian. The cycle's catchphrase was "One girl has what it takes."

This was the only cycle to feature a cast of ten contestants; all later cycles featured at least twelve. The international destination for the cycle was Paris, France.

The winner of the competition was 20-year-old Adrianne Curry from Joliet, Illinois, with Shannon Stewart finishing as the runner-up. Her prizes were a modeling contract with Wilhelmina Models, a photo spread in Marie Claire magazine, and a contract with Revlon cosmetics.

== Contestants ==
Contestants for America's Next Top Model season 1
Contestant	Age	Height	Hometown	Outcome	Place	Ref.
Tessa Carlson	19	5 ft 9 in (1.75 m)	Chicago, Illinois	Episode 1	10	
Katie Cleary	21	5 ft 9 in (1.75 m)	Glenview, Illinois	Episode 2	9	
Nicole Panattoni	22	5 ft 11 in (1.80 m)	Murrieta, California	Episode 3	8	
Ebony Haith	24	5 ft 10 in (1.78 m)	Harlem, New York	Episode 4	7	
Giselle Samson	18	5 ft 10 in (1.78 m)	Corona, California	Episode 5	6	
Kesse Wallace	21	5 ft 9.5 in (1.77 m)	North Little Rock, Arkansas	Episode 6	5	
Robin Manning	27	5 ft 10 in (1.78 m)	Memphis, Tennessee	Episode 7	4	
Elyse Sewell	20	5 ft 10 in (1.78 m)	Albuquerque, New Mexico	Episode 9	3	
Shannon Stewart	18	5 ft 10.5 in (1.79 m)	Franklin, Ohio	Episode 9	2	
Adrianne Curry	20	5 ft 11 in (1.80 m)	Joliet, Illinois	Episode 9	1	

== Episodes ==
No. overall	No. in season	Title	Original release date	US viewers (millions)
1	1	"The Girl Who Wants It Bad"	May 20, 2003	2.92
Twenty contestants, chosen from thousands of hopefuls, arrived in Los Angeles for the preliminary round of the competition. Among them were Elyse, a medical student who ultimately became one of the most successful contestants of the Top Model franchise; devout Christians Kesse, Robin and Shannon; out lesbian Ebony; and Natalie, who had a dysfunctional childhood. The contestants were told that only ten of them would make it to the shows, but Tyra and the producers only could agree on top eight contestants. The top eight contestants arrived in New York City and were escorted to the loft apartment in the Flatotel. In one room, they discovered pullout mattresses underneath their beds. These were for two wildcard contestants, Giselle and Tessa, who had been scouted at a separate audition for the competition. Brazilian bikini waxes were administered to the contestants, and heights and initial weights were recorded. Early the next morning the contestants headed to their first photo shoot, in which they modelled J.Lo by Jennifer Lopez swimwear atop a Manhattan skyscraper in frigid weather. They were shot by Douglas Bizzaro and Elizabeth Moss. Four contestants - Ebony, Kesse, Robin and Shannon - arrived late, disappointing Tyra. After the shoot the contestants had dinner at the Palm restaurant. Tension brewed when Robin asked Elyse if she was religious, and Elyse revealed she was a militant atheist. At the first judging session, the judges were concerned about Elyse's weight, and remarked that Shannon had tanned too much. The judges thought Tessa lacked the personality of a top model and her personal appearance was underwhelming. In the bottom two were Shannon and Tessa, and Tessa became the first contestant to leave the competition.: Featured photographer: Douglas Bizzaro and Elizabeth Moss
2	2	"The Girl is Here to Win, Not Make Friends"	May 27, 2003	3.20
Tensions erupted in the loft between the Christians - Robin and Shannon - and several other contestants, especially concerning Elyse's atheism and Ebony's homosexuality. After a runway lesson with J. Alexander, Giselle won the reward for doing the best on the runway. She got to meet Wyclef Jean, and she picked Adrianne, Nicole and Katie to accompany her much to Ebony's dismay. When Ebony decided not to tell them about the Tyra Mail which arrived while they were out, the Christians went down to the hotel's lobby and told the other contestants about the Tyra Mail. The next day Robin, to ease the tension among the contestants, led a group prayer, irritating Elyse, who went to the confessional and proceeded to vent her anger towards other contestants. The second photo shoot was another bikini shoot, but this time for Stuff magazine. At panel, the contestants were challenged to walk while removing their coats. Katie's photo was again criticized for being pornographic, while Kesse became emotional during her critique. They were placed in the bottom two. Katie's overt sexual appeal sent her home.: Featured photographer: Barry Hollywood; Special guests: Wyclef Jean
3	3	"The Girl Who Gets Rushed to the Emergency Room"	June 3, 2003	4.13
The top eight contestants were given makeovers. Giselle irritated her roommates because she overreacted during it, while both Robin and Ebony were dissatisfied with the way their hair was handled. After a lesson on how to achieve a clean look, the reward challenge involved doing the best job picking out and putting on makeup, which Elyse won, and got to meet some famous fashion people, including Max Tucci. She picked Adrianne and Nicole to thank them for their help and wound up picking Robin by draw. Nicole decided not to go because she wanted to talk to her boyfriend, although she claimed she was sick. Later it was announced that each contestant would be posing with a guest model in the week's shoot — a snake. Robin and Nicole were terrified by the snake, but most of the contestants managed to take strong pictures. The day after the shoot, Adrianne was rushed to the hospital with severe food poisoning, and she later forced her way out of the hospital and back to the competition so as not to be automatically eliminated, impressing the judges. At panel, Ebony was criticized for the texture of her skin, and Nicole was deemed not committed enough to the competition. As a result, Nicole was sent home and Ebony was spared.: Featured photographer: Troy Ward; Special guests: Kim Lepine, Jon Silverman, Max Tucci, Janice Combs, Constance White, and Derek Kahn
4	4	"The Girl Who Drives Everyone Crazy"	June 10, 2003	3.38
The top seven contestants were challenged to polish their acting skills. The reward challenge, a line-reading challenge, was won by Robin, who took Kesse and Shannon to get a spa treatment. The other contestants were left to clean the apartment while the spa experts came to them and gave them their spa treatments in the apartment. Ebony was angry with Giselle after she exhibited laziness by not helping the others clean, and asked the masseur for an impromptu massage instead. Ebony's girlfriend, Ka visited her and although most of the contestants were polite and introduced themselves, Shannon and Robin chose to stay in their room and read the Bible, which Ebony took offense to and felt that they were being hypocritical and homophobic. Shannon later apologized to Ebony for coming across as bigoted and even herself admitted that she needed to become more tolerant of people with different sexual orientations if she planned on pursuing a modeling career in the fashion industry. This week instead of a photo shoot, the contestants did a commercial for Fresh Look contact lenses. At panel, while Kesse excelled, several contestants were given harsh criticism for their performances. Adrianne was told that her accent was too strong, and that the judges barely heard her and Shannon was admonished for her awkward smile and lack of sexiness. Giselle and Ebony were deemed the worst and landed in the bottom two. The panel said that although she had amazing model potential, Giselle needed to become more self-confident, while Ebony, the early frontrunner to many of the girls, was eliminated due to her awkward performance in the commercial and that the judges felt she had a chip on her shoulder.: Featured commercial director: Loren Haynes; Special guests: Jon Silverman, Alice Spivak, and Tracy Staus
5	5	"The Girl Who Everyone Thinks is Killing Herself"	June 17, 2003	3.45
The top six contestants were taught how to answer interview questions in this episode, and they had one-on-ones with a coach. While Elyse was being interviewed, the other contestants gossiped about her weight and talked about incidents which they believed proved that she had an eating disorder. At the challenge, the contestants tried to impress a tough interviewer, and Elyse's candid and outspoken remarks won her the opportunity to invite one of her loved ones to New York for a brief visit. She selected Adrianne to share her prize, who broke down into tears, stating that her mother had never been to New York and that her family never had enough money to travel. At the photo shoot, to which Elyse's boyfriend Martin Crandall and Adrianne's mother showed up, each model was pictured in Reebok shoes with NFL Rookie of the Year Clinton Portis. At panel, Elyse was criticized for being too thin and being a know-it-all, and Giselle was sent home at panel because she was not able to overcome her self-confidence issues, despite her modeling talent and phenomenal photo for this week.: Featured photographer: Daniel Garriga; Special guests: Cindy Berger, Jon Silverman, Clinton Portis, Christine Curry, Martin Crandall, Derek Kahn, and Steve Santagati
6	6	"The Girl Who Deals With a Pervert"	June 24, 2003	3.40
The top five contestants were told that they would be flying to Paris, the fashion capital of the world. In their hotel, Robin was picked by draw to sleep on the floor, much to her dismay. They had a lingerie shoot for Wonder Bra with male model Brad Pinkert, and each contestant was given the opportunity to go on several "go-sees" to impress Parisian designers. Adrianne was fazed after an unwanted encounter with a man who tried to reach up her skirt while asking him for directions and had difficulty collecting herself. Kesse spent a little too much time visiting Paris, making her miss one go-see and Robin paid someone to accompany her, for which she was admonished by the judges. At panel, Elyse was praised for her go-sees while Kesse and Adrianne found themselves in the bottom two for not attending all of their "go-sees", and in an emotional elimination, Kesse was cut for not demonstrating enough desire to continue.: Featured photographer: Michel Haddi; Special guests: "Pink" Greg Francis, Brad Pinkert, Emma Mackie, and Marilyn Gauthier
7	7	"The Girls Get Really Naked"	July 1, 2003	4.42
This week, the top four contestants had their pictures taken by Tyra in an impromptu black-and-white photo shoot. Then, they traveled to the House of Carven, the oldest couture house in Paris. They learned how to embody couture gowns with an alluring attitude. Back in the house, the contestants received Tyra mail saying that they would have some free time the following day. When Adrianne said she wanted to visit Jim Morrison’s grave, it ignited a conflict among them, specifically with Robin who wanted to go shopping. Eventually the contestants would split in groups of two (Shannon with Robin and Elyse with Adrianne). For the week’s challenge, the contestants went to Fouquet’s Restaurant and met four gentlemen, who judged them in their ability to carry themselves in a couture situation. Adrianne’s shining personality charmed the blokes and she was chosen as the winner. She picked Elyse to join in her reward which was a one night stay at the Presidential Suite in Le Méridien Hotel. The next day, the contestants arrived at Buddha Bar for a nude photo shoot for Merit Diamond Jewelry. However, this did not go well with Robin and Shannon as it was against their beliefs and decided not to participate, despite being offered to pose in flesh-toned lingerie. The top four contestants returned to New York and shared the Milan Room. At panel, Elyse was called first for her versatility and followed by Adrianne who took a stellar photograph. Robin was accused for shaking her breasts at Jay Manuel (unaware that Tyra was around the corner and witnessed this as well) making her decision not to participate in the nude photo shoot seem fake while Shannon was criticized for her inability to follow advice, although she as well did not take part in the nude photo shoot. In the end, Shannon’s outgoing personality saved her and Robin was sent home as the judges felt that she might have just been a bit too conservative for the modeling and fashion industry.: Featured photographers: Tyra Banks and Patrick Katzman; Special guests: Pascal Millet and Derek Khan
8	8	"How the Girls Got Here"	July 8, 2003	2.43
This episode was an overview of the past seven episodes of the cycle which featured previously unseen footage.
9	9	"The Girl Who Becomes America's Next Top Model"	July 8, 2003	4.47
The top three contestants were evaluated by Kimora Lee Simmons and again by the judging panel to get booked for the finale runway show. Shannon was called first while Elyse and Adrianne - a pair that had become close friends through the competition - were placed in the bottom two. Elyse was ousted because the judges felt her speech sometimes came across as careless and that she had not taken to heart the judges' credence in modeling being a profession that required both brains and beauty. Soon after this, Adrianne and Shannon faced off on the runway modeling Baby Phat fashions, and finally both final two faced the panel one last time. During evaluation Shannon was praised for her runway walk, receiving Janice Dickinson's support, and her eloquence but was criticized for being too commercial and safe. On the other hand, Tyra revealed that she was pleasantly surprised Adrianne made it that far and she was also praised for her edge and character, although both her speech & walk was criticized. After evaluating, Tyra called the final two back in and Adrianne was declared the first winner of America's Next Top Model.: Special guest: Drew Lineham

== Summaries ==
=== Assignments ===
Assignments for America's Next Top Model season 1
Episode	Type	Concept
1	Photo shoot	J.Lo by Jennifer Lopez swimwear on a rooftop
2	Photo shoot	Swimwear for Stuff
3	Photo shoot	Beauty shots with snakes
4	Commercial	FreshLook contact lenses
5	Photo shoot	Reebok ad with Clinton Portis
6	Photo shoot	Overlooking the Eiffel Tower, for Wonderbra
7	Photo shoot	Black and white beauty shots
7	Photo shoot	Nude, for Merit Diamond
9	Fashion show	Final runway, for Baby Phat

=== Progress ===
Call-out orders and individual achievements for America's Next Top Model season 1
Order	Episodes (Note: Episode 8 was a recap episode.)									
Order	1 (Note: In episode 1, the pool of 20 contestants was reduced to 8. Later, two more contestants – Giselle and Tessa – were scouted and introduced to the cast.)		2	3	4	5	6	7 (Note: In episode 7, Robin and Shannon did not participate in the nude photo shoot.)	9	
1	Nicole	Ebony	Shannon	Shannon	Kesse	Adrianne	Elyse	Elyse	Shannon	Adrianne
2	Robin	Elyse	Nicole	Kesse	Elyse	Kesse	Shannon	Adrianne	Adrianne	Shannon
3	Kesse	Kesse	Giselle	Elyse	Adrianne	Shannon	Robin	Shannon	Elyse	
4	Elyse	Adrianne	Robin	Giselle	Robin	Robin	Adrianne	Robin		
5	Katie	Katie	Adrianne	Adrianne	Shannon	Elyse	Kesse			
6	Ebony	Nicole	Ebony	Robin	Giselle	Giselle				
7	Adrianne	Giselle	Elyse	Ebony	Ebony					
8	Shannon	Robin	Kesse	Nicole						
9	Giselle; Tessa	Shannon	Katie							
10	Giselle; Tessa	Tessa								

The contestant won the challenge
The contestant was eliminated
The contestant won the competition

=== Call-out averages ===
Placements in the casting call-out order and final two are not included.

Call-out averages for America's Next Top Model season 1
Order	Contestant	Place	Call-out total	Call-out amount	Call-out average
1	Elyse	3	24	8	3.00
2	Shannon	2	25	8	3.12
3	Adrianne	1	26	8	3.25
4	Kesse	5	21	6	3.50
5	Robin	4	33	7	4.71
6	Giselle	6	26	5	5.20
7	Ebony	7	21	4	5.25
8	Nicole	8	16	3	5.33
9	Katie	9	14	2	7.00
10	Tessa	10	10	1	10.00

=== Makeovers ===
- Nicole – Extensions trimmed and straightened
- Ebony – Tuft shaved off
- Giselle – Layered with red highlights
- Kesse – Tyra Banks-inspired long honey blonde weave
- Robin – Long light brown weave
- Elyse – Cut shorter with brown highlights
- Shannon – Long blonde extensions
- Adrianne – Long dark brown weave with bangs

== Critical reception ==
Cycle 1 received positive retrospective reviews from critics. Despite its low budget, E. Alex Jung of Vulture commented how this worked to the show's advantage, praising how Tyra “wanted to reflect the reality of life as a working model” and acknowledging that “there was something about the low production value that reflected that simple truth.” He also praised it in comparison to other seasons of America's Next Top Model, commenting how “ANTM’s first season felt like a glimpse into how fashion actually worked” whereas later seasons “became campier, more ludicrous, and vaguely surreal.” Jung also states that Cycle 1 “was the only season where the contestants didn’t readily buy into the project” and commended the season for respecting their decisions, such as when Shannon and Robin refused to pose nude.

Margaret Lyons of Vulture also praised the season, describing it as “unimpeachable” and “one of the best seasons, debut or otherwise, that any reality show has ever had.” She argued that “ANTM helped usher in the era of profession-based reality contest shows” but viewed it more positively compared to the rest of America's Next Top Model's seasons, commenting how “nothing has ever quite lived up to the perfection of season one” and how “the grossness of Tyra’s constant idiotic catchphrases, and the repetitiveness of the challenges (have) eventually eroded my passion for the series.”

== Controversies ==
After winning Cycle 1, Adrianne Curry was meant to receive a contract with Revlon and Wilhelmina Models, but she never received it. America's Next Top Model and Tyra Banks ignored her when she contacted them about the issue, and Curry was subsequently erased from the show. Although she appeared on Cycle 2, and was briefly mentioned in Cycle 20 as part of a challenge, she wasn’t featured in the opening credits for Cycles 7, 8 or 9 alongside the other previous winners of America's Next Top Model, and a photo of her didn’t appear in the contestants’ New York residence alongside the previous Top Model winners.
