= Die Model WG (German TV series) =

Reality documentary series

- Promotial Photograph of the Cast of Die Model WG
- Genre: Reality television
- Presented by: Peyman Amin
- Country of origin: Germany

Original release
- Network: Pro Sieben
- Release: 14 January – 27 February 2010

Die Model WG (German for The Model Community) is a German reality television documentary series which claims to follow the life of aspiring models that are living together in one loft, with most of them being former contestants on Germany's Next Topmodel. It is the German adaptation of the 2009 Austrian series of the same title, which itself was based on the 2008 American television series Modelville. The German Die Model WG aired on Pro Sieben from 14 January to 27 February 2010.

GNTM-judge and model agent Peyman Amin is the mentor of the models and responsible for organizing castings and booking for them. Therefore, he equals the role of a model agent during the girls stay in the apartment. Starting with six girls, the show saw several girls voluntary leaving the apartment and therefore the show over the course of the episodes with a new girl moving in as the replacement. The winner of the show was to move to "Model-WG" in New York.

== Contestants ==
(ages stated are at time of contest)

Name	Age	Hometown	Original Cycle(s)	Original Placement(s)	Finish	Outcome
Larissa Marolt	17	Sankt Kanzian am Klopeiner See	Austria Season 1	1	Episode 1	8
Larissa Marolt	17	Sankt Kanzian am Klopeiner See	Season 4	7	Episode 1	8
Yvonne Schröder	21	Frankfurt am Main	Season 1	2	Episode 4	7
Tessa Bergmeier	20	Hamburg	Season 4	14	Episode 5	6
Denise Dahinten	18	Bruchköbel	Season 2	10	Episode 7	5-4
Sarah Knappik	23	Bochum	Season 3	8	Episode 7	5-4
Victoria Hooper	17	Vienna	Austria Season 1	2	Episode 7	3-2
Sarina Nowak	17	Gerdau-Bohlsen	Season 4	6	Episode 7	3-2
Anne-Kathrin "Anni" Wendler	22	Schwerin	Season 2	2	Episode 7	1

== Weekly performances ==
Name	1	2	3	4	5	6	7
Anni		JOB	JOB	JOB	JOB	JOB	WIN
Victoria				JOB	JOB	JOB	EXIT
Sarina	JOB		JOB		JOB	JOB	EXIT
Denise				JOB	JOB	JOB	EXIT
Sarah					JOB	JOB	EXIT
Tessa		JOB	JOB		EXIT		
Yvonne			JOB	EXIT			
Larissa	EXIT						

The contestant won the competition
The contestant was booked for a job
The contestant was booked for two or more jobs
The contestant left the competition

- Episodes 3 and 6 did not have eliminations.
- In Episode 7, the top 3 was revealed before the winner was announced.

== Controversies ==
While the show was filmed, a fight between two contestants of the show (Tessa and Sarah) became the subject of several tabloid magazines where one was supposed to have attacked the other one with a pan in front of the cameras. So Tessa had to leave the show in the fifth week.
