= Ken Mok =

American film producer (born 1961)

- Born: July 5, 1961 (age 65); Los Angeles, California, U.S.
- Citizenship: United States
- Occupation: Producer

Ken Mok (born July 5, 1961) is an American television producer, and also the founder and president of 10 by 10 Entertainment, a production company which produces television, film and alternative media. Among the television projects being produced under the 10 by 10 banner are the CW network's top-rated reality series, America's Next Top Model, Pussycat Dolls Present, VH1's Miss Rap Supreme, and other shows. Mok is also the creator of the MTV series Making the Band and WWE Tough Enough.

== Career as producer ==
- Joy (2015) (producer)
- America's Next Top Model TV Series (executive producer, cycle 1 - 24)
- Pussycat Dolls Present: The Search for the Next Doll TV Series (executive producer)
- Pussycat Dolls Present: Girlicious TV Series (executive producer)
- Stylista TV Series (executive producer)
- The Shot TV Series (executive producer)
- Ego Trip's Miss Rap Supreme TV Series (executive producer)
- Ego Trip's The (White) Rapper Show TV Series (executive producer)
- Invincible (2006) (producer)
- Made in the USA (2005) TV Series (executive producer)
- Who's Your Daddy? (2005) (TV) (executive producer)
- Totally Hidden Extreme Magic (2004) TV Series (executive producer)
- WWF Tough Enough (2001) TV Series (executive producer)
- Making the Band (2000) TV Series (producer)
- The Tiger Woods Story (1998) (TV) (executive producer)
- Weekend Splash Concert TV series (executive producer, season 1 - present)

== Career as director ==
- "T.H.E.M." (2004) TV Series
