= Renee Alway =

American fashion model

- Born: Renee Diane Alway; April 29, 1986 (age 40); Northern Michigan, Michigan, U.S.
- Other names: NeNe, Nayiem
- Spouse: Jason DeWitt
- Children: 3
- Modeling information
- Height: 5 ft 10.5 in (1.79 m)
- Hair color: Brown
- Eye color: Blue

Renee Diane Alway (born April 29, 1986) is an American fashion model, the last eliminated contestant on America's Next Top Model, Cycle 8 and the runner-up on Modelville.

== Early life ==
Alway was born and raised in northern Michigan, where her father was a pastor and police officer. She revealed in the first episode of Modelville on October 8, 2008, that her father was physically and mentally abusive, and that she, her siblings, and her mother Sandra, were afraid to leave due to her father's respected position in the community as well as his mental instability.

== America's Next Top Model ==
Alway was one of the top three contestants on America's Next Top Model, Cycle 8. She heard about the audition the day before it took place in Chicago, and had been in town to get married. She went to the audition four days after she got married. On the show Alway received two first call-outs and won two challenges. She started feuds with many contestants, but after mediation with Tyra Banks the feud stopped. Alway soon began to get along with her fellow models. Alway made it to the finals but was cut after her CoverGirl ad and commercial. Despite making the best commercial and shooting the best ad, the judges felt Alway couldn't embody a Covergirl because she photographed too old. She was subsequently eliminated.

== Modeling/acting career ==
Alway started modeling when she was 13. Before Top Model, she modeled in New York City, Europe and Japan, and appeared in Seventeen and Italian Vogue. She also appeared in ads for Delia's. Alway appeared in US Weekly with Jaslene Gonzalez, Natasha Galkina and Dionne Walters. Alway has also done post top model work for Roman Holiday Collection.

She has appeared on the CBS TV series Shark, in an episode titled "In Absentia." She competed on the reality show Modelville that aired within The Tyra Banks Show and finished 2nd.

== Personal life ==
Before Top Model, Alway was a stay-at-home mother. She and her husband Jason have three children.

She has said that she has a lot of respect for German supermodel Heidi Klum. She has stated that it was hard for her to find jobs because she was just lost in a sea of blond-haired, blue-eyed models.

On June 28, 2013, Alway was arrested after a six-hour standoff with police in Palm Springs, California. She was arrested for multiple offenses, including drug possession, burglary, committing a felony while on bail, theft, and fraud. She also had prior arrests that year for grand theft of more than $400, grand theft with a firearm, and receiving stolen property.

On December 10, 2014, Alway was sentenced to 12 years in prison after pleading guilty to four felony burglary counts, one count of vehicle theft, one count of firearm possession, and one misdemeanor count of identity theft. More than a dozen other counts against her were dismissed under a plea agreement. Alway was released from prison in April 2018 after serving a 5-year sentence.

Alway publicly came out as gay in 2018.
