= Derek Khan =

Trinidadian-American fashion stylist (1957–2021)

- Born: August 21, 1957; Arima, Colony of Trinidad and Tobago, British Empire
- Died: February 15, 2021 (aged 63); Dubai, United Arab Emirates
- Occupation: Fashion stylist

Derek Khan (August 21, 1957 – February 15, 2021) was a Trinidadian-American fashion stylist. He was known for his styling of hip-hop artists in the 1990s and 2000s.
