= Adrienne Raphel =

American poet and writer (born 1988)

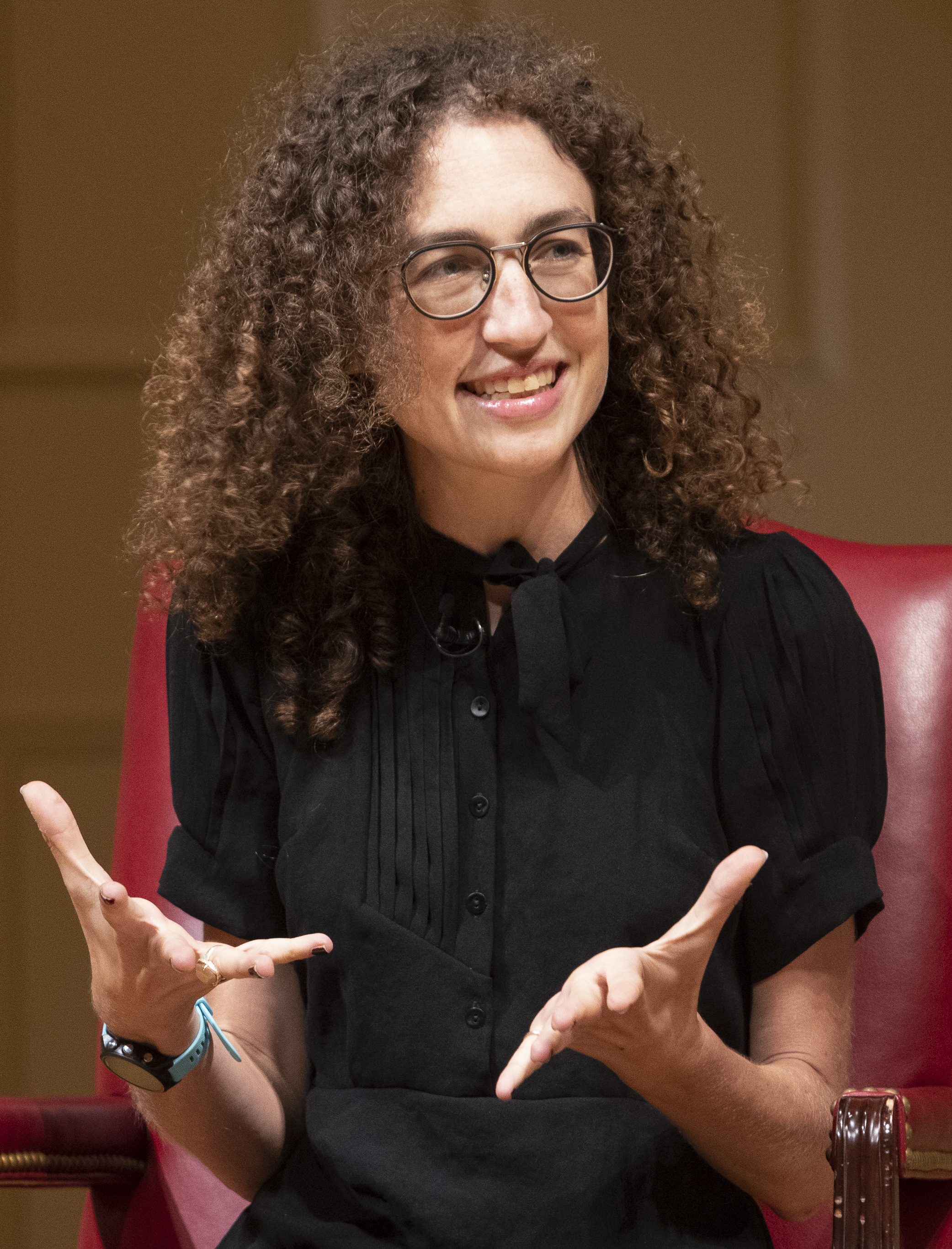
- Raphel at the 2021 National Book Festival
- Born: 1988 (age 37–38) New Jersey, U.S.
- Occupation: Poet; writer
- Education: Princeton University (BA); Iowa Writers' Workshop (MFA); Harvard University (PhD)

Website
- www.adrienneraphel.com

Adrienne Raphel (born 1988) is an American poet and writer. She has published works of poetry as well as a book on the history of crossword puzzles.

== Early life and education ==
Raphel was born in New Jersey but grew up in St. Johnsbury, Vermont, from age ten. She attended the private school St. Johnsbury Academy, writing a puzzle pamphlet as a capstone project in her senior year in 2006. She earned her Bachelor of Arts from Princeton University in 2010, Master of Fine Arts in poetry from the Iowa Writers' Workshop, and PhD in English from Harvard University.

== Career ==
Raphel has written for The New Yorker, The Atlantic, and The Paris Review. Her first poetry collection, What Was It For, was published by Rescue Press in 2017; two years before, the manuscript won the publisher's Black Box Poetry Prize contest. Her collection Our Dark Academia (2022) contains poetry and prose about modern life, including a parody Wikipedia article on what she calls "dark academia".

Raphel writes about the history of crossword puzzles in Thinking Inside the Box (2020), published by Penguin Group. The book grew out of her PhD dissertation on crosswords. Besides conducting archival research and interviews, she competed in the American Crossword Puzzle Tournament and submitted her own puzzle to The New York Times.

== Bibliography ==
- Raphel, Adrienne (2017). What Was It For. Rescue Press. ISBN 9780986086984.
- Raphel, Adrienne (May 16, 2021). Thinking Inside the Box: Adventures with Crosswords and the Puzzling People Who Can't Live Without Them. Penguin Publishing Group. ISBN 9780525522102.
- Raphel, Adrienne (September 27, 2022). Our Dark Academia. Rescue Press. ISBN 9781734831641.
