= Lists of reality television show franchises =

These are a series of lists reality television shows as it has split into two articles:

- List of reality television show franchises (A–G)
- List of reality television show franchises (H–Z)

== See also ==
- List of television show franchises
- Media franchise
