= Die Model WG (Austrian TV series) =

- Genre: Reality television
- Presented by: Andrea Weidler
- Country of origin: Austria
- No. of episodes: 12

Original release
- Network: Puls 4
- Release: 4 May – 20 July 2009

Die Model WG (German for The Model Community) is an Austrian reality television documentary series which follows six former contestants from the first season of Austria's Next Topmodel trying to break through in the modelling business. It debuted on Puls 4 on 4 May 2009. In 2010 German adaptation of the same title resulted from the Austrian Die Model WG.

== Overview ==
Promotional photograph of the cast of Die Model WG

The contestants face a competition where they collect photos for their comp card as new faces on Wiener Models for each job they get booked for and perform well in. The contestant who first collects four photos will become the face of the newest BIPA campaign and move to New York City where she will go on to trying to work on her international breakthrough.

In the first episode, Andrea Weidler, judge on Austria's Next Topmodel and agency chef of Wiener Models, invited the finalists from the other show (excluding winner Larissa Marolt) to compete for five places in a Model Loft. Although actually being the first choice, Constanzia Delort-Laval was forced to withdraw because she underperformed in school after her participation on Austria's Next Topmodel] and therefore made room for two more girls to compete when it was revealed that Kim Sade-Tiroch got a wildcard.

== Contestants ==
- Birgit Königstorfer, 22 from Linz
- Julia Mähder, 20 from Vienna
- Kordula Stöckl, 21 from Naviz
- Kim Sade-Tiroch, 17 from Baden
- Tamara Puljarevic, 18 from Vienna
- Victoria Hooper, 16 from Vienna

== Weekly performances ==
Name	1	2	3	4	6	7	8	9	10	11	12
Kordula	JOB	SED	SED	SED	JOB	SED	JOB	JOB	JOB		WIN
Victoria		SED		SED		SED	JOB		JOB		OUT
Birgit		SED			JOB	SED	JOB	JOB	SED	JOB	OUT
Julia	JOB	SED		SED				JOB	SED	JOB	OUT
Kim		SED		JOB	JOB	SED			SED		OUT
Tamara		SED	JOB	SED	JOB	SED			OUT		

The contestant won the competition
The contestant received a photo for her sedcard
The contestant was booked for a job but did not receive a sedcard
The contestant was asked to leave the competition

- Unlike the German format of the show, only 2 episodes featured eliminations.
- Episode 5 was the recap episode.
- In Episode 7, Julia was absent from judging. Also, one of Kordula's photos was removed from her sedcard and replaced by a new one.

== Criticism ==
The show was accused of being a permanent advertising for its sponsor BIPA where the name of the drug-store-product-line is quite often mentioned as well as for the striking resemblance of its logo to that of the show.

== See also ==
- Austria's Next Topmodel
