= Roland Park Country School =

Private school in Baltimore, Maryland, US

Coordinates: 39.35698°N 76.63475°W

- 5204 Roland Avenue; Baltimore, MD; United States

Information
- Type: Private, Day, College-prep
- Established: 1900
- Sister school: Bryn Mawr School; Gilman School
- Head of School: Joan Smith, HA
- Faculty: 107
- Grades: P–12
- Gender: Girls; Co-ed (preschool)
- Enrollment: 610
- Average class size: 15 students
- Student to teacher ratio: 6:1
- Campus: Suburban, 21-acre (85,000 m^{2}) campus
- Colors: Red and white
- Athletics: 16 Upper School sports, 9 Middle School sports
- Athletics conference: IAAM
- Accreditation: AIMS
- Yearbook: "Quid Nunc"
- Affiliation: NCGS
- Website: www.rpcs.org

Roland Park Country School (RPCS) is an independent all-girls college preparatory school in Baltimore, Maryland, United States. It serves girls from kindergarten through grade 12. It is located on Roland Avenue in the northern area of Baltimore called Roland Park. It has prominent alumni.

== History ==
The neighborhood of Roland Park in Baltimore, Maryland, was established in 1891 by the Roland Park Company. A school was soon needed and in 1894 the company established the Roland Park School and installed teachers Adelaide and Katherine Howard at 410 Notre Dame Avenue (now 4810 Keswick Road). The school opened there on September 25, 1894. The company hired “a high-quality staff” and turned the school into a “first-rate college preparatory institution.” It became the “first fully accredited independent school for girls in Baltimore.”

- 1905: the school was moved to its second location, 210 Roland Avenue (later renumbered 4608). It remained there until 1916. It was a girls’ school, but it admitted boys up to the fourth grade. The principal, Bertha Chapman, instituted a college preparatory curriculum. The first graduating class was in 1907, a class of one.
- 1907: the first graduate, Katherine Jones Harrison, graduated from a class of one.
- 1908: the Roland Park Company ended its sponsorship when the school was incorporated as a no-profit under Maryland laws.
- 1915, ground was broken in October for a new open air school.
- 1916: construction was completed, so the school moved to 817 W. University Parkway. The school remained in that location until 1980. A fire destroyed 75% of the school in 1947: There was another severe fire on the campus in 1976.
- 1918: the school expanded from seven to eight grades in the Main School. There continued to be four grades in the Primary School. Also, RPCS's Alumnae Association was organized.
- 1921: a student government was formed.
- 1932: the president of the Alumnae Association became the first alumnae representative to the Board of Trustees.
- 1947: on the night after the June Commencement, 75% of the school was destroyed by fire. The trustees make an immediate decision to rebuild. The school opened, as scheduled, in September.
- 1963: RPCS changed its admission policy to read: “Application without discrimination for all qualified applicants."
- 1975: the school hired its first headmaster. It also decided, again, to enroll boys in preparatory through 3rd grade. The curriculum expands with added science, electives, and college guidance.
- 1976: during Thanksgiving vacation, fire made the new Upper School wing, built in 1968, unusable. School started the following Monday in makeshift classrooms. The trustees had to make whether to renovate or relocate.
- 1978: the trustees, having decided to relocate, purchased a 21-acre estate at 5204 Roland Avenue, adjacent to St. Mary's Seminary.
- 1980: the school began using its new facility. The students marched up Roland Avenue from their old to their new campus.
- 1981: because of a drop in the male birth population and limited space, RPCS terminates admission for young boys.
- 1987: RPCS, Gilman School and Bryn Mawr School begin to coordinate Upper School classes in the Tri-School Coordination program.
- 1992: Jean Waller Brune, class of 1960, was appointed head of the school, the first RPCS alumna to be so appointed.
- 1996: Mary Ellen Thomsen became the first female president of the board of trustees.
- 1996: RPCS completed construction of an Arts Center, a new Upper and Middle School library, science labs, classrooms, a computer center, and an expanded athletic center.
- 1998: Celeste Woodward Applefeld, class of 1964, became the second female president of the Board of Trustees and the first alumna to hold the position.
- 2001: RPCS celebrated its centennial and dedicated its new building: Lower School additions, the Smith Middle School, new science laboratories and new Upper School classrooms. Also, the school purchased a building, which had been rented out for squash playing, to use as a squash facility.
- 2008: RPCS completed construction of its Athletic Complex.
- 2016: Caroline Blatti became the seventh head of RPCS.
- 2024: Previous Head of Upper School, Joan Smith, becomes the eighth Head of School.

== Academics ==
Roland Park Country School (RPCS) has a dual emphasis, one of which is “academic achievement.”

The school has 85 classroom teachers, 85% of whom hold advanced degrees. Their average class size is 15 students. The student–teacher ratio is 9:1 compared to a national average of 13:1.

RPCS is divided into four schools, each with its own head: Pre-school, Lower School, Middle School, and Upper School. All four offer math, physical education, and science.

Pre-school
The Pre-school is open to three and four-year-old girls and boys. The curriculum includes language arts, library, music, art, foreign language, and computer.

Lower School
The Lower School includes kindergarten, pre-first grade, and grades 1-5. The courses offered include language arts, French, social studies, Spanish, computer, Mandarin Chinese, music, dance, art, and library.

Middle School
The Middle School includes grades 6-8. The courses offered include Chinese, lab skills, civics, French, geography, Spanish, art, ancient history, Latin, music, Technology, dance, English, library, and theater.

Upper School
The Upper School comprises grades 9-12. Courses required or offered as electives include foreign language, college prep, public speaking, English, laboratory science, in three sections regular, accelerated, and honors, history, fine and performing arts, affective education, and SAT preparation. Advanced Placement courses are available in twenty-six subjects.

RPCS offers a Foreign Language Certificate to Upper School students who meet its formal study and its experience of immersion in a foreign language requirements. The formal study requirements entail studying two languages simultaneously during a student’s Upper School years. The experience of immersion in a foreign language includes participation in one of the student exchange program, attending a foreign language summer camp or studying abroad in a foreign language.

RPCS includes the STEM Institute, as a “school within a school” with its own director. Its purpose is to train Upper School students in the fields of science, technology, engineering, and mathematics (STEM). Graduation requirements include formal course work and “a series of semester-long research apprenticeships.” The course work must include two Advanced Placement STEM courses, four full years of science, and four full years of math.

In Tri-School Coordination, adopted in 1987, Upper School students are allowed to take courses at Gilman School and the Bryn Mawr School. This provides students in the three schools a choice of 95 electives. Pedestrian bridges connect the three campuses.

Kaleidoscope
Kaleidoscope Lifelong Learning at Roland Park Country School was established in 1947 “to create outreach programs for alumnae, their friends and the Baltimore community”. “Courses, book talks, trips, and summer camps are offered in the fall, spring and summer semesters. Over 100 Kaleidoscope educational programs and entertainment options with 1,000 participants are hosted each semester.”

=== Diverse student body ===
In 1963, RPCS changed its admission policy to read: “Application without discrimination for all qualified applicants." As a result, the school enrolls a diverse student body as shown in the following chart.

| Student classification | Percent at RPCS |
|---|---|
| White | 71 |
| Black | 18 |
| Asian | 9 |
| Hispanic | 2 |

== Athletics ==
Roland Park Country School (RPCS) has a dual emphasis, one of which is “athletic accomplishment.”

Athletic sports have been “formally” a part of RPCS since World War I. The sports offered by the school include badminton, basketball, crew, cross-country, field hockey, golf, indoor soccer, lacrosse, soccer, softball, squash, swimming, tennis, volleyball, and winter track. The school is member of the Interscholastic Athletic Association of Maryland.

RPCS began its Athletic Hall of Fame in 2006 to honor those who have made significant contributions to the school’s athletic program.

Facilities
Having completed construction of its Athletic Complex in 2008, the school’s athletic facilities include two turf fields, an indoor rowing tank, and a fitness center.

Championship teams
RPCS fielded at least one championship team starting in 1981 through 2015 with the exception of six years. In four of these years, four championship teams were fielded as follows:

- 2005: golf, crew, field hockey, tennis
- 2009: badminton, golf, crew, tennis
- 2010: golf, crew, squash, tennis
- 2013: volleyball
- 2014: badminton, Indoor soccer, softball, volleyball

== Notable alumnae ==
- Sally Buck, baseball team owner and philanthropist
- Adena Friedman, business executive, CEO of Nasdaq, Inc.
- Virginia Hall, undercover Allied agent in France during World War II
- Emily C. Hewitt, former chief judge of the United States Court of Federal Claims (2009–2013)
- Josephine Jacobsen, writer of poetry, short stories, and non-fiction
- Peyton List, actress
- Nicole Ari Parker, actress
- Jane Randall, semi-finalist on America's Next Top Model (cycle 15)
- Adrienne Rich, poet
- Melissa Stark, sports commentator
- Toni-Ann Williams, Olympic gymnast
- Lex Scott Davis, actress
