= Ann Ward =

American fashion model (born 1991)

- Born: Ann Marie Ward; April 20, 1991 (age 35); Dallas, Texas, U.S.
- Modeling information
- Height: 6 ft 2 in (1.88 m)
- Hair color: Brown
- Eye color: Blue
- Agency: Paragon Model Management
- Website: https://www.instagram.com/annmward91/

Ann Marie Ward (born April 20, 1991) is an American fashion model, best known as the winner of Cycle 15 of America's Next Top Model.

== Early life ==
Ward states that Dallas, Texas, is her hometown, although she hails from nearby Prosper, a small suburb that straddles Collin and Denton counties. She graduated from Prosper High School in 2009. She stated repeatedly that she was mocked during school due to her height and slim figure, which caused her to develop self-confidence problems.

== America's Next Top Model ==
In 2010, Ward appeared in Cycle 15 of the CW Network reality television show, America's Next Top Model, in which she competed against thirteen other aspiring models. Ward was immediately distinguishable for her 6'2" height. The judges were also shocked by her extremely thin waist, which was so skinny that runway trainer J. Alexander could nearly wrap both his hands all the way around it. Upon first seeing Ward, show host and retired supermodel Tyra Banks said, "There's something about her that I like!" A trailer for America's Next Top Model showed Banks's comments immediately after a discussion about Ward's waist, which created a public backlash that Banks was condoning overly skinny models. Later, Banks released a press statement clarifying this was not the case, claiming the editing gave the wrong impression, and apologizing for "any confusion, anger or disappointment" it caused.

Ann is this season's breakout star, beginning the cycle with a five-show best picture streak unprecedented in Tyra-town. Her waifish face, slightly large ears, and super-tall super-skeletal frame endeared her to fashion houses and photographers, though she suffered whenever a challenge required her to speak in public.

— Los Angeles Times

Ward was the first call-out for best photo for the first five weeks of the show, a Top Model first. However, although her photos were lauded, she was also noted for her shyness, insecurity and awkwardness outside of photo shoots, as well as her difficulty during challenges that required talking. The Los Angeles Times described her as "the most reclusive and shy model to get this far in a cycle to date".

In the season finale, Ward and fellow contestant Chelsey Hersley filmed a CoverGirl Lash Blast Fusion commercial and participated in a Roberto Cavalli fashion show. To that point, Ward had not won any of the show's challenges, while Hersley had won three, even though Ward had been called first in panel six times (five of them in a row) and Chelsey not even once. Ward was crowned the Cycle 15 winner of America's Next Top Model. As a result, she received a $100,000 contract with CoverGirl Cosmetics, a contract with IMG Models, the cover of Beauty in Vogue, fashion spreads in Vogue Italia and Beauty in Vogue, as well as a prominent feature on the Vogue Italia website, Vogue.it. An emotional Ward said the victory was especially gratifying because she was mocked in her childhood for being "too tall [and] not normal", to which judge and fashion photographer Nigel Barker said, "Guess what? You're not normal. You're 'America's Next Top Model.'"

== Post-ANTM career ==
=== Modelling ===
After her victory to become the 15th season winner of America's Next Top Model, she covered various magazines and spreads, campaigns, and walked multiple fashion shows across America, Europe, Africa, and Asia.

Ward's cover of Beauty in Vogue was published in May 2011 and her editorial in Vogue Italia was published in March 2011, shot by Ellen Von Unwerth; instead of having a two-page spread, she received a seven-page spread in Vogue Italia. Ward was featured on the cover of Velvet Magazine in fall of 2011.

She walked for Alex London with Jane Randall, Alexandria Everett and Hannah Jones. She was featured in the season finale of America's Next Top Model, Cycle 16 in the fashion show for Vivienne Westwood with the season's finalists. In October 2013, Ward walked in a fashion show called Desfile Google+PV14, and wore Pineda Covalin's 2014 collection.

Ward has been included in various retrospective lists regarding the best America's Next Top Model contestants. Marie Claire included Ward on a list of the 24 best American's Next Top Model contestants, commenting that she "glowed with charisma in spite of—or, really because of—her physical awkwardness."

=== Post-Modelling ===
Ward has been noted to enjoy drawing and sharing her art onto her Tumblr, Instagram, and Twitter accounts. The New York Times additionally wrote that Ward live streams herself drawing comic and anime characters.

Currently, Ward works as an illustrator and graphic designer for comic books, video games, and animated short films.

Preceded by Krista White	America's Next Top Model winner Cycle 15 (2010)	Succeeded by Brittani Kline
