= America's Next Top Model season 16 =

America's Next Top Model
- Season 16
- Judges: Tyra Banks; Nigel Barker; André Leon Talley
- No. of contestants: 14
- Winner: Brittani Kline
- No. of episodes: 13

Release
- Original network: The CW
- Original release: February 23 – May 18, 2011

Additional information
- Filming dates: October 23 – December 6, 2010

Season chronology
- ← Previous; Season 15 Next → Season 17

The sixteenth cycle of America's Next Top Model premiered on February 23, 2011, and was the tenth cycle to be aired on The CW. The catch-phrase for this cycle is "Rainy Day Women."

The prizes for this cycle were:

- A modeling contract with IMG Models.
- A fashion spread in Vogue Italia, and both the cover and a spread in Beauty In Vogue, and will be featured on Vogue.it.
- A US$100,000 contract with CoverGirl cosmetics.

All three permanent judges from the previous cycle – Vogue editor-at-large André Leon Talley, photographer Nigel Barker and Tyra Banks herself – remain.

The international destination for this cycle is Marrakesh, Morocco. The show's first visit to Africa since cycle 4, as well in Northern Africa and the Arab world.

The winner was 19-year-old Brittani Kline from Beech Creek, Pennsylvania with Molly O'Connell placing as the runner-up.

== Contestants ==
(ages stated are at start of contest)

Contestant	Age	Height	Hometown	Finish	Place
Angelia Alvarez	20	1.78 m (5 ft 10 in)	Pembroke Pines, Florida	Episode 1	14
Ondrei Edwards	18	1.70 m (5 ft 7 in)	Muskegon, Michigan	Episode 2	13 (quit)
Nicole Lucas	20	1.80 m (5 ft 11 in)	Orlando, Florida	Episode 2	12
Dominique Waldrup	23	1.80 m (5 ft 11 in)	Houston, Texas	Episode 3	11
Sara Longoria	18	1.78 m (5 ft 10 in)	Edinburg, Texas	Episode 4	10
Dalya Morrow	21	1.75 m (5 ft 9 in)	Clear Lake, Texas	Episode 5	9
Monique Weingart	19	1.83 m (6 ft 0 in)	Hebron, Illinois	Episode 6	8
Mikaela Schipani	21	1.74 m (5 ft 8 1/2 in)	Boca Raton, Florida	Episode 7	7
Jaclyn Poole	20	1.78 m (5 ft 10 in)	Belton, Texas	Episode 8	6
Katarzyna 'Kasia' Pilewicz	26	1.76 m (5 ft 9 1/2 in)	Wheaton, Illinois	Episode 10	5
Alexandria Everett	21	1.78 m (5 ft 10 in)	Huntington Beach, California	Episode 11	4
Hannah Jones	20	1.78 m (5 ft 10 in)	Houston, Texas	Episode 12	3
Molly O'Connell	22	1.78 m (5 ft 10 in)	Charleston, South Carolina	Episode 13	2
Brittani Kline	19	1.79 m (5 ft 10 1/2 in)	Beech Creek, Pennsylvania	Episode 13	1

== Episodes ==
No. overall	No. in season	Title	Original release date	US viewers (millions)
187	1	"Erin Wasson"	February 23, 2011	2.25
Tyra decided to teach the contestants about rejection in the modeling industry, so pretended to send them home at casting week, before revealing to them that they, were in fact, the top 14 contestants. The top fourteen contestants were immediately moved to the top model house where they briefly got to know one another. The contestants were taken to a resort where they met with Jay Manuel and model Erin Wasson, from whom found out that they were to participate runway show presented by J. Alexander, wearing designs by Alexander Wang. The contestants were to walk while inside a plastic bubble on a twelve-inch-wide runway over water. The contestants were then introduced to Russel James, the photographer for their backstage photoshoot. Most of the contestants pleased Alexander and Wasson with their impressive performances. However, Dominique and Ondrei were criticized for falling over while walking. Brittani was hailed as the best performer for her walk and won the challenge. After the show all of the girls received pieces of jewelry from Erin Wasson's collection. At the panel Brittani, Mikaela, Molly, Alexandria, Hannah, and Dalya received praise for their photos. Kasia was castigated for not utilizing her full figured body. Jaclyn received a great shot but her film was criticized. Meanwhile, Dominique and Angelia found themselves in the bottom two: Dominique for falling on the runway and not producing a good shot despite her personality and Angelia for looking "pretty" and not a model-esque. Dominique's personality saved her and Angelia was the first contestant to be sent home.: Featured photographer: Russell James; Special guest: Erin Wasson, Abby Roll
188	2	"Alek Wek"	March 2, 2011	1.96
Tyra visited the house, and introduced the contestants to her nutritionist Heather Bauer, who taught the contestants about “cheaties” – healthy but tasty alternatives appropriate for a top model's diet. Later, Monique and Dalya discovered a plate of rotting chicken in the refrigerator and conflict broke out between Dalya and Alexandria, who thought that Dalya was patronizing her. Later, the contestants were taken to The Colony Theatre in Burbank as they were asked to draw a picture of their inner critic, and then confront them, with Eugene acting as the critic. Ondrei broke down, upset about her brothers, while Molly revealed that she was adopted. After the teach was over, each of the girls were given earrings as a reward for doing well in such an emotional situation. Next, the girls were taken to their photo-shoot, where they would be modeling jewelry while surrounded by bees. Monique impressed Jay with her strong poses and facial expressions. Hannah was reduced to tears during the shoot, feeling under pressure to perform well, while Jaclyn worried about her bee sting allergy. After the shoot, Ondrei contemplated leaving the competition, stating that she wanted to compete, but that her traumatic past continued to haunt her. At panel, Ondrei told the judges that she wanted to leave. The judges were supportive, and Ondrei quit the competition. Tyra informed the remaining contestants that if Ondrei's photo was deemed the weakest, there would be no elimination for the week. If not, there would still be an elimination. As judging continued, Dalya and Nicole are in the bottom two. Dalya for producing a largely unusable film, despite a decent picture, and Nicole for once again photographing much older than she looked in person. Tyra revealed that Ondrei's photo had not been deemed the worst in the group, and that one of the bottom two would be leaving. Nicole was the second contestant eliminated.: Featured photographer: Mike Rosenthal; Special guest: Alek Wek, Heather Bauer, Eugene Buica, Kim Ki-Seok, Scott J. Cunha, Vincent Oquendo
189	3	"Lori Goldstein"	March 9, 2011	2.24
The contestants were taken to the Privé salon in Los Angeles, and although most of the girls were satisfied with their new looks, Sara was disappointed not to get a weave and Alexandria expressed her concerns about how she thought her stylist should be fixing her hair, though she was ultimately happy with the overall result. An independent stylist was brought in specifically for Molly's advanced weave, but the style was universally panned, and Molly angrily expressed her disdain at her new look. The contestants were tasked for their photo shoot at the farm, and learned to be shooting in groups. Alexandria was unhappy before her shoot with Monique after discovering a pimple, and was criticized for her unacceptable attitude by Pamela and Lori. Sara and Mikaela were pleased to be shooting together, but struggled to pull off a good shot as a pair. In the only group with three girls, Jaclyn and Dalya worked well together, but Dominique struggled to gain inspiration, and Jay noted that she had essentially become a spare part in the shoot. At panel, most of the contestants received positive feedback from their shoots. Alexandria's stunning shot earned her the first call, but Tyra warned her that her bad attitude would not be tolerated in the future. Molly also received huge praise and was promised that her weave would be redone, much to her relief. Brittani & Hannah's photo was deemed the best in terms of a group shot, Kasia, Jaclyn, Monique, and Dalya also impressed. Dominique's nerves and Sara's lack of self-confidence landed them in the bottom two, but Sara was deemed to have more potential, and Dominique was sent packing after two bottom two appearances.: Featured photographer: Troy Jensen (makeovers), Pamela Hanson (photoshoot); Special guest: Lori Goldstein, Laurent D, Molly Stern, Michael Kanyon
190	4	"Francesco Carrozzini"	March 16, 2011	2.03
The contestants returned from panel. Brittani was glad about her previous placements. Sara was angry with how their hair hadn't gotten longer, and they thought that it was the reason they performed poorly in the previous photoshoot. The following day they went to a runway challenge where they learned they would walk with their hands on fire, as well as a flaming runway wearing the collections of Geoffrey Mac. Brittani, Alexandria, and Dalya were praised for their great performances, but Dalya won the main prize. Kasia, Hannah, and Sara were made to walk home because they performed so weakly. When they got home, they got a script for a retro-sexy themed Fierce Roast coffee commercial. Kasia and Hannah impressed, while Alexandria controlled everything, even the lights. Brittani was chastised for not standing out and Sara was for not being sexy. At panel, Kasia received the first call-out after praised her commercial was acclaimed, while Alexandria and Sara found themselves in the bottom two; Alexandria for controlling everything, especially after last week when the stylist complained of her for the same reason and Sara for their lack of sexiness and commitment in the commercial. In the end, Alexandria was saved, but Tyra warned her that there would be no more reprieves if her excuses continued, and Sara was eliminated in her second consecutive bottom two appearance.: Featured photographer: Francesco Carrozzini; Special guest: Patti Bortoli, Megan Weems, Roberto Carneiro, Mark Chadwick, Melissa Rogers, Franck Chevalier
191	5	"Rachel Zoe"	March 23, 2011	2.21
Following her appearance in the bottom two at the previous panel, Alexandria rued how she was being perceived by the judges, but the other contestants all felt that the judges had her personality down correctly, and joked that they should let her fall on her own sword, and talk her way out of the competition. Despite having it redone, Molly was still unhappy with her hair weave, and revealed how it had made her scalp swell. The contestants were taken to a CoverGirl challenge, where the contestants were put into teams to shoot promotional videos for CoverGirl foundation. The contestants were sorted in teams of three, with each member taking on a different role in the team - director, writer, or talent. Alexandria frustrated her teammates by trying to control of all roles, but Monique was praised for managing to do well in spite of Alexandria's interference. In the end, the group of Brittani, Kasia and Mikaela won the challenge, and the opportunity for their video to be shown on the CoverGirl website. Back at the house, Alexandria tearfully called her boyfriend, feeling misunderstood in the house, but while she did so, the other girls gossiped about her, and Monique decided to read her diary, to find out how she really felt about the other contestants. For their next photo shoot, the contestants were taken to Los Angeles Zoo, where they were to pose for Rachel Zoe's faux fur collection, and learned that they would be shooting with Murato, a baby jaguar. Kasia experienced the most difficulty posing with the jaguar due to her being allergic to animals, whilst Dalya was accused of only doing basic poses. Molly was unhappy about being the penultimate girl to shoot, as she felt that the jaguar had grown increasingly frustrated as the day has gone on, giving the contestants who shot first an advantage. At panel, Brittani, Jaclyn and Monique all received positive feedback, but Hannah received top praise for her stellar photograph who received her first call-out. Dalya received the worst feedback, as the judges felt that she was doubting herself, and it was getting in the way of her performance, and she landed in the bottom two alongside Molly, for letting hair trouble distract her. Eventually Molly was saved, and was told that her weave would now be removed altogether.: Featured photographer: Baldomero Fernandez; Special Guest: Rachel Zoe, Vincent Oquendo, Wendy Debbas
192	6	"Sonia Dara"	March 30, 2011	2.18
The contestants returned from panel to be greeted by Tyra who wanted to teach the contestants about model archetypes, and how to handle the fame that might come to the contestants if they make it as successful contestants. During the lesson, Molly again became emotional about her weave, but Tyra told her that she needed to tough it out and stop complaining, and later, it was finally taken out for good, much to Molly's delight. The contestants were next taken to their next challenge, where J. Alexander told them that they would spend the afternoon meeting fans of the show. Monique quickly became bored with talking to the fans; when one asked her for a kiss, she instead directed him to Alexandria, who reluctantly kissed him on the cheek. Kasia won the challenge for being engaging with her fans, while still keeping the conversation mostly about modeling, and she chose Brittani and Jaclyn to join her in having dinner with Miss. J. The other contestants were left to clean up the mess left by the fans, causing Monique's disgruntlement. Some of the other girls then began to label her 'high maintenance'. The contestants would take for their photo shoot as they would be posing covered in mud. The contestants were shot in groups of four – four blondes in one group, four brunettes in the other. Jonathan was delighted with Brittani's work on set, and even took a shot of her alone, ignoring the other three contestants in her group. In between frames in the blond shoot, Alexandria moved Kasia's arm after Jay specifically told her how to position it, and she worried that Jay would relay this back to Tyra, after he took it as her trying to once again to dictate the shoot. At panel, both group shots received mixed responses from the judges, with Brittani and Kasia being told they were the standouts in their respective groups. Although the brunettes' photo was stronger deemed by the judges, Monique and Mikaela landed in the bottom two for coasting and inconsistency respectively. In the end, Mikaela was spared, with a warning to improve her eye expressions, and Monique, who the judges deemed a middle-runner, was eliminated.: Featured photographer: Jonathan Mannion; Special guest: Sonia Dara, Mitch Stone, Gloria Elias-Foeillet, Monique Peters
193	7	"Eric Daman"	April 6, 2011	1.89
After returning from panel, the contestants found bags underneath Brittani's digital portrait, filled with materials related to their upcoming challenge – a photo shoot for “Warriors in Pink”, a cause against breast cancer. The concept immediately inspired many of the contestants, including Brittani and Molly, who both had lost friends and loved ones to breast cancer. Mikaela admitted her confusion about how she was unable to get strong shots due to her extensive modeling experience, but vowed to improve at the next shoot. Alexandria continued to be unpopular amongst the contestants, and mostly everyone agreed that she should have been the one to go home at the previous panel. The contestants met Nigel at the shoot, and learned he would be their photographer for the day. Each contestant would be representing a warrior and would have to do their own hair and makeup. Before the shoot, Mikaela broke down in tears, but resolved to do a good job regardless. During their shoot, Nigel asked Brittani what she thought about whilst posing, and reacted negatively to her response of “I don't think, I just do,” feeling that Brittani wasn't passionate enough about modeling. Hannah was criticized for being unmemorable during the shoot. Alexandria on the other hand impressed Nigel, and ultimately won the prize – the chance to shoot a national campaign for “Warriors in Pink”, as well as a new 2012 Ford Focus. Following the result, the other contestants, led by Brittani, softly, but angrily bemoaned the choice of Alexandria winning, feeling that she was undeserving, and when Alexandria defensively told them she could hear what they were saying, this provoked Brittani, who exploded in anger, and told her that none of the contestants liked her, and that they felt she should have gone home instead of Monique at last panel, shocking Nigel, who had also overheard everything. Back at the house, the models pondered how to best deal with Alexandria, and when she returned from her campaign shoot, they all gave her the silent treatment, though in a confessional, Alexandria claimed that this only further pushed her on to do well. Next, Miss J. crept into the model's home in the early hours, and whisked them away for a tour of Universal Studios, where they would be shooting for this week's photo. Each girl had to portray women who are addicted to certain fashion items. Mikaela struggled get into character, being overwhelmed by the piles of shopping bags around her. Jaclyn impressed Jay the most, embodying her assignment to the fullest extent. At panel, Jaclyn received amazing critique for her “crazy for makeup” shoot, while Molly and Kasia also received good feedback. Hannah was commended for pulling out an excellent “crazy for handbags” shot, but Tyra warned her that her overall film was poor. Mikaela again struggled with inconsistency in her film, and she admitted she was never totally sure about the concept of the shot. During Alexandria's critique with the judges, Nigel called Brittani out over her outburst at the challenge, and deemed her unprofessional for airing her personal opinions in the workplace. Although Brittani attempted to defend her actions, Tyra agreed with Nigel, leading to Brittani fleeing out of the judging panel, and breaking down backstage. Soon after, Brittani returned to get her critique in the middle of a panic attack, and attempted to apologize to the judges for her actions. Her picture was generally well received by the judges, but her professionalism was called into question, with Tyra feeling that her outburst had made her appear unattractive to the judges. During deliberation, Tyra recalled the elimination of Toccara Jones in Cycle 3, and how she had been outnumbered by the other judges that day. Tyra said that Brittani was her choice to be eliminated, but again found herself in the minority, with the other three judges hoping that Brittani would learn from her experience. Backstage, Alexandria confronted the other contestants, and after asking them why they disliked her so much, Brittani stormed out once again. After the fight, Jaclyn received the first call-out for her excellent picture, while Molly, Hannah, Kasia, and Alexandria all safely progressed to the next round. Tyra praised Alexandria for the way she handled herself throughout the difficult panel and that she would have been called much sooner if she showed more feeling in her eyes. Mikaela and Brittani were called forward as the bottom two; Mikaela for her declining performance, and Brittani for being unprofessional despite taking strong pictures each week. Ultimately, Tyra handed the final photo to Brittani, stating that if she had not been outvoted, Mikaela would have stayed and Brittani would have been eliminated.: Featured photographers: Nigel Barker (challenge), Miguel Starcevich (photoshoot); Special guests: Eric Daman, Marie-Flore Beaubien, Desirae Cherman
194	8	"Lana Marks"	April 13, 2011	2.08
Following the previous panel near disaster, Tyra helped the contestants put together portfolios for their impending go-sees, and after giving each contestant their portfolio, informed them that each portfolio contained a letter of the name of their cycle's overseas destination. The contestants unscrambled the letters and found out that they would be going to Morocco. But Tyra then announced that only five girls would be going to overseas, with the girls performance at go-sees playing a major part in the judge's deliberations at panel. At the house, the contestants met Kyle Hagler from IMG Models, who gave them their brief for the go-sees. Each contestant had four hours to visit four different castings, each representing a different archetype of modeling – Athletic, Bombshell, Couture, and Girl Next Door, before returning to Lana Marks for one final go-see. Each contestant was given a driver for the challenge, but was told that they had to direct the drivers to the go-sees. Alexandria found this to be an advantage, as she was the only girl who had a pre-existing knowledge of L.A, claiming she knew it like the back of her hand. All of the contestants made it back to Lana Marks in time, including Alexandria who arrived with only 30 seconds to spare, and Kyle informed the contestants that only the three who performed the best throughout the day would move onto a go-see with Lana, for the chance to appear in a global campaign, as well as a gift bag from the designers. Alexandria, Kasia, and Molly moved onto the top three, and after a go-see with Lana, Alexandria was named as the challenge winner. At the house, Brittani felt resigned to going home, feeling that her failure to progress past the first round at go-sees, on top of her performance at the previous panel would eliminate her. Next, the contestants were taken to the Olinda Landfill to be taking part in their photo shoot. The contestants would be wearing couture dresses designed specifically by Michael Cinco for each contestant. Before their shoot, Nigel reassured Brittani that she was still in the competition because the judges felt she was worth keeping, but warned her that it was pivotal that she get a good shot. In spite of their surroundings, most of the contestants impressed Nigel and Jay, but Molly's complaining detracted from her strong performance. At the panel, Alexandria received a strong performance earned her second first call-out of the competition. Hannah, Kasia and Brittani also safely progressed to the next round, joining Alexandria on the plane to Morocco. Tyra praised Brittani for her “amazing photo” as well as coming “a long way” since the last panel, despite only attending and booking two go-sees. Jaclyn and Molly landed in the bottom two. Jaclyn for attending only two go-sees, despite booking both and Molly for her personality in the go-sees. Ultimately, Molly was saved and Jaclyn was eliminated in her first ever bottom two appearance.: Featured photographer: Nigel Barker; Special Guest: Lana Marks, Kyle Hagler, Daniella Clarke, Rachel Williams, Oday Shakar, Jerry Avenaim, Michael Cinco, Bruce Grayson
195	9	"Highlights and Catfights"	April 20, 2011	1.58
This is the recap episode of the cycle chronicling the first eight episodes, plus never before seen footage of this cycle.
196	10	"Franca Sozzani"	April 27, 2011	2.39
The top five contestants arrived in Marrakesh, Morocco and met the Jay's who informed them that they would be given the day off to see Morocco, and each of the contestants reflected on their position in the competition. Later, the contestants met with Andre, who asked the contestants to show him their walks in elaborate couture outfits designed by Noureddine Amir, and while most of the contestants did well, Kasia was upset to find that none of the dresses at the studio fitted her plus sized frame, but did a good job of hiding her hurt feelings from Andre. The contestants were then taken to a rooftop, where they again met Andre for a chat, before being surprised to learn that they were actually on the roof of their new luxury Marrakesh apartment. Molly however was unhappy when she learned that she would have to share a bed with Brittani and Kasia. The contestants' first overseas photoshoot on the outskirts of Moroccan dessert to pose on the back of camels. Molly attempted to improve her image around set, and impressed Jay with a strong performance, but Kasia struggled at the shoot, and admitted that she was feeling uncomfortable with her body. Alexandria was initially excited for the shoot, but her continuing control issues annoyed Michael, and she struggled to perform well. At panel, Molly, Brittani and Hannah were all praised for strong shots, with Hannah finally being told that she stood out, with her shoot being completely different from the other contestants. Alexandria received mixed comments on her shot, and was warned of the dangers of upsetting the photographer, while Kasia was criticized for lacking energy in her shot, and for letting her body issues get in the way of her performance. Alexandria and Kasia were called forward as the bottom two, Alexandria for not performing as well as some of the other contestants, and for her demeanor at set, and Kasia for being inconsistent from week-to-week, and lacking confidence. Ultimately, Kasia was sent home in her first ever bottom two appearance.: Featured photographer: Michael Wooley; Special Guest: Franca Sozzani, Noureddine Amir, Audrey Lambert, Vincent Jabes, Maria Cristina Petrone
197	11	"Daniella Issa Helayel"	May 4, 2011	1.94
Miss J. arrived at the top model apartment, and escorted the contestants to an informal meeting with Franca Sozzani, the editor-in-chief of Vogue Italia, giving them the chance to ask her questions, and show her their portfolios. Next, J. introduced the contestants to Noor Talbi, a professional tea-tray dancer for their challenge is to teach them the art of balancing trays on their heads, informed them that they would have to demonstrate what they had learned in front of a live audience later that night. J. informed the contestants to have to balance lit candles on their trays, as well as dance with a professional group of tea-tray dancers. Molly struggled and tripped that she was slightly making little effort to recover, but Brittani excelled and managed to keep her tray balanced for her whole routine. Alexandria initially performed well, but dropped her tray completely in her final move. Brittani won the challenge and giving her the opportunity to have a personal runway lesson from J, along with Hannah, whom she chose to share the reward with. Later, the contestants were wandering through Marrakesh to eat with local delicacies, including eyeballs and goat's brain, Brittani regretted her decision at the restaurant, having fallen ill since eating there. At the photo shoot, Jay told the contestants that their shoot would be a continuation of the story behind their last shoot. Hannah struggled to successfully portray her story, while Molly and Brittani once again excelled. Alexandria was excited for the shoot, but became frustrated when Jay warned her not to be something other than a pretty contestant, and consequently her performance suffered. At panel, Alexandria received a mixed response for her photo, with the judges deeming it not high fashion, something which they also said of Brittani, though they still liked her picture. Hannah also had a decent picture, but the judges again worried that she was not a standout. Molly impressed them the most with her high fashion shot, and she earned the first call-out. Hannah and Alexandria were named as the bottom two, both for control issues – Alexandria for being too controlling in her face at her shoots, and Hannah for lacking control to be consistent. Ultimately, Hannah was given a reprieve while Alexandria was sent home from the competition in her third bottom two appearance.: Featured photographer: Friedemann Hauss; Special Guest: Daniella Issa Helayel, Franca Sozzani, Noor Talbi, Vincent Jabes, Audrey Lambert
198	12	"Ivan Bart"	May 11, 2011	2.03
The top three contestants received a video message from Lara Spencer of The Insider on their week's challenge as they would have to research one of three fashion and beauty methods common in Marrakesh, and then shoot an informative 1½-minute video report about their selected topic. Brittani was criticized for not utilizing her expert fully and running from inside to the outer market while the camera followed her, causing her to run over her allotted time. Molly was commended for finishing her report within the 1½ minute, although she was reminded to maximize her time. Hannah impressed with her video but likewise went over the allotted time. Ultimately, Molly won the challenge. Tyra visited the contestants on how coping in their personal issues such as Molly became emotional on missing her family, Brittani revealed that she had been bullied as a child because of her mom's anxiety issues. After the chat, Tyra held an impromptu photo shoot with the contestants, and helped them to isolate parts of their bodies without moving other parts. The contestants then arrived for the week's photo shoot, where they would be posing on the beach with a male model in traditional Moroccan wedding gowns. Hannah impressed on getting conflicted narrative for her shoot. Brittani again felt uncomfortable with the idea of acting sexy, and began to cry mid-shoot after being accused of being overconfident by Jay. At panel, Tyra informed the contestants to give evaluations Molly produced two beautiful shots, though Nigel admitted he didn't enjoy shooting her, while Hannah produced some of her best pictures in the competition so far. Brittani excelled once again, and was commended for excellent posing, though Nigel scolded her for crying during the shoot. Brittani and Hannah are in the bottom two, and Hannah was the last contestant sent home.: Featured photographer: Tyra Banks, Nigel Barker; Special Guest: Lara Spencer, Ivan Bart, Younes Tazi, Audrey Lambert, Vincent Jabes
199	13	"Season Finale"	May 18, 2011	1.81
The final two had to do for a CoverGirl Lip Perfection commercial and print ad. Next, the final two then met stylist Valentina Serra and top fashion photographer Pierpaolo Ferrari for their Vogue Italia cover shoots. Later that night, Molly was surprised to meet her adoptive parents, while Brittani's mother was not able to go to Morocco for medical reasons as she was talked to her mother via Skype. The final two were joined by cycle 15 winner Ann Ward, as well as previously eliminated contestants Kasia, Alexandria and Hannah for the Vivienne Westwood fashion show. Though both contestants excelled throughout the whole show, Brittani accidentally went out of character by laughing while doing a semi-erotic pose with Molly. Brittani stumbled at the penultimate part of the show, injuring herself, though she decided to perform in the final walk anyway. After the show, Ivan Bart surprised the contestants by announcing that they would have a second set of makeovers before facing the judges, much to the contestants' surprise. Some of the contestants' hair was cut short. At the final judging, Brittani was hailed for doing well in the CoverGirl commercial, while Molly was accused for looking mean. For their fashion show, the final two were hailed for their strong performances. During deliberations, the judges were torn because the final two displayed equally strong bodies of work. Their portfolios were neck and neck, with Molly's being slightly higher. They considered Brittani romantic, while Molly was hard. Brittani was named the winner of America's Next Top Model.: Featured photographer: Pierpaolo Ferrari; Special Guest: Ivan Bart, Valentina Serra, Ann Ward

== Summaries ==
=== Call-out order ===
Order	Episodes											
Order	1	2 (Note: In episode 2, Ondrei quit the competition when she was called forward for her individual evaluation at judging panel.)	3	4	5	6	7	8	10	11	12	13
1	Molly	Hannah	Alexandria	Kasia	Hannah	Brittani	Jaclyn	Alexandria	Molly	Molly	Molly	Brittani
2	Brittani	Brittani	Molly	Hannah	Brittani	Kasia	Molly	Hannah	Brittani	Brittani	Brittani	Molly
3	Alexandria	Monique	Brittani	Jaclyn	Jaclyn	Molly	Hannah	Kasia	Hannah	Hannah	Hannah	
4	Mikaela	Mikaela	Kasia	Dalya	Monique	Jaclyn	Kasia	Brittani	Alexandria	Alexandria		
5	Dalya	Kasia	Jaclyn	Monique	Alexandria	Hannah	Alexandria	Molly	Kasia			
6	Hannah	Dominique	Hannah	Molly	Kasia	Alexandria	Brittani	Jaclyn				
7	Ondrei	Sara	Monique	Mikaela	Mikaela	Mikaela	Mikaela					
8	Monique	Alexandria	Dalya	Brittani	Molly	Monique						
9	Nicole	Jaclyn	Mikaela	Alexandria	Dalya							
10	Kasia	Molly	Sara	Sara								
11	Jaclyn	Dalya	Dominique									
12	Sara	Nicole										
13	Dominique	Ondrei										
14	Angelia											

The contestant won the challenge
The contestant was eliminated
The contestant quit the competition
The contestant won the competition

=== Bottom two ===
Episode	Contestants	Eliminated
1	Angelia & Dominique	Angelia
2	Dalya & Nicole	Ondrei
2	Dalya & Nicole	Nicole
3	Dominique & Sara	Dominique
4	Alexandria & Sara	Sara
5	Dalya & Molly	Dalya
6	Mikaela & Monique	Monique
7	Brittani & Mikaela	Mikaela
8	Jaclyn & Molly	Jaclyn
10	Alexandria & Kasia	Kasia
11	Alexandria & Hannah	Alexandria
12	Brittani & Hannah	Hannah
13	Brittani & Molly	Molly

The contestant was eliminated after their first time in the bottom two
The contestant was eliminated after their second time in the bottom two
The contestant was eliminated after their third time in the bottom two
The contestant quit the competition
The contestant was eliminated in the final judging and placed as the runner-up

=== Average call-out order ===
Casting call-out order and final two are not included.

Rank by average	Place	Model	Call-out total	Number of call-outs	Call-out average
1	1	Brittani	34	11	3.09
2	3	Hannah	35	11	3.18
3	2	Molly	40	11	3.64
4	5	Kasia	40	9	4.44
5	4	Alexandria	46	10	4.60
6	6	Jaclyn	42	8	5.25
7	8	Monique	35	6	5.83
8	7	Mikaela	45	7	6.43
9	13	Ondrei	7	1	7.00
10	9	Dalya	37	5	7.40
11	10	Sara	39	4	9.75
12	11	Dominique	30	3	10.00
13	12	Nicole	21	2	10.50
14	14	Angelia	14	1	14.00

=== Photo shoot guide ===
- Episode 1 photo shoot: Backstage of a fashion show shot by Russell James
- Episode 2 photo shoot: Extreme beauty shots with bees & jewelry
- Episode 3 photo shoot: Alice in Wonderland inspired couture dresses and gowns by Lori Goldstein in groups on a ranch
- Episode 4 commercial: Retro-style coffee commercial
- Episode 5 photo shoot:' Rachel Zoe's faux fur with a baby jaguar
- Episode 6 photo shoot: Blondes vs. Brunettes covered in mud
- Episode 7 photo shoot: Crazies for fashion in Universal Studios
- Episode 8 photo shoot: Eco-friendly couture in a landfill
- Episode 10 photo shoot: Nomads posing on a camel
- Episode 11 photo shoot: Moroccan women In Jemaa el-Fnaa
- Episode 12 photo shoot: Love story on a Marrakesh beach with a male model
- Episode 13 photo shoot and commercial: CoverGirl Lip Perfection Lipcolor commercial and print ad, and Beauty In Vogue spread

=== Makeovers ===
- Dominique - Long curly dark red weave with matching eyebrows
- Sara - Cut shorter and dyed dark brown
- Dalya - Long straight black weave
- Monique - Long wavy fusion bond extensions
- Mikaela - Pocahontas inspired long straight black extensions; later, extensions removed
- Jaclyn - Volumized curls
- Kasia - Taylor Swift inspired crimped blonde extensions
- Alexandria - Long straight blonde extensions
- Hannah - Blonde highlights and eyebrows lightened
- Molly - Diana Ross inspired long curly platinum blonde weave; later, weave removed, later, cut short
- Brittani - Bob cut with bangs and dyed black; later, pixie cut

== Cast members ==
- J. Alexander – runway coach
- Jay Manuel – photo shoot director

== Post-Top Model careers ==
- Nicole Lucas worked overseas in Singapore & signed to Avenue Model Management (going by the name of Chloe). She has appeared in Elle Singapore, Style Magazine, Luxx Magazine, and walked for various designers in the Asia markets.
- Dalya Morrow has signed with Wünder Model Management.
- Monique Weingart was asked to participate in the All-Star cycle along with Alexandria, but she declined.
- Mikaela Schipani has been signed with I Model Management, Paragon Models in Mexico and Ford Models in Miami. She also signed with Fenton Moon NY along with Andrea Debevc and Natasha Galkina and have Fashion Week S/S 2013 Show Cards for New York S/S 2013.
- Jaclyn Poole signed with Models International, but as of 2020 she had left the fashion industry and currently works as a grade school teacher.
- Alexandria Everett participated in America's Next Top Model, cycle 17: All-Stars along with other returning models. She finished 7th place overall.
- Hannah Kat Jones met her manager at ThirdHill Entertainment and Hannah signed with Paradigm, booking a guest star role as Carrie on the Disney Channel show, Austin & Ally. Hannah has also hosted for "TMI", a sketch comedy show at Second City in Hollywood.
- Molly O'Connell was originally chosen to participate in the All-Stars cycle, but the day of the live judging in episode one was the same day as the cycle 16 finale airing. The producers then switched her out with Alexandria for spoiler purposes. She also joined the cast for the tenth season of the Bravo reality series, Southern Charm.
- Brittani Kline is currently signed with Muse Model Management in New York, Premier Model Management in London, Why Not Models in Milan, Paragon Model Management in Mexico City and P Models. She has walked for Balenciaga Resort and Prabal Gurung. She also appeared in Interview Magazine. She used to be signed with IMG Models in New York City under the name of "Autumn" but her contract was terminated. She appeared in a Vogue Mexico advertorial for United Colors of Benetton. Her Beauty In Vogue and Vogue Italia spreads were published in November 2011.

== Controversies ==
According to winner Brittani Kline, when the contestants were in Morocco, the show “started punishing girls for whenever they didn't win the challenge of the day”. She claims that the producers “said ‘since you lost and didn't indulge in the Moroccan culture, we're gonna make you indulge in the culture’. So me and this other girl had to play butcher: literally.” She recounts that “There was a bulls head, there was some like organs, some bones on a table and they're like ‘put this into this wagon’. ‘Put the meat in the fridge and then take the wagon back to where it was’”. She continued, saying “It was me and this vegetarian girl and ... she's like ‘Oh my God!’. It took both of us to lift the bull head ... but that never got on the episode.”

During a fan meet and greet challenge, Monique was approached by a man who asked her to sign a photo and write on it that he was a good kisser. She declined but said that fellow contestant Alexandria would do it. After resisting the man's advances repeatedly, she finally gave in and let him have a kiss on the cheek. She was criticised by J. Alexander for this, who said this could lead onto “stalking”, which many deemed unfair, since she was heavily pressured by the man to do so.
