= Beech Creek, Pennsylvania =

Borough in Pennsylvania, US

- Borough
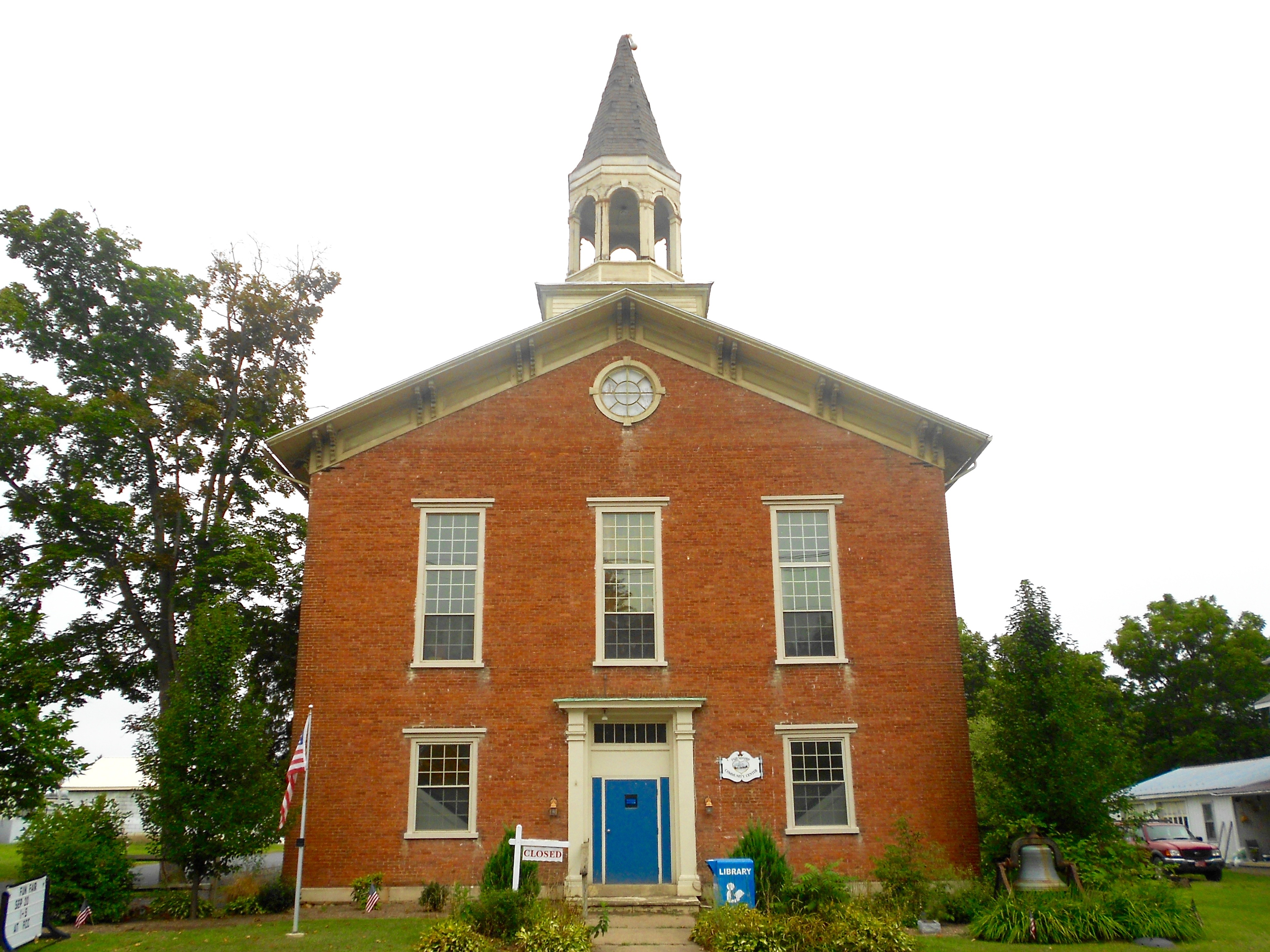
- Friendship Community Center

- Location in Clinton County and the U.S. state of Pennsylvania.
- Coordinates: 41°04′29″N 77°35′09″W
- Country: United States
- State: Pennsylvania
- County: Clinton
- Settled: 1812
- Incorporated (borough): 1868

Government
  - Type: Borough Council
  - Mayor: James Walker

Area
  - Total: 0.56 sq mi (1.44 km^{2})
  - Land: 0.54 sq mi (1.40 km^{2})
  - Water: 0.015 sq mi (0.04 km^{2})
- Elevation: 620 ft (190 m)

Population (2020)
  - Total: 736
  - Density: 1,358.1/sq mi (524.35/km^{2})
- Time zone: Eastern (EST)
  - Summer (DST): EDT
- ZIP Code: 16822
- Area code: 570
- FIPS code: 42-04984
- Website: www.beechcreekborough.com

Beech Creek is a borough in Clinton County, Pennsylvania, United States. As of the 2020 census, Beech Creek had a population of 736. It is the setting for Fun Home, a 2006 graphic memoir by Alison Bechdel, who grew up there. Brittani Kline, winner of America's Next Top Model, Cycle 16, was born there.

== Geography ==
Beech Creek is located in southwestern Clinton County at 41°4′29″N 77°35′9″W (41.074737, -77.585758), on the northeastern side of Beech Creek, a tributary of Bald Eagle Creek and part of the West Branch Susquehanna River watershed. Beech Creek (the waterway) forms the border between Clinton County and Centre County.

Pennsylvania Route 150 passes through the borough, leading northeast to Lock Haven, the Clinton County seat, and southwest 13 miles (21 km) to Interstate 80 near Milesburg.

According to the U.S. Census Bureau, the borough of Beech Creek has a total area of 0.56 square miles (1.44 km^{2}), of which 0.54 square miles (1.40 km^{2}) is land and 0.02 square miles (0.04 km^{2}), or 2.59%, is water.

== Demographics ==
Historical population
Census	Pop.	Note	%±
1870	384		—
1880	400		4.2%
1890	437		9.3%
1900	449		2.7%
1910	584		30.1%
1920	573		−1.9%
1930	590		3.0%
1940	592		0.3%
1950	574		−3.0%
1960	634		10.5%
1970	639		0.8%
1980	760		18.9%
1990	716		−5.8%
2000	717		0.1%
2010	701		−2.2%
2020	736		5.0%

As of the census of 2000, there were 717 people, 301 households, and 201 families residing in the borough. The population density was 1,295.9 inhabitants per square mile (500.3/km^{2}). There were 315 housing units at an average density of 569.3 per square mile (219.8/km^{2}). The racial makeup of the borough was 99.02% White, 0.14% African American, 0.14% Native American, 0.42% Asian, and 0.28% from two or more races.

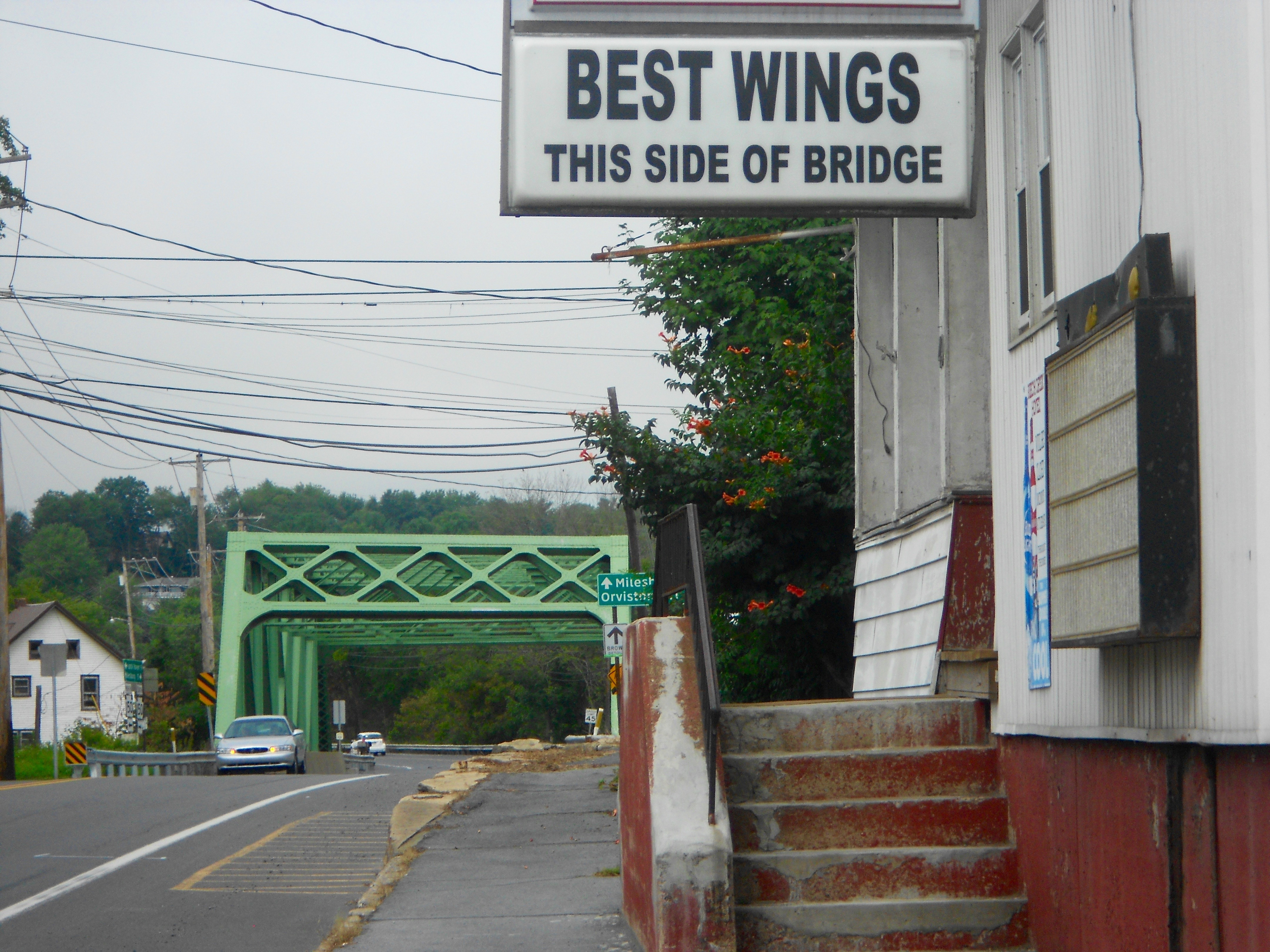
Restaurant sign by the bridge

There were 301 households, out of which 23.6% had children under the age of 18 living with them, 54.2% were married couples living together, 7.6% had a female householder with no husband present, and 33.2% were non-families. 28.6% of all households were made up of individuals, and 20.3% had someone living alone who was 65 years of age or older. The average household size was 2.38 and the average family size was 2.92.

In the borough the population was spread out, with 20.8% under the age of 18, 8.2% from 18 to 24, 26.8% from 25 to 44, 24.4% from 45 to 64, and 19.8% who were 65 years of age or older. The median age was 41 years. For every 100 females there were 92.2 males. For every 100 females age 18 and over, there were 90.6 males.

The median income for a household in the borough was $31,250, and the median income for a family was $39,167. Males had a median income of $25,441 versus $17,426 for females. The per capita income for the borough was $15,567. About 3.4% of families and 5.2% of the population were below the poverty line, including 8.8% of those under age 18 and 3.7% of those age 65 or over.

== Notable people ==
- Brittani Kline, fashion model
- Alison Bechdel, author
