= Jane Randall =

American model (born 1990)

- Born: Jane Elizabeth Randall; August 28, 1990 (age 36); Baltimore, Maryland, U.S.
- Spouse: Dylan Trotzuk (m. 2017)
- Modeling information
- Height: 5 ft 9 in (1.75 m)
- Hair color: Brown
- Eye color: Blue

Jane Elizabeth Randall (born August 28, 1990) is an American former fashion model from Baltimore, best known for her participation in the fifteenth cycle of America's Next Top Model where she tied for been the last contestant eliminated overall. She is now a New Jersey politics commentator.

== Early life ==
Randall was born in Baltimore, Maryland to parents Bill and Carol Randall. She graduated from the all-girls Roland Park Country School in 2008. In 2013, she graduated from Princeton University with a degree in history. Prior to modeling, she was a goalie for Princeton's varsity lacrosse team The Tigers. She is 5'9" tall.

== Modeling ==
=== America's Next Top Model ===
In 2010, Randall appeared on the fifteenth cycle of America's Next Top Model against 13 other contestants. She was personally selected by Tyra Banks after submitting her photo on Tyra.com. Randall competed in the competition the summer after her sophomore year at Princeton University. Though she was not one of the show's early front runners, Randall was noted as having showed marked improvement towards the end of the competition. She eventually reached the final four with fellow contestants Ann Ward, Chelsey Hersley and Kayla Ferrel. Tyra Banks lauded Randall for her strong modeling potential, but noted that she had been forgettable for a large part of the competition. Randall was eventually eliminated in a joint 3rd/4th place with Ferrel.

=== Post show career ===
Following her appearance on America's Next Top Model, Randall was signed with IMG Models in New York City, London, and Paris. She was also signed to PARS Management in Germany. She subsequently appeared in a number of fashion magazines, including Vogue Italia, Elle Mexico, Women's Wear Daily, and New York Times Style Magazine. She was also featured in a spread on the Vogue Italia website. She is now a New Jersey politics commentator on the Jersey Report., a Jersey-based clone of the Drudge Report.
