= Beech Creek (Pennsylvania) =

River in Pennsylvania, United States

Coordinates: 41°03′55″N 77°34′03″W

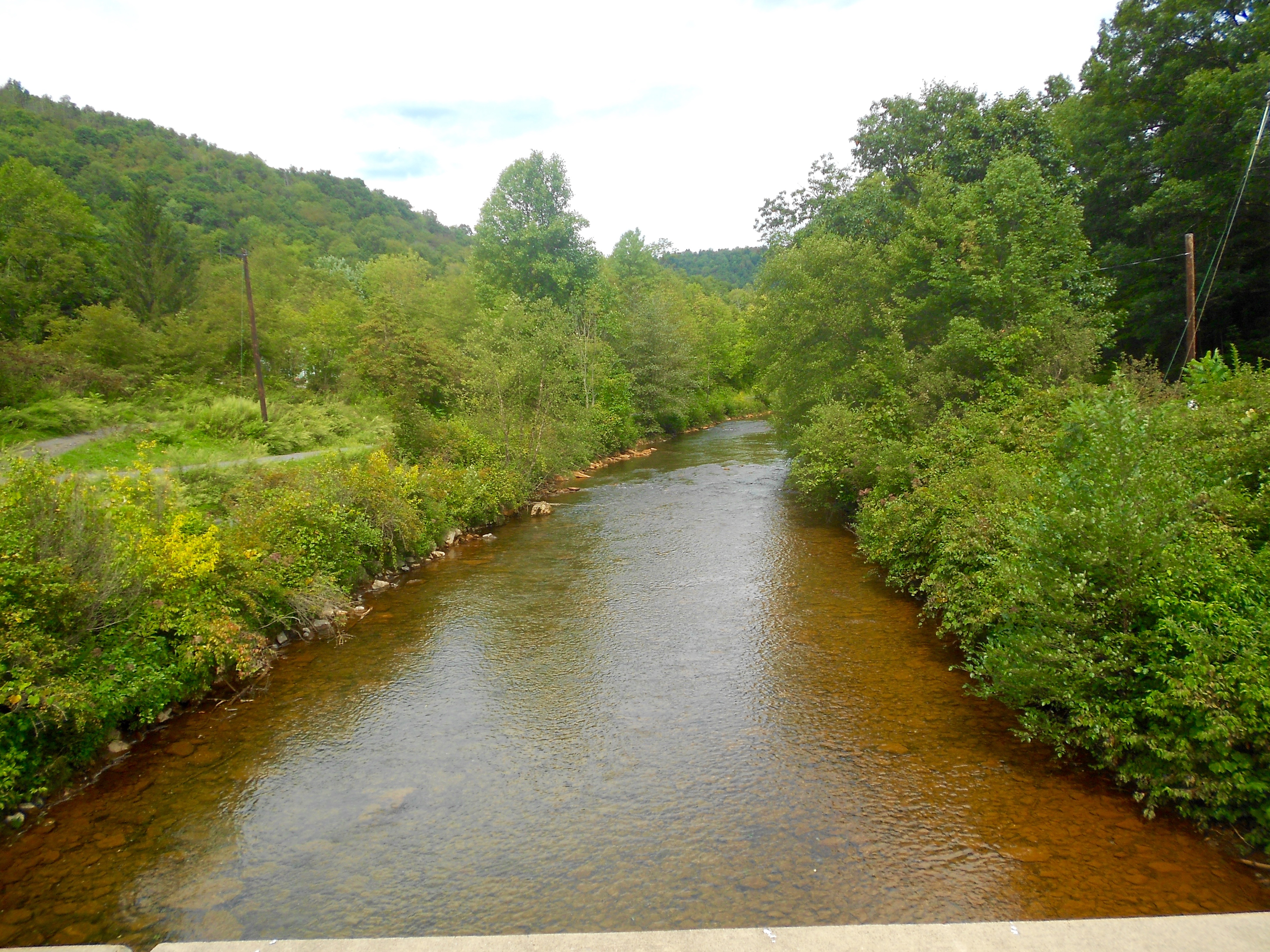
Beech Creek in Orivston

Beech Creek is a 27.3-mile-long (43.9 km) tributary of Bald Eagle Creek in Centre and Clinton counties, in Pennsylvania in the United States.

Via Bald Eagle Creek, its water flows to the West Branch Susquehanna River, then the Susquehanna River, and ultimately to the Chesapeake Bay.

Beech Creek is born at the confluence of the North and South Forks, 3.5 miles (5.6 km) upstream of Kato, and flows for 27.3 miles (43.9 km) to join Bald Eagle Creek, 1.8 miles (2.9 km) downstream of the borough of Beech Creek. The abandoned grade of the Beech Creek Railroad follows it along its length, running from its mouth up to the North Fork.

At one time it was called North Branch of the Bald Eagle. It was a thoroughfare for the lumber industry, which made canals alongside the stream so it could be useful during the low water season of summer. There are 3 towns alongside it: Beech Creek borough, and 2 villages: Orviston (Centre County), and Monument (Centre and Clinton Counties).

The lower half of the creek has no fish population due to high sulfur concentrations from coal industry. The creek is not clearing up as fish can't survive in the water. However, some small amounts of moss, mushrooms and wildlife on the banks are returning. Frogs, wolf spiders, bears, squirrels, snakes, groundhogs, bald eagles, deer, skunks, and many other Pennsylvania wildlife can be found alongside the stream, especially in its upper region. Animals tend to avoid drinking the water, but favor the contributing tributaries. Additionally, on Beech Creek Mountain, one can find active sulfur springs. Evidence is available on Sproul State Forest (41.111978, -77.664207). The south fork of the Beech Creek stream which flows in Centre County gets stocked with trout every year.

Beech Creek flows through Beech Creek Township (Clinton County), Liberty Township (Centre County), and Curtain Township (Centre county).

The stream is abundant with sandstones, flint and conglomerates, though in some spots clay can be found. Beech, oak, maple, ash, trembling willow and sumac trees grow along with elephant ear tall grass, fern, barberry and other plants like skunk cabbage. The stream is a good swimming stream but in certain spots it is posted,

== See also ==
- List of rivers of Pennsylvania
