= Sally Buck =

American owner of a baseball team (1930-2014)

Sara Long "Sally" Buck (1930 – August 23, 2014) was a part-owner of the Philadelphia Phillies baseball team. She and her late husband, Alexander Buck, joined the team's ownership group in 1981. She became a partner upon her husband's death in 2010.

She was the second Phillies part-owner to die within a year – the other was Claire Betz.

== Personal life ==
She was born in Baltimore, Maryland. She attended Roland Park Country School and later Goucher College. She died in Princeton, New Jersey at age 83. She married Alexander Buck in 1954.

She was an avid philanthrope and volunteer, helping with the Princeton Hospital, the Princeton Day School's Board of Trustees, the Contemporary Garden Club and Morven. She helped found the Horizon Foundation.
