= Brittani Kline =

American fashion model

- Born: May 19, 1991 (age 35); Beech Creek, Pennsylvania, U.S.
- Other name: Autumn
- Modeling information
- Height: 5 ft 10.5 in (1.79 m)
- Hair color: Auburn
- Eye color: Green
- Agency: Mother agent: Manny Roman (Roman Model Management); Silent Models (New York), Why Not Model Management (Milan), Premier Model Management (London), Freedom Models (Los Angeles), New Version Model Management (Florida)
- Website: http://www.brittkline.com/

Brittani Kline (born May 19, 1991) is an American fashion model. She is best known for winning cycle 16 of America's Next Top Model.

== Early life and education ==
Kline was born on May 19, 1991, in Beech Creek, Pennsylvania. She currently lives in Lock Haven, Pennsylvania.

== Career ==
=== Winning America's Next Top Model Cycle 16 ===
In 2011, at the age of 19, Kline was selected to appear to participate on Cycle 16 of the CW Network reality television show America's Next Top Model in which she competed against thirteen other aspiring contestants. Over her stay, she won three challenges (two individually and one with fellow contestants Kasia Pilewicz and Mikaela Schipani), received one first call-out, six second call-outs and one third call-out.

Kline garnered some negative attention after an angry confrontation on the set of a photoshoot for “Warriors in Pink”, between her and eventual All Stars contestant Alexandria Everett, during the cycle's seventh episode when Everett had won a challenge much to the dislike of all of the other girls. The heated verbal exchange between the two was brought up for discussion during that episode's deliberation by judge and photographer Nigel Barker and after being told by the judges about her behavior, Kline left the set in tears. Despite a strong photo, she ultimately landed in the bottom two for the first time ever with fellow contestant Mikaela Schipani (who had appeared for the second consecutive time due to surviving the previous week over Monique Weingart) however she was allowed to remain in the competition. Host Tyra Banks notably stated that had she not been outvoted by the other judges, Schipani would have remained in the competition and Kline would be eliminated. Despite being provoked for her outburst, Kline later apologized for her behavior the following week where fellow contestant Jaclyn Poole was eliminated before the top five departed for Morocco.

After Kline survived her second bottom two appearance over Hannah Jones, she eventually went on to become the winner of that cycle, winning a US$100,000 contract with CoverGirl Cosmetics, a contract with IMG Models, the cover of Beauty In Vogue and fashion spreads in Vogue Italia and Beauty In Vogue. Molly O'Connell was the runner-up upon Kline's win.

=== Post-show career ===
Kline stated that she would be going to Paris in June 2011 to shoot her Vogue Italia spread and moved to New York City with fellow contestant, and runner-up, Molly O'Connell in July 2011.

She had an advertorial for United Colors of Benetton in Vogue Mexico. She also had a spread in Vogue Italia, Beauty in Vogue, and a cover of Beauty in Vogue as part of her ANTM prize package. Kline announced on her official page on Facebook that she was leaving IMG Models due to health concerns and consequently her modeling career. She returned to her hometown in early 2012 to finish her degree. She lives with her boyfriend of five years, Erik, and two cats. She has since been removed from the IMG Models website.

In January 2013, she returned to modeling and signed with mother agent and photographer Manny Roman. Since then, she has signed with multiple agencies and has walked for Balenciaga and Prabal Gurung at NYFW. She also appeared twice in Interview and booked work for Acne Studios, Sportmax Code, and Bimba y Lola.

She attended Lock Haven University of Pennsylvania, studying Spanish language and English writing and graduating in December 2015 with honors and as a member of Sigma Tau Delta.

In 2017, Kline had a son named Rowan Hayes Fetter.

In 2022, Kline received a Master of Professional Studies degree from Penn State University.

Preceded by Ann Ward	America's Next Top Model winner Cycle 16 (2011)	Succeeded by Lisa D'Amato
