= America's Next Top Model season 15 =

America's Next Top Model
- Season 15
- Judges: Tyra Banks; Nigel Barker; André Leon Talley
- No. of contestants: 14
- Winner: Ann Ward
- No. of episodes: 13

Release
- Original network: The CW
- Original release: September 8 – December 1, 2010

Additional information
- Filming dates: June 8 – July 18, 2010

Season chronology
- ← Previous; Season 14 Next → Season 16

The fifteenth cycle of America's Next Top Model premiered on September 8, 2010 and was the ninth cycle to be aired on The CW network.

Several changes were made to the show in a bid to place greater emphasis on high fashion, including a lineup of prominent fashion industry guest judges and photographers as well as a change in prizes.

All three permanent judges from the previous cycle, Vogue editor-at-large André Leon Talley, photographer Nigel Barker and Tyra Banks, remained in place.

The prizes for this cycle included a modeling contract with IMG Models, a fashion spread in Vogue Italia, and both the cover and a spread in Beauty in Vogue, along with an editorial feature on Vogue.it, and a US$100,000 contract with CoverGirl cosmetics. The international destinations for this cycle are Venice, Milan and Como, all in Italy.

The winner of the competition was 19-year-old Ann Ward from Dallas, Texas with Chelsey Hersley placing as the runner up.

== Cast ==
=== Contestants ===
(Ages stated are at start of contest)

Contestant	Age	Height	Hometown	Finish	Place
Anamaria Mirdita	18	5 ft 10 in (1.78 m)	Astoria, New York	Episode 2	14
Terra White	24	5 ft 8.5 in (1.74 m)	Arlington, Texas	Episode 3	13
Sara Blackamore	21	5 ft 10 in (1.78 m)	Menifee, California	Episode 3	12
Rhianna Atwood	20	6 ft 1.5 in (1.87 m)	San Diego, California	Episode 4	11
Alexia 'Lexie' Tomchek	18	6 ft 0 in (1.83 m)	Geneva, Illinois	Episode 5	10
Kacey Leggett	20	5 ft 9 in (1.75 m)	Palmdale, California	Episode 6	9
Kendal Brown	23	5 ft 11 in (1.80 m)	Northport, Alabama	Episode 7	8
Esther Petrack	18	5 ft 9 in (1.75 m)	Boston, Massachusetts	Episode 8	7
Lyzbeth 'Liz' Williams	21	5 ft 10 in (1.78 m)	Arlington, Texas	Episode 9	6
Christin 'Chris' White	20	5 ft 10.5 in (1.79 m)	Arlington, Texas	Episode 10	5
Kayla Ferrel	19	5 ft 9 in (1.75 m)	Rockford, Illinois	Episode 11	4–3
Jane Randall	19	5 ft 9 in (1.75 m)	Baltimore, Maryland	Episode 11	4–3
Chelsey Hersley	22	5 ft 11 in (1.80 m)	Boise, Idaho	Episode 13	2
Ann Ward	19	6 ft 2 in (1.88 m)	Prosper, Texas	Episode 13	1

=== Judges ===
- Tyra Banks
- Nigel Barker
- André Leon Talley

=== Other cast members ===
- J. Alexander – runway coach
- Jay Manuel – creative director

== Episodes ==
No. overall	No. in season	Title	Original release date	US viewers (millions)
174	1	"Welcome to High Fashion"	September 15, 2010	2.88
32 contestants arrived in Los Angeles, California to begin the fifteenth cycle. Contestants included sisters Chris and Terra – the first sibling contestants since Amanda and Michelle (cycle 7). Kacey, who had been a contestant from cycle 11, and Vanessa Johnston, Miss Minnesota Teen USA 2009. Some notable participants shortly after the episode began. The contestants met Mr. & Ms. J in Palm Springs; later, they met Tyra. Their first challenge was a runway walk modeling clothes from Cynthia Rowley. The girls were split into categories as defined by the fashion industry – "quirky," "sexy," "strong bone structure," "browns," "blonds" and "brunettes" – and were tasked to stand out from their competition. Tensions rose when Kacey instigated Lexie to verbalize Jordan's supposed lack of desire for the competition, when it was in fact, just a misunderstanding, causing Lexie to be deemed malicious by some of the contestants. Also, Emily was questionably accused of being a racist. Later, the interviews commenced, and the group was pared down to 20 who moved on to a Cynthia Rowley garden party where they were paired up for a photo shoot. Later that night, the top 14 contestants were chosen.: Special guest: Cynthia Rowley
175	2	"Diane von Furstenberg"	September 15, 2010	2.88
The top 14 contestants arrived at Venice Beach, California, where they met Venice Beach icon Harry Perry, who passed them the keys to their new loft. Amongst the first few conversations in the house, Ann's awkwardness raised eyebrows, Anamaria admitted to taking a carbohydrate-restricted diet in order to remain thin, and Kayla revealed she was a lesbian. Afterwards, they were taken to the Hollywood and Highland Center, and were tasked to walk in a Diane von Furstenberg runway that is hoisted 4 stories in the air; they also had to do their own hair and makeup. Kacey faced some trouble when she was unable to see the end of the runway because of her myopia, but put on a strong performance nevertheless; and Anamaria fell on her way backstage. This week's photo shoot takes place at Smashbox Studios, themed on "Teen Bullying." Tyra and singer/actress Demi Lovato dropped by at the shoot to offer advice and raise awareness. Each contestant was drawn with a word that hurt her the most as a victim of bullying, as well as a "power word" that made her overcome it. At the photo shoot, Ann, Kayla and Chelsey were lauded for their performance, while Sara and Terra were criticized for looking plain and nervous respectively. Anamaria on the other hand was castigated for her overt thinness showing on film, which she ignored. At panel, Diane von Fürstenberg sat in as the guest judge. Ann, Kayla, Chelsey and Lexie's pictures received universal praise, and while Kendal's photo was deemed as not doing justice to her beauty, Diane would still hire her in an instant. In the end, Terra landed in the bottom two, but it was Anamaria's lack of regard for how thin she was that got her eliminated.: Featured photographer: Deborah Anderson; Special guests: Demi Lovato, Diane von Fürstenberg, Harry Perry, Isaac Prado, Anita Patrickson, Marky Andrews, Damien Carney
176	3	"Patricia Field"	September 22, 2010	2.82
Tyra dropped by at the house and informed the contestants that they would receive makeovers. Tyra also giving some clues for the contestants and which makeovers they will have, such as: Kayla will be given a new look that is fire like, Kendal will given "more sensuality and sexuality," Sara is getting darker than she is, both of Ann and Rhianna will given a look that make their edgy and quirky look more sophisticated, while Chris will given something that "flows her up." Panic ran through the house when Liz found a list of fantasy makeovers created by Ann, Lexie and Rhianna and assumed the credulous makeovers as genuine. However, their excitement quickly faded when they are told that whoever performed the worst at the post-makeover shoot would be eliminated. A large majority of contestants were satisfied by their new looks, except Liz and Terra, who were both averse to having a shorter hairstyle. Sara and Lexie struggled at the makeover shoot, but Terra was deemed the worst and was sent home. This week's photo shoot took place on the beaches of Malibu, where the girls posed as fallen angels while evoking different kinds of emotions. At panel, Patricia Field sat as the guest judge. A large majority of the photos receive mixed to negative critiques, with only Ann, Kayla, Chelsey and Chris photos standing out. Sara and Lexie landed in the bottom two for having the most unsatisfactory photos. Tyra cited Sara's inability to translate her beauty in photos (despite a drastic makeover) for her elimination.: Featured photographers: Keith Major (makeovers), Anne Menke (photoshoot); Special guests: Patricia Field, Matthew Preece, Edgardo Falcon Jr., Ryan Stybel, Michael Kanyon, Marco Berardini
177	4	"Matthew Rolston"	September 29, 2010	2.91
Kacey invited the male models from the previous photo shoot over for dinner. The next day, the contestants arrived at Knott's Berry Farm for their first reward challenge – they evoked an emotion while riding the park's, Silver Bullet roller coaster. Most of the girls struggled, most notably Chris, who was petrified by the ride. Liz was deemed the best and she won a feature on Tyra.com, photographed by Tyra herself. She chose Chris and Kayla to accompany her, and all three were surprised by a tea party with Tyra. Back at the house, the contestants ganged up on Kacey because of the latter's inability to clean up her own kitchen mess and pretentious demeanor. This week's photo shoot required the girls to portray underwater goddesses while modeling sea creatures, jewelry from Martin Katz, Neil Lane and Mikimoto. Jay was very impressed by Esther who brought emotion and her beauty to the shot, but very annoyed with Liz who kept complaining about her makeup sticking to her contact lenses. Rhianna was castigated because her "flower-child" posing style do not fit well with the concept of the shoot. At panel, Ann's photo blew away again the judges. Kendal, Esther, Kacey, Chris, and Kayla also shone in their pictures. Lexie was cautioned not to rely on having profile shots. Rhianna's lack of versatility and Liz's constant complaining landed them in the bottom two. In the end, Tyra handed the last photo to Liz, sending Rhianna home.: Featured photographer: Matthew Rolston; Special guests: Valente Frazier, Julie Matos, Troy Jensen, Michael Kanyon
178	5	"Karolina Kurkova"	October 6, 2010	2.85
Miss. J. led the contestants into 2nd Street Tunnel in Downtown Los Angeles where they were challenged to walk on a conveyor belt runway while wearing designs by Hervé Leger. While a majority of the contestants stumbled through the catwalk, Kacey was deemed the best, and was awarded Lisa Freede jewelry. Andre and supermodel Karolína Kurková dropped by the house, and Karolina taught the girls about personality and watchful eating. Back at the house, Kacey again clashed with Lexie and Liz. This week's photo shoot had the girls pose with Lucha libre wrestlers. At judging, Ann admitted that she struggled in her photo shoot, but the judges nevertheless loved her photograph, and she was called first for the fourth successive time. Jane landed in the bottom two for her apparent lack of presence, which the judges felt the kept her photos satisfactory, while Lexie was lambasted for her stifled posing, resulting in mediocre photos. Despite a vivacious personality, Lexie was sent home.: Featured photographers: Eddie Brakha, Moshe Brakha ("Brakha Squared"); Special guests: Karolína Kurková, Robert Steinken, Sunnie Brook Jones, Charlie Altuna, Jany Stanley
179	6	"Patrick Demarchelier"	October 13, 2010	2.95
The contestants were split into threes for a CoverGirl challenge at Walmart, where Esther, Kacey and Kayla had the overall best sales pitch; Kacey received the most votes from the public while Ann had the lowest. The trio won a shopping spree at Walmart's CoverGirl aisle, but Esther won an additional US$1,000 Walmart gift card for having the best makeup look. The contestants went to Rodeo Drive in Beverly Hills for this week's photo shoot with photographer Patrick Demarchelier. They were joined by male models as they strutted down Rodeo Drive while posing in clothing hand-picked for them by fashion stylist Lori Goldstein. The shoot was divided in three parts – a group shot with a man, a moving shot and solo beauty shot, leaving Chris to do solo. At panel, while Kendal and Jane received tremendous praise, but it was Ann, whose all three photos were again deemed the best, making a record of five consecutive first call-outs. Kayla's move in air photo (which she blamed on the discomfort caused by her undersized shoes) landed her in the bottom two, but it was Kacey, despite being deemed by the judges as having a great runway walk and spokesperson ability, who was eliminated for producing consistently lackluster photographs.: Featured photographer: Patrick Demarchelier; Special guests: Lori Goldstein, Derek Blasberg, Molly Stern
180	7	"Francesco Carrozzini"	October 20, 2010	3.00
The contestants arrived at the Grammy Museum, where they meet Neil Portnow, CEO of the National Academy of Recording Arts and Sciences. They split into four teams of two and were tasked to create a Grammy worthy look for their partner. Ann gave Chelsey a severely oversized dress, much to the latter's chagrin, while Kendal's dress for Chris was likened to that from a strip, and Kayla went against Liz' desire for a fancy gown and instead got her sequined pants. Nonetheless, Mr. Jay deemed Kayla and Liz the best and they won the challenge, but Neil ultimately picked Kayla to win the reward of being a presenter at the 53rd Annual Grammy Awards in February 2011. This week's photo shoot required the girls to portray notable celebrated fashion designers. At panel, Liz' portrayal was deemed the best, thus breaking Ann's five consecutive first call-outs. Kendal's shoot was deemed weak, while Esther failed to bring enough masculinity in her portrayal of a man, and they both landed in the bottom two. Although the judges felt that Kendal had a more unique look for the industry, they also felt that she needed more experience and development, thus sending her home.: Featured photographer: Francesco Carrozzini; Special guests: Neil Portnow, Rushka Bergman, Amy Orseman, Johnny Stuntz
181	8	"Zac Posen"	October 27, 2010	2.66
Miss. J made a surprise visit at the house, where he brought along famed fashion designer Zac Posen. Zac informed the contestants that they will be in his Fall 2010 Z-Spoke collection fashion show. The contestants ' professionalism were challenged when few of the working models they worked with constantly tried to break their confidence. After the show, it was revealed that the brutish demeanor that the other models had shown was an additional test. Chelsey was selected as the winner, and she won five looks from the collection. Instead of a photo shoot, the girls were filming their first commercial for a fictitious H2T energy drink while riding roller skates with Nigel as their director. Most of the contestants struggled. In particular, Ann fell numerous times while Kayla struggled feeling intimate around her male model due to a sexual assault that occurred during her childhood. Liz frustrated Nigel for failing to take the shoot seriously and laughing whenever she stumbled. At panel, Chris's confident performance won her a clear first call-out. All the other girls struggled to some degree, although Jane and Chelsey are told they improved as the shoot went on. Ann and Esther were deemed the worst, but Ann was saved on the sheer strength of her photos, eliminating Esther.: Featured commercial director: Nigel Barker; Special guests: Zac Posen, Johnny Stuntz, Joanna Konjevod, Amanda Fields
182	9	"Margherita Missoni"	November 3, 2010	2.96
Miss J. brought the contestants cycling to Venice, where they met Tyra sitting on a gondola. Tyra informed them that they would be traveling to the namesake city in Italy for the remainder of the competition. This week’s photo shoot took place in the Grand Canal, with the contestants posing in period couture gowns while lounging on a gondola by a group of three. Ann struggled to find her sexiness, while Chris and Liz struggled with numerous awkward actions and scenes. After the shoot was prematurely ended because of the rain, Jay announced that the contestants would be headed to Milan for the rest of the competition. The contestants were surprised about how their house was not as lavish as per previous seasons. Tyra arrived and explained that this was done intentionally to give the contestants a taste of how new models actually lived. The next day, the contestants visited the Missoni Fashion House in Milan and walked for CEO Angela Missoni as well as her daughter and heiress to the fashion line, Margherita, in their Fall collection. At judging, Chelsey and Liz nearly passed out due to the Italian summer heat, prompting Tyra to allow the contestants to sit down during the photo evaluations. Kayla received universal praise, Jane received praise for pushing through even with her hair in her face, while the rest all received mixed reviews. Chris landed in the bottom two because her vivacious personality did not match up to the photographs she took, but the judges once again cited Liz’s "excuses" and she was eliminated.: Featured photographer: Simone Falcetta; Special guests: Margherita Missoni, Angela Missoni, Lidia Permunian, Fabio D'Onofrio, Mario D'Amico, Alessandro Possati
183	10	"Kyle Hagler"	November 10, 2010	2.69
Before sending the contestants to the streets of Milan for go-sees, Tyra helped them organize their portfolios. Amongst their four appointments was Versace – and all the contestants naturally headed there first. After the four visited Versace, Chelsey decided to separate from the others, while Chris injured her ankle on the way back. Everybody only managed to visit one go-see, except for Chelsey for visited two. Jane, Chris and Chelsey all managed to get back in time. Ann managed to get back just a few minutes after the time ends, while Kayla really lost and ended up late several hours. Ann was the only one who booked Versace, but Chelsey won the challenge for visited two go-sees and came back in time. This week's photo shoot took place at Lake Como, where the girls were to portray statues that came to life. Ann, Chelsey and Kayla all performed well, while Chris’s ankle injury caused her some pain, and Jane struggled to be passionate with her male model, causing her to break down. IMG Models executive manager Kyle Hagler is this week's guest judge. While receiving critique, Jane again became emotional about her being unable to show her personality in front of them. Before deliberations, Tyra castigated all the contestants for doing poorly at their go-sees. Jane's consistent lack of presence and Chris's lack of high fashion ability landed them in the bottom two. However, Jane’s meltdown during the photo shoot and at panel made the judges see a crack of her personality, and Chris was sent home.: Featured photographer: Nigel Barker; Special guests: Kyle Hagler, Giovanni Di Corrinto, Andrea Cairo, Angelo Azzena, Danilo Di Pasquale, Vincenzo Cavicchi, Simone Bredariol
184	11	"Franca Sozzani"	November 17, 2010	2.49
The contestants met Miss J. and acting coach Barbara Terrinoni, who taught them about acting and emoting. Later, their personalities and confidence were put to the test when they met one-on-one with Vogue Italia's editor-in-chief, Franca Sozzani. Franca was impressed by Ann’s pictures, but ultimately chose Chelsey to win the prize of a private viewing of Leonardo da Vinci’s The Last Supper with André Leon Talley, as well as an overnight stay at a seven star Milan hotel called the Town House Galleria, which she shared with Kayla. The contestants arrived in Verona, where Jay informed them that two of them will be eliminated at the next panel. Tyra directed the contestants during a motion editorial challenge that requires them to bring their poses to life with movement and emotion. At panel, Franca sat as the guest judge. Jane received the highest praise by the judges, praised for embraced her wild and dark side through the motion editorial and seemed to has mastered her angles. Ann and Chelsey also received good reviews, Ann was praised for looked the sexiest she ever has on the show and Chelsey was recommended for her strong presence, but the judges criticized the former for her lack of charisma in front of the camera and the latter for consistently did the same expression every frames. Kayla, on the other hand, received the most critique of the week, severely criticized for hasn't mastered her angles yet even after so many weeks on the competition, her lack of presence, and the judges curious that she only can translate her beauty features on photos. After a very hard deliberation, Ann, for her super strong portfolio, ability to learn and great work on set, created an all-time high record after receiving her sixth collective first call-out of the cycle, leaving Chelsey, Jane and Kayla in the bottom three. Chelsey was noted for her passion in modeling, but her photos was never the best. Kayla was praised for her strong portfolio, but criticized for performing the worst and she hasn't mastered her angles yet weeks after weeks, and Jane was strongly warned by Tyra for her lack of presence in front of the judges, despite having improved greatly for the past weeks and has the best motion editorial work of the week. Tyra handed Chelsey the final photo, thus sending home both Jane and Kayla. After the credits, Tyra premiered her directorial debut of Modelli Folli (“Model Madness”).: Featured director: Tyra Banks; Special guests: Franca Sozzani, Barbara Terrinoni, Valentina Serra, Francesca Berardi
185	12	"High Fashion Highlights"	November 24, 2010	1.84
This is the recap episode of the cycle chronicling the first eleven episodes, and included some unbroadcast footage. Catfights between Kayla and Lexie; Chris and Kacey. Chelsey's 23rd birthday, Jane's makeover to a thug and her potential plan to Justin Bieber concert tickets, Chris' unseen departure from the competition and many more.
186	13	"Roberto Cavalli"	December 1, 2010	3.36
Ann and Chelsey were sent to do their Vogue Italia cover shots, where the photographer lauded them both. They arrived at Orta San Giulio and were sent to shoot their CoverGirl commercial, where instead of memorizing lines, they were instructed to do voice-overs. After the shoot, their families made a surprise appearance, where it was revealed that they would be sitting at the front row during their final fashion show. The next day, the final two met IMG Models executive Ivan Bart, where Ivan was pleased with Chelsey's personality and modeling experience, while Ann was advised to work on her personality, though her photos impressed. Ann and Chelsey were joined by cycle 14 winner Krista White and eliminated girls Chris, Kayla, Jane and Liz as they walked for Roberto Cavalli's Just Cavalli line. At panel, Jay Manuel and Roberto Cavalli sat as guest judges. Chelsey's walk was deemed focused but stiff, while Ann's was much improved but was chastised for her "scared" facial expressions. For their voice-overs, Chelsey's natural smile was universally praised but the judges thought she was an actress more than a model; Ann's voice was castigated but she looked stunning in the commercial. Chelsey's CoverGirl ad was unanimously deemed beautiful, although it may have been too pretty for a makeup ad, although her ease during the shoot itself was praised. Though Ann's photo was deemed beautiful, it was chastised for being too editorial, which made the judges worry if she could do commercial modelling. During deliberations, the judges were torn over the "breakout star" Ann and her rare high fashion look, and "professional model" Chelsey's all-American girl-next-door persona, as well as her immense knowledge of the fashion industry. Ann was named the winner of America's Next Top Model.: Featured photographers: Vincent Peters, Federico De Angelis; Special guests: Valentina Serra, Roberto Cavalli, Ivan Bart, Krista White

== Reception ==
Before the cycle aired, promotional footage showing the judges reacting to Ann Ward's waist drew criticism over the show's portrayal of thinness. Tyra Banks later said that she had not seen the clip before its release and apologized for the confusion, anger and disappointment it caused, stating that the program did not intend to promote an unhealthy body image.

== Summaries ==
=== Call-out order ===
Order	Episodes											
Order	1 (Note: The pool of 32 girls was reduced to 14. This call-out order does not reflect their performances that week.)	2	3 (Note: In episode 3, Terra was eliminated after the makeover shoot for having the worst reaction to her makeover and performing the worst at the shoot.)	4	5	6	7	8	9	10	11 (Note: In episode 11, Chelsey, Jane and Kayla were called forward as the bottom three. Tyra handed the last photo to Chelsey, eliminating the other two.)	13
1	Anamaria	Ann	Ann	Ann	Ann	Ann	Liz	Chris	Kayla	Kayla	Ann	Ann
2	Kendal	Kayla	Kayla	Kacey	Chris	Jane	Kayla	Jane	Jane	Chelsey	Chelsey	Chelsey
3	Rhianna	Chelsey	Chelsey	Esther	Chelsey	Kendal	Ann	Chelsey	Chelsey	Ann	Jane; Kayla	
4	Chris	Kendal	Chris	Chris	Kayla	Esther	Chelsey	Kayla	Ann	Jane	Jane; Kayla	
5	Jane	Lexie	Rhianna	Kendal	Liz	Chris	Chris	Liz	Chris	Chris		
6	Chelsey	Liz	Liz	Lexie	Esther	Chelsey	Jane	Ann	Liz			
7	Liz	Jane	Jane	Kayla	Kacey	Liz	Esther	Esther				
8	Sara	Esther	Kacey	Jane	Kendal	Kayla	Kendal					
9	Lexie	Chris	Kendal	Chelsey	Jane	Kacey						
10	Esther	Rhianna	Esther	Liz	Lexie							
11	Kacey	Kacey	Lexie	Rhianna								
12	Kayla	Sara	Sara									
13	Ann	Terra	Terra									
14	Terra	Anamaria										

The contestant was eliminated
The contestant was eliminated outside of the judging panel
The contestant won the competition

=== Bottom two ===
Episode	Contestants	Eliminated
2	Anamaria & Terra	Anamaria
3	Lexie & Sara	Sara
4	Liz & Rhianna	Rhianna
5	Jane & Lexie	Lexie
6	Kacey & Kayla	Kacey
7	Esther & Kendal	Kendal
8	Ann & Esther	Esther
9	Chris & Liz	Liz
10	Chris & Jane	Chris
11	Chelsey, Jane & Kayla	Jane
11	Chelsey, Jane & Kayla	Kayla
13	Ann & Chelsey	Chelsey

The contestant was eliminated after their first time in the bottom two
The contestant was eliminated after their second time in the bottom two
The contestant was eliminated after their third time in the bottom two
The contestant was eliminated in the final judging and placed as the runner-up

=== Average call-out order ===
Casting call-out order and final two are not included.

Rank by average	Place	Model	Call-out total	Number of call-outs	Call-out average
1	1	Ann	22	10	2.20
2	3–4	Kayla	34	10	3.40
3	2	Chelsey	38	10	3.80
4	5	Chris	40	9	4.44
5	3–4	Jane	50	10	5.00
6	6	Liz	46	8	5.75
7	8	Kendal	37	6	6.17
8	7	Esther	45	7	6.43
9	9	Kacey	37	5	7.40
10	10	Lexie	32	4	8.00
11	11	Rhianna	26	3	8.67
12	12	Sara	24	2	12.00
13	13	Terra	13	1	13.00
14	14	Anamaria	14	1	14.00

=== Photo shoots ===
- Episode 1 photo shoot: Paired up wearing Cynthia Rowley designs (casting)
- Episode 2 photo shoot: Teen bullying
- Episode 3 photo shoot: Fallen angels
- Episode 4 photo shoot: Underwater beauty shots
- Episode 5 photo shoot: Lucha Va Voom
- Episode 6 photo shoot: Walking down Rodeo Drive
- Episode 7 photo shoot: Portraying iconic fashion designers
- Episode 8 commercial: H2T water on roller skates
- Episode 9 photo shoot: Gondola group shoot with a casanova
- Episode 10 photo shoot: Marble statues coming to life
- Episode 11 motion editorial: Modelli folli ("Model Madness")
- Episode 13 photo shoot and commercial: CoverGirl Lash Blast Fusion print ad and commercial; beauty In Vogue spreads

=== Makeovers ===
- Terra – Cut short and dyed black
- Sara – Shoulder length cut and dyed chocolate brown with bleached eyebrows
- Rhianna – Long wavy brown extensions with blonde highlights
- Lexie – Dyed light brown
- Kacey – Long straight black weave and contacts instead of glasses
- Kendal – Long, straight middle-part black weave
- Esther – Dyed black
- Liz – Pixie cut
- Chris – Long wavy dark brown weave
- Kayla – Shoulder length bob with bangs and dyed bright red with bleached eyebrows
- Jane – Dyed light brown with blonde highlights
- Chelsey – Trimmed, dyed ice blonde and tooth gap accentuated
- Ann – Long wavy copper brown extensions

== Post-Top Model careers ==
- Anamaria Mirdita has taken test shots.
- Terra White has pursued modeling but has not been signed by an agency.
- Sara Blackamore did not state a desire to continue modeling after the show.
- Rhianna Atwood was signed by Paragon Model Management in Mexico City and appeared in Refix Magazine.
- Lexie Tomchek has done test shots but declared a hesitancy about continuing to model after the show, and declared a desire to pursue acting in Chicago.
- Kacey Leggett has continued to model, including at Miami Swim Week in 2018 and in an advertisement for Mia Beccar. She is represented by TNG Models in Las Vegas.
- Kendal Brown declared a desire to continue modeling in Atlanta after the show.
- Esther Petrack studied Hebrew at Hebrew University in Jerusalem after appearing on the show. She emigrated to Israel in 2012 and joined the IDF.
- Liz Williams declared a desire to continue modeling or be a television host after the show and pursued a degree in architecture. She has taken test shots.
- Chris White declared a desire to start acting again after the show.
- Jane Randall signed with IMG Models. She has appeared in Vogue Italia, the New York Times Magazine, and on the cover of Women's Wear Daily. She has models for Saks Fifth Avenue, Bloomingdale's, and other retailers online, and walked in runway shows at New York Fashion Week in 2011 and 2012. In 2017, she started to run "The Jersey Report," a New Jersey-focused right wing blog.
- Kayla Ferrel signed with a modeling agency in Japan and participated in season 17 of Top Model.
- Chelsey Hersley signed with Passport Model Management in San Francisco and Urban Talent Management in Boise after the competition, and later retired from modeling.
- Ann Ward won a contract with CoverGirl, a contract with IMG Models, and a spread in Vogue Italia. Since then, she has booked some ad campaigns with small designers, appeared in Velvet Magazine, and walked in some high fashion runway shows. She also posts artwork online.
