= 1990 in the United States =

- Decades: 1970s; 1980s; 1990s; 2000s; 2010s
- See also: History of the United States (1980–1991); Timeline of United States history (1990–2009); List of years in the United States

Events from the year 1990 in the United States.

== Incumbents ==
=== Federal government ===
- President: George H. W. Bush (R-Texas)
- Vice President: Dan Quayle (R-Indiana)
- Chief Justice: William Rehnquist (Virginia)
- Speaker of the House of Representatives: Tom Foley (D-Washington)
- Senate Majority Leader: George J. Mitchell (D-Maine)
- Congress: 101st

==== State governments ====
Governors and lieutenant governors

=== Governors ===
- Governor of Alabama: H. Guy Hunt (Republican)
- Governor of Alaska: Steve Cowper (Democratic) (until December 3), Wally Hickel (Alaskan Independence)/(Republican) (starting December 3)
- Governor of Arizona: Rose Mofford (Democratic)
- Governor of Arkansas: Bill Clinton (Democratic)
- Governor of California: George Deukmejian (Republican)
- Governor of Colorado: Roy Romer (Democratic)
- Governor of Connecticut: William A O'Neill (Democratic)
- Governor of Delaware: Michael Castle (Republican)
- Governor of Florida: Bob Martinez (Republican)
- Governor of Georgia: Joe Frank Harris (Democratic)
- Governor of Hawaii: John D. Waihee III (Democratic)
- Governor of Idaho: Cecil D. Andrus (Democratic)
- Governor of Illinois: James R. Thompson (Republican)
- Governor of Indiana: Evan Bayh (Democratic)
- Governor of Iowa: Terry E. Branstad (Republican)
- Governor of Kansas: Mike Hayden (Republican)
- Governor of Kentucky: Wallace G. Wilkinson (Democratic)
- Governor of Louisiana: Buddy Roemer (Democratic)/(Republican)
- Governor of Maine: John R. McKernan, Jr. (Republican)
- Governor of Maryland: William Donald Schaefer (Democratic)
- Governor of Massachusetts: Michael Dukakis (Democratic)
- Governor of Michigan: James Blanchard (Democratic)
- Governor of Minnesota: Rudy Perpich (Democratic)
- Governor of Mississippi: Ray Mabus (Democratic)
- Governor of Missouri: John Ashcroft (Republican)
- Governor of Montana: Stan Stephens (Republican)
- Governor of Nebraska: Kay A. Orr (Republican)
- Governor of Nevada: Bob Miller (Democratic)
- Governor of New Hampshire: Judd Gregg (Republican)
- Governor of New Jersey: Thomas Kean (Republican) (until January 16), James Florio (Democratic) (starting January 16)
- Governor of New Mexico: Garrey Carruthers (Republican)
- Governor of New York: Mario Cuomo (Democratic)
- Governor of North Carolina: James G. Martin (Republican)
- Governor of North Dakota: George A. Sinner (Democratic)
- Governor of Ohio: Dick Celeste (Democratic)
- Governor of Oklahoma: Henry Bellmon (Republican)
- Governor of Oregon: Neil Goldschmidt (Democratic)
- Governor of Pennsylvania: Robert P. Casey (Democratic)
- Governor of Rhode Island: Edward D. DiPrete (Republican)
- Governor of South Carolina: Carroll A. Campbell, Jr. (Republican)
- Governor of South Dakota: George S. Mickelson (Republican)
- Governor of Tennessee: Ned McWherter (Democratic)
- Governor of Texas: Bill Clements (Republican)
- Governor of Utah: Norman H. Bangerter (Republican)
- Governor of Vermont: Madeleine M. Kunin (Democratic)
- Governor of Virginia: Gerald L. Baliles (Democratic) (until January 13), Douglas Wilder (Democratic) (starting January 13)
- Governor of Washington: Booth Gardner (Democratic)
- Governor of West Virginia: Gaston Caperton (Democratic)
- Governor of Wisconsin: Tommy Thompson (Republican)
- Governor of Wyoming: Mike Sullivan (Democratic)

=== Lieutenant governors ===
- Lieutenant Governor of Alabama: Jim Folsom, Jr. (Democratic)
- Lieutenant Governor of Alaska: Stephen McAlpine (Democratic) (until December 3), Jack Coghill (Alaskan Independence) (starting December 3)
- Lieutenant Governor of Arkansas: Winston Bryant (Democratic)
- Lieutenant Governor of California: Leo T. McCarthy (Democratic)
- Lieutenant Governor of Colorado: Mike Callihan (Democratic)
- Lieutenant Governor of Connecticut: Joseph J. Fauliso (Democratic)
- Lieutenant Governor of Delaware: Dale E. Wolf (Republican)
- Lieutenant Governor of Florida: Bobby Brantley (Republican)
- Lieutenant Governor of Georgia: Zell Miller (Democratic)
- Lieutenant Governor of Hawaii: Ben Cayetano (Democratic)
- Lieutenant Governor of Idaho: Butch Otter (Republican)
- Lieutenant Governor of Illinois: George H. Ryan (Republican)
- Lieutenant Governor of Indiana: Frank O'Bannon (Democratic)
- Lieutenant Governor of Iowa: Jo Ann Zimmerman (Democratic)
- Lieutenant Governor of Kansas: Jack D. Walker (Republican)
- Lieutenant Governor of Kentucky: Brereton Jones (Democratic)
- Lieutenant Governor of Louisiana: Paul Hardy (Republican)
- Lieutenant Governor of Maryland: Melvin A. Steinberg (Democratic)
- Lieutenant Governor of Massachusetts: Evelyn Murphy (Democratic)
- Lieutenant Governor of Michigan: Martha W. Griffiths (Democratic)
- Lieutenant Governor of Minnesota: Marlene Johnson (Democratic)
- Lieutenant Governor of Mississippi: Brad Dye (Democratic)
- Lieutenant Governor of Missouri: Mel Carnahan (Democratic)
- Lieutenant Governor of Montana: Allen Kolstad (Republican)
- Lieutenant Governor of Nebraska: William E. Nichol (Republican)
- Lieutenant Governor of Nevada: vacant
- Lieutenant Governor of New Mexico: Jack L. Stahl (Republican)
- Lieutenant Governor of New York: Stan Lundine (Democratic)
- Lieutenant Governor of North Carolina: James Carson Gardner (Republican)
- Lieutenant Governor of North Dakota: Lloyd Omdahl (Democratic)
- Lieutenant Governor of Ohio: Paul R. Leonard (Democratic)
- Lieutenant Governor of Oklahoma: Robert S. Kerr III (Democratic)
- Lieutenant Governor of Pennsylvania: Mark Singel (Democratic)
- Lieutenant Governor of Rhode Island: Roger N. Begin (Democratic)
- Lieutenant Governor of South Carolina: Nick Theodore (Democratic)
- Lieutenant Governor of South Dakota: Walter Dale Miller (Republican)
- Lieutenant Governor of Tennessee: John S. Wilder (Democratic)
- Lieutenant Governor of Texas: William P. Hobby, Jr. (Democratic)
- Lieutenant Governor of Utah: W. Val Oveson (Republican)
- Lieutenant Governor of Vermont: Howard Dean (Democratic)
- Lieutenant Governor of Virginia: Douglas Wilder (Democratic) (until January 13), Don Beyer (Democratic) (starting January 13)
- Lieutenant Governor of Washington: Joel Pritchard (Republican)
- Lieutenant Governor of Wisconsin: Scott McCallum (Republican)

== Events ==
=== January ===
- January 2 – The Dow Jones Industrial Average closes above 2,800 for the first time ever.
- January 3 – United States invasion of Panama: General Manuel Noriega, the deposed "strongman of Panama", surrenders to American forces.
- January 5 – The National Gallery of Art purchases The Fall of Phaeton by Peter Paul Rubens.
- January 9–20 – The Space Shuttle Columbia flies STS-32.
- January 10 – Time Warner is formed from the merger of Time Inc. and Warner Communications Inc.
- January 13 – Douglas Wilder becomes the first elected African American governor as he takes office in Richmond, Virginia.
- January 15 – Martin Luther King Day Crash – Telephone service in Atlanta, St. Louis, and Detroit, including 9-1-1 service, goes down for nine hours, due to an AT&T software bug.
- January 17 – Smith & Wesson introduce the .40 S&W cartridge.
- January 18
  - In Washington, D.C., Mayor Marion Barry is arrested for drug possession in an FBI sting.
  - In California, the McMartin preschool trial, the longest criminal trial in U.S. history, ends with all defendants being acquitted on charges of child molesting.
- January 22 – Robert Tappan Morris, Jr. is convicted of releasing the Morris worm.
- January 24
  - Richard Secord is sentenced to two years probation for lying to the United States Congress about the Iran–Contra affair.
  - In Miami, William Lozano, a Hispanic police officer, is sentenced to seven years in prison for shooting a black motorcyclist in 1989, an event that had set off three days of rioting.
- January 25 – Avianca Flight 52 crashes into Cove Neck, Long Island, New York, killing 73, after a miscommunication between the flight crew and JFK Airport officials.
- January 28 – The San Francisco 49ers defeat the Denver Broncos in Super Bowl XXIV.
- January 29
  - The trial of Joseph Hazelwood, former skipper of the Exxon Valdez, begins in Anchorage, Alaska. He is accused of negligence that resulted in America's worst oil spill to date.
  - In Holmdel, New Jersey, scientists at Bell Labs announce they have created a digital optical processor that could lead to the development of superfast computers that use pulses of light rather than electric currents to make calculations.
- January 31
  - President of the United States George H. W. Bush gives his first State of the Union address and proposes that the U.S. and the Soviet Union make deep cuts to their military forces in Europe.
  - Cold War: The first McDonald's in Moscow, Russia opens.

=== February ===
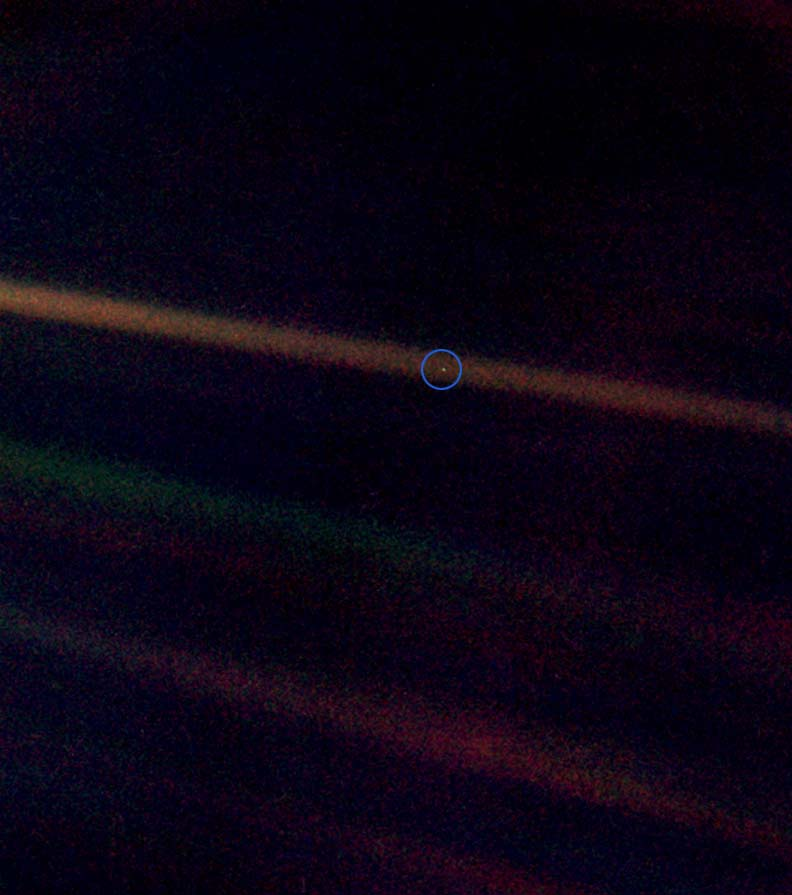
February 14: Pale Blue Dot

- February 10 – Two unidentified men enter a bowling alley in Las Cruces, New Mexico, with the intent of robbing it. They ultimately shoot 7 civilians, killing 5, and set fire to the establishment. The incident remains unsolved.
- February 11 – James "Buster" Douglas knocks out Mike Tyson to win the World Heavyweight Boxing crown.
- February 13 – Drexel Burnham Lambert files for Chapter 11 bankruptcy protection.
- February 14 – The Pale Blue Dot picture is sent back from the Voyager 1 probe after completing its primary mission; it was about 6 billion km (3.7 billion miles) from Earth.
- February 15 – The owners of Major League Baseball announce a lockout because of a salary dispute with players.
- February 19 – The United Mine Workers reach a deal with the Pittston Company to end the Pittston Coal strike that had gone on since April 5, 1989; most striking coal miners return to work on February 26.
- February 25 – A smoking ban takes effect on all domestic U.S. flights of less than six hours.
- February 27 – Exxon Valdez oil spill: Exxon and its shipping company are indicted on five criminal counts.
- February 28
  - The Space Shuttle Atlantis begins STS-36.
  - The 5.7 M_{w} Upland earthquake hits the Greater Los Angeles Area with a maximum Mercalli intensity of VII (Very strong), causing $12.7 million in losses and 30 injuries.

=== March ===
- March – Greyhound bus drivers strike for higher pay.
- March 1
  - Steve Jackson Games is raided by the U.S. Secret Service, prompting the later formation of the Electronic Frontier Foundation.
  - The Nuclear Regulatory Commission approves a license for the long-delayed Seabrook Station Nuclear Power Plant.
- March 6 – An SR-71 sets a U.S. transcontinental speed record of 1 hour 8 minutes 17 seconds, on what is publicized as its last official flight.
- March 9 – Antonia Novello is sworn in as Surgeon General of the United States, becoming the first female and Hispanic American to serve in the position.
- March 18
  - Twelve paintings, collectively worth from $100 to $300 million, are stolen from the Isabella Stewart Gardner Museum in Boston, Massachusetts by two robbers posing as police officers. It is the largest art theft, and the largest theft of private property, ever; the paintings have not been recovered and the crime remains unsolved.
  - Major League Baseball players and owners agree to a new four-year contract, ending the lockout begun on February 15.
- March 22 – A jury in Anchorage, Alaska finds Joseph Hazelwood guilty of misdemeanor negligence for his role in the Exxon Valdez oil spill. He is sentenced to pay $50,000 in restitution and to spend 1,000 hours cleaning oily beaches.
- March 25 – In New York City, a fire due to arson at an illegal social club called "Happy Land" kills 87.
- March 26 – The 62nd Academy Awards, hosted by Billy Crystal, are held at Dorothy Chandler Pavilion in Los Angeles, with Bruce Beresford's Driving Miss Daisy winning four awards out of nine nominations, including Best Picture. Jessica Tandy, at 80, becomes the oldest actress to win Best Actress and the oldest person to win for acting until 2012. Oliver Stone wins his second Best Director award for Born on the Fourth of July. The telecast garners over 40 million viewers.
- March 27 – The United States begins broadcasting TV Martí to Cuba.
- March 28 – U.S. President George H. W. Bush posthumously awards Jesse Owens the Congressional Gold Medal.

=== April ===
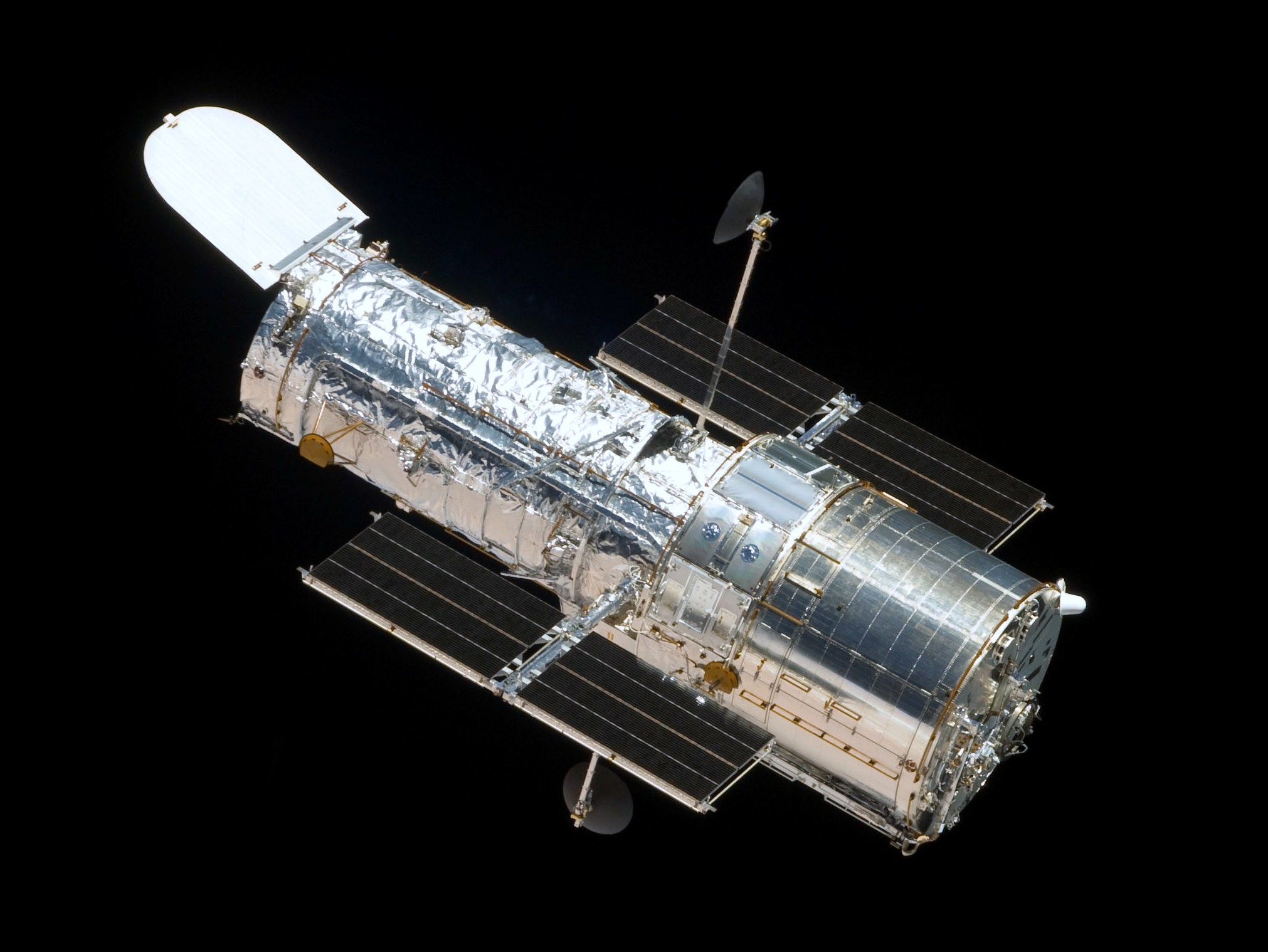
April 24: Hubble Space Telescope in orbit

- April 2 – The UNLV Runnin' Rebels basketball team defeats the Duke Blue Devils men's basketball team to win the 1990 NCAA Men's Division I Basketball Tournament.
- April 6 – Robert Mapplethorpe's "The Perfect Moment" show of nude and homosexual photographs opens at the Cincinnati Contemporary Art Center, in spite of accusations of indecency by Citizens for Community Values.
- April 7 – Iran-Contra Affair: John Poindexter is found guilty of five charges for his part in the scandal; the convictions are later reversed on appeal.
- April 8 – Ryan White, who made headlines after being expelled for contracting AIDS, dies from the disease at the age of 18.
- April 9 – Sigma Lambda Gamma National Sorority, Inc. is established.
- April 17–18 – President Bush meets with representatives of 17 countries and two international organizations at the White House to discuss global warming and other environmental issues.
- April 20 – STS-31: The Hubble Space Telescope is launched aboard Space Shuttle Discovery.
- April 23 – Lebanon hostage crisis: Lebanese kidnappers release American educator Robert Polhill, who had been held hostage since January 1987.
- April 24 – Investor Michael Milken pleads guilty to six felonies and agrees to pay $600 million in fines and restitution.
- April 25 – The Space Shuttle Discovery places the Hubble Space Telescope into orbit.
- April 28 – A Chorus Line, the longest-running musical in Broadway history, closes after 6,137 performances.
- April 30 – Lebanon hostage crisis: Lebanese kidnappers release American educator Frank H. Reed, who had been held hostage since September 1986.

=== May ===
- May 13 – In the Philippines, gunmen kill two United States Air Force airmen near Clark Air Base on the eve of talks between the Philippines and the United States over the future of American military bases in the Philippines.
- May 16 – The Muppets creator Jim Henson dies at the age of 53 from Toxic shock syndrome.
- May 19 – The U.S. and the Soviet Union agree to end production of chemical weapons and to destroy most of their stockpiles of chemical weapons.
- May 22 – Microsoft releases Windows 3.0.
- May 24 – The Edmonton Oilers defeat the Boston Bruins in the 1990 Stanley Cup Finals for their fifth Stanley Cup.
- May 30 – President Bush and Mikhail Gorbachev begin a four-day summit meeting in Washington, D.C.

=== June ===
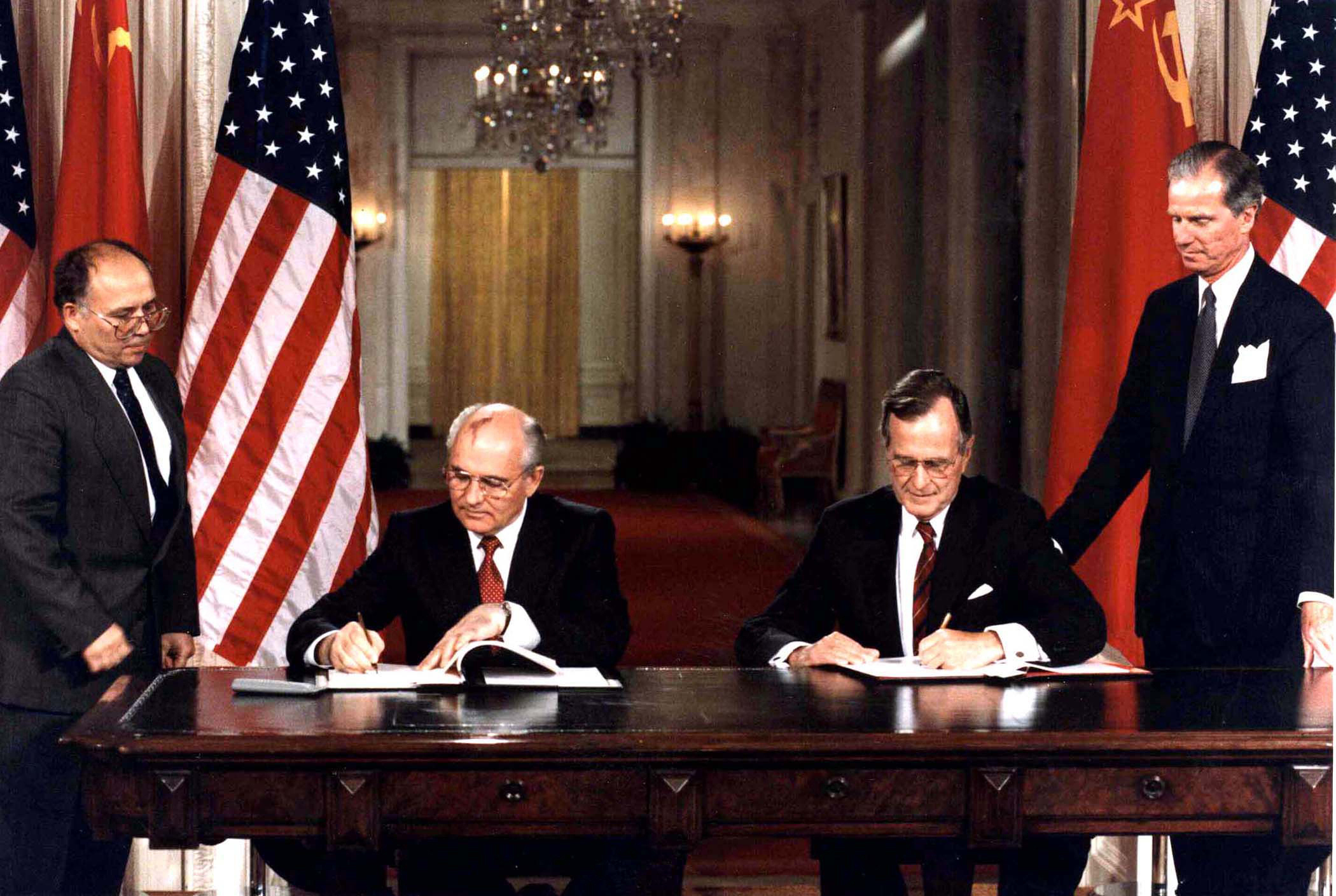
June 1: 1990 Chemical Weapons Accord

- June – The last month of the 1980s business cycle expansion, at the time the second-longest expansion in American history (the 1960s expansion was a year longer), comes to an end; the unemployment rate is 5.2%.
- June 1
  - Cold War: U.S. President George H. W. Bush and Soviet Union leader Mikhail Gorbachev sign the Chemical Weapons Accord to end chemical weapon production and begin destroying their respective stocks.
  - The Dow Jones Industrial Average closes above 2,900 for the first time ever.
- June 2 – The Lower Ohio Valley tornado outbreak spawns 88 confirmed tornadoes in Illinois, Indiana, Kentucky, and Ohio, killing 12; Thirty-seven tornadoes occur in Indiana, eclipsing the previous record of 21 during the 1974 Super Outbreak.
- June 7
  - Nickelodeon Studios opens.
  - Universal Studios Florida opens to the public.
- June 9 – Mega Borg oil spill in the Gulf of Mexico near Galveston, Texas.
- June 11
  - Nolan Ryan pitches his sixth career no-hitter.
  - In United States v. Eichman, the Supreme Court overturns a 1989 federal law that made it illegal to burn the United States flag.
- June 14 – 1990 NBA Finals: The Detroit Pistons defeat the Portland Trail Blazers.
- June 17–30 – Nelson Mandela tours North America, visiting three Canadian cities and eight U.S. cities.
- June 18 – James Edward Pough kills 10 and injures six before committing suicide at a General Motors car loan office in Jacksonville, Florida.
- June 22 – The United States Fish and Wildlife Service declares the spotted owl a threatened species.
- June 25 – In Cruzan v. Director, Missouri Department of Health, the Supreme Court allows public officials to intervene in questions of termination of life support in the absence of an advance healthcare directive.
- June 26 – President George H. W. Bush reneges on his 1988 "no new taxes" campaign pledge in a statement accepting tax revenue increases as a necessity to reduce the budget deficit. This later becomes a factor in the 1992 presidential election.
- June 28 – The Dart Man attacks begin in New York City.

=== July ===
- July – The United States enters the early 1990s recession.
- July 2 – A U.S. District Court acquits Imelda Marcos on racketeering and fraud charges.
- July 9–11 – The 16th G7 Summit is held in Houston.
- July 19 – Pete Rose is sentenced to five months in prison after pleading guilty to filing false tax returns.
- July 20
  - A federal appeals court overturns three convictions of Oliver North.
  - William J. Brennan, Jr. resigns from the Supreme Court for health reasons.
- July 25 – The United States Senate votes to reprimand Senator David Durenberger for improper financial dealings and orders him to pay restitution.
- July 26
  - U.S. President George H. W. Bush signs the Americans with Disabilities Act, designed to protect disabled Americans from discrimination.
  - The United States House of Representatives votes to reprimand Rep. Barney Frank for conduct stemming from his relationship with a male prostitute.
- July 28 – A fire at a generating plant knocks out power to 40,000 homes in Chicago's west side. Power is restored by July 31.

=== August ===
- August 2
  - Gulf War: Iraq invades Kuwait, eventually leading to the Gulf War.
  - Federal prosecutors indict Rep. Floyd H. Flake and his wife on 17 counts of conspiracy, fraud and tax evasion.
- August 6 – Gulf War: The United Nations Security Council orders a global trade embargo against Iraq in response to its invasion of Kuwait.
- August 9 – Yosemite National Park closes temporarily because of forest fires.
- August 10 – The Magellan enters orbit around Venus.
- August 12 – "Sue", the best preserved Tyrannosaurus rex specimen ever found, is discovered near Faith, South Dakota by Sue Hendrickson.
- August 18 – In New York City, a jury finds three teenagers guilty of raping and assaulting a woman in Central Park in April 1989. On September 11, they are sentenced to 5–10 years in prison.
- August 19 – Leonard Bernstein conducts his final concert, ending with Ludwig van Beethoven's Symphony No. 7 performed by the Boston Symphony Orchestra.
- August 26–28 – In Gainesville, Florida, police find five murdered college students, apparently killed by a serial killer.
- August 27 – The World Wrestling Federation holds its SummerSlam event from the Spectrum in Philadelphia, Pennsylvania.
- August 28 – The Plainfield Tornado (F5 on the Fujita scale) strikes the towns of Plainfield, Crest Hill, and Joliet, Illinois, killing 29 people (the strongest tornado to date to strike the Chicago Metropolitan Area).

=== September ===
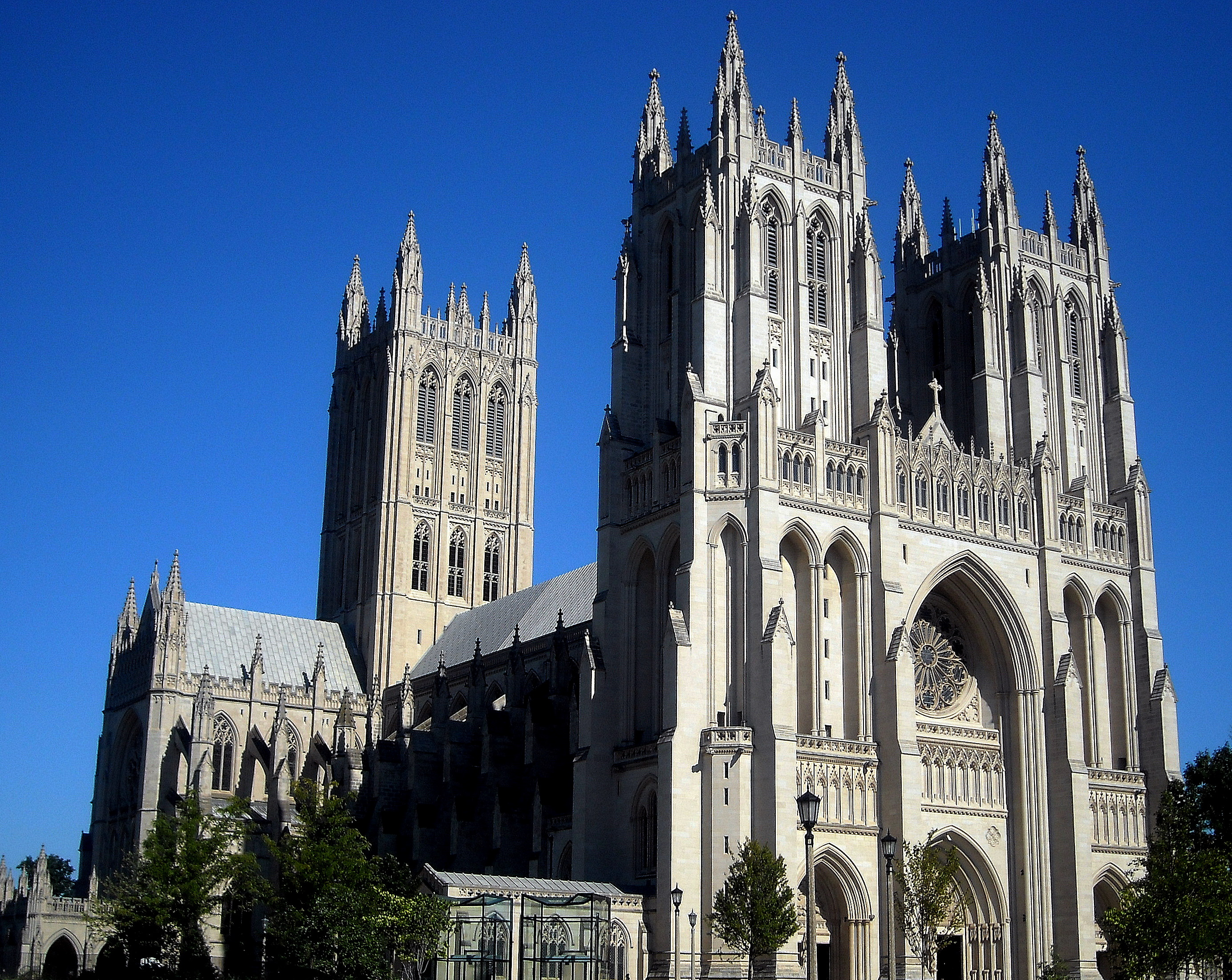
September 28: Washington National Cathedral completed

- September 8 – Fox Kids, a children's programming block, debuts on Fox.
- September 9
  - President Bush and Soviet President Gorbachev meet in Helsinki to discuss the Persian Gulf crisis.
  - After six years of renovations, Ellis Island reopens as an immigration museum.
  - Pete Sampras, age 19, wins the 1990 US Open, becoming the youngest person to ever win the event.
- September 10 – The comedy television sitcom series The Fresh Prince of Bel-Air premieres on NBC.
- September 11 – Gulf War: President George H. W. Bush delivers a nationally televised speech in which he threatens the use of force to remove Iraqi soldiers from Kuwait.
- September 12 – Cold War: The two German states and the Four Powers sign the Treaty on the Final Settlement With Respect to Germany in Moscow, paving the way for German reunification.
- September 14 – Scientists at the National Institutes of Health in Bethesda, Maryland begin the first gene therapy on a human patient.
- September 17
  - United States Secretary of Defense Dick Cheney fires Gen. Michael Dugan, Chief of Staff of the United States Air Force, for publicly discussing plans to bomb Iraq.
  - In what will come to be regarded as a landmark event in regards to women in journalism, reporter Lisa Olson is sexually harassed by multiple New England Patriots players while trying to conduct a locker room interview.
- September 18
  - The International Olympic Committee awards the 1996 Summer Olympics to Atlanta, Georgia.
  - Charles Keating is indicted on charges in connection with the 1989 failure of the Lincoln Savings and Loan Association.
- September 24 – President Bush meets with President of South Africa F. W. de Klerk at the White House, the first time a South African head of government had visited the U.S. since 1945.
- September 26 – The Motion Picture Association of America replaces its X rating with a new NC-17 rating.
- September 29 – Washington National Cathedral is completed after 83 years of construction.
- September 30 – The New Revised Standard Version of the Bible is published in the United States.

=== October ===
- October 2 – The Senate confirms David Souter to the Supreme Court; he takes his seat on October 9.
- October 3 – In Fort Lauderdale, Florida, a jury convicts a record store owner of obscenity for selling an album by 2 Live Crew. On October 20, a second jury finds 2 Live Crew not guilty of obscenity on charges stemming from a June 1990 performance.
- October 5 – In Cincinnati, a jury finds an art museum and its art director innocent of breaking obscenity laws for displaying sexually explicit photographs by Robert Mapplethorpe.
- October 6 – STS-41: The Space Shuttle Discovery lifts off and launches the Ulysses on a mission to study the sun.
- October 6–8 – The federal government temporarily halts all non-essential services after Congress fails to enact a new budget and President Bush vetoes a stop-gap spending measure.
- October 9 – Leonard Bernstein announces his retirement from conducting after 47 years. He dies five days later.
- October 20 – The Cincinnati Reds defeat the Oakland Athletics, 4 games to 0, to win their 5th World Series Title.
- October 22
  - President Bush vetoes a civil rights bill that would have strengthened federal protection against job discrimination, arguing that it would lead to race and gender-based quotas.
  - In Orange County, California, a judge denies a surrogate mother's request for parental rights to a child she bore for another couple.
- October 24 – United States Secretary of Labor Elizabeth Dole announces her resignation.
- October 25 – Evander Holyfield defeats James "Buster" Douglas to become the heavyweight boxing champion.
- October 27 – Congress passes the Clean Air Act of 1990.

=== November ===
- November – Rhode Island banking crisis begins.
- November 5
  - President George H. W. Bush signs the Omnibus Budget Reconciliation Act of 1990, which includes tax increases despite his "no new taxes" pledge.
  - Rabbi Meir Kahane, founder of the far-right Kach movement, is shot dead after a speech at a New York City hotel.
- November 6
  - In the congressional elections, Democrats increase their majorities in both houses of Congress.
  - Sharon Pratt Kelly is elected Mayor of the District of Columbia, becoming the first black woman to head a major U.S. city. She takes office January 2, 1991.
- November 8 – William Bennett resigns as Director of the Office of National Drug Control Policy.
- November 11 – Stormie Jones, the Texas girl who had been the world's first recipient of a simultaneous heart and liver transplant in 1984, dies at a Pittsburgh hospital at age 13.
- November 15 – STS-38: Space Shuttle Atlantis is launched on a classified military mission.
- November 16
  - President Bush leaves on a trip to Europe and the Middle East; he spends Thanksgiving with U.S. troops in Saudi Arabia.
  - Walt Disney Feature Animation's 29th feature film, The Rescuers Down Under, is released. A sequel to 1977's The Rescuers and the first theatrically released Disney sequel, it received positive reviews but struggled at the box office as it opened the same day as Home Alone.
- November 21 – Financier Michael Milken is sentenced to 10 years in prison.
- November 27 – The National Football League fines the New England Patriots and three of its players for the sexual harassment of reporter Lisa Olson.
- November 29 – Gulf War: The United Nations Security Council passes UN Security Council Resolution 678, authorizing military intervention in Iraq if that nation does not withdraw its forces from Kuwait and free all foreign hostages by January 15, 1991.

=== December ===
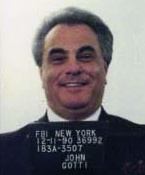
December 11: John Gotti arrested

- December – The unemployment rate rises to 6.3%, the highest since May 1987.
- December 1 – Quarterback Ty Detmer of the BYU Cougars football wins the Heisman Trophy.
- December 2 – STS-35: Space Shuttle Columbia begins a mission that ends on December 10, a day earlier than planned, ending a mission plagued with computer and plumbing problems.
- December 2–8 – President Bush visits Brazil, Uruguay, Argentine, Chile, and Venezuela.
- December 3 – At Detroit Metropolitan Airport, Northwest Airlines Flight 1482 (a McDonnell Douglas DC-9) collides with Northwest Airlines Flight 299 (a Boeing 727) on the runway, killing eight passengers and four crew members on Flight 1482.
- December 11
  - A dense fog overwhelms an interstate near Calhoun, Tennessee, damaging ninety-nine vehicles, injuring forty-two people, and killing a dozen, making it one of the worst automobile accidents in American history.
  - American mob boss John Gotti is arrested.
- December 14 – President Bush names Lynn Morley Martin to replace Elizabeth Dole as Secretary of Labor.
- December 17 – President Bush names Lamar Alexander as United States Secretary of Education, replacing Lauro Cavazos, who resigned on December 12.
- December 25 – The Godfather Part III opens in theaters.

=== Ongoing ===
- Cold War (1947–1991)
- Gulf War (1990–1991)

== Births ==
=== January ===
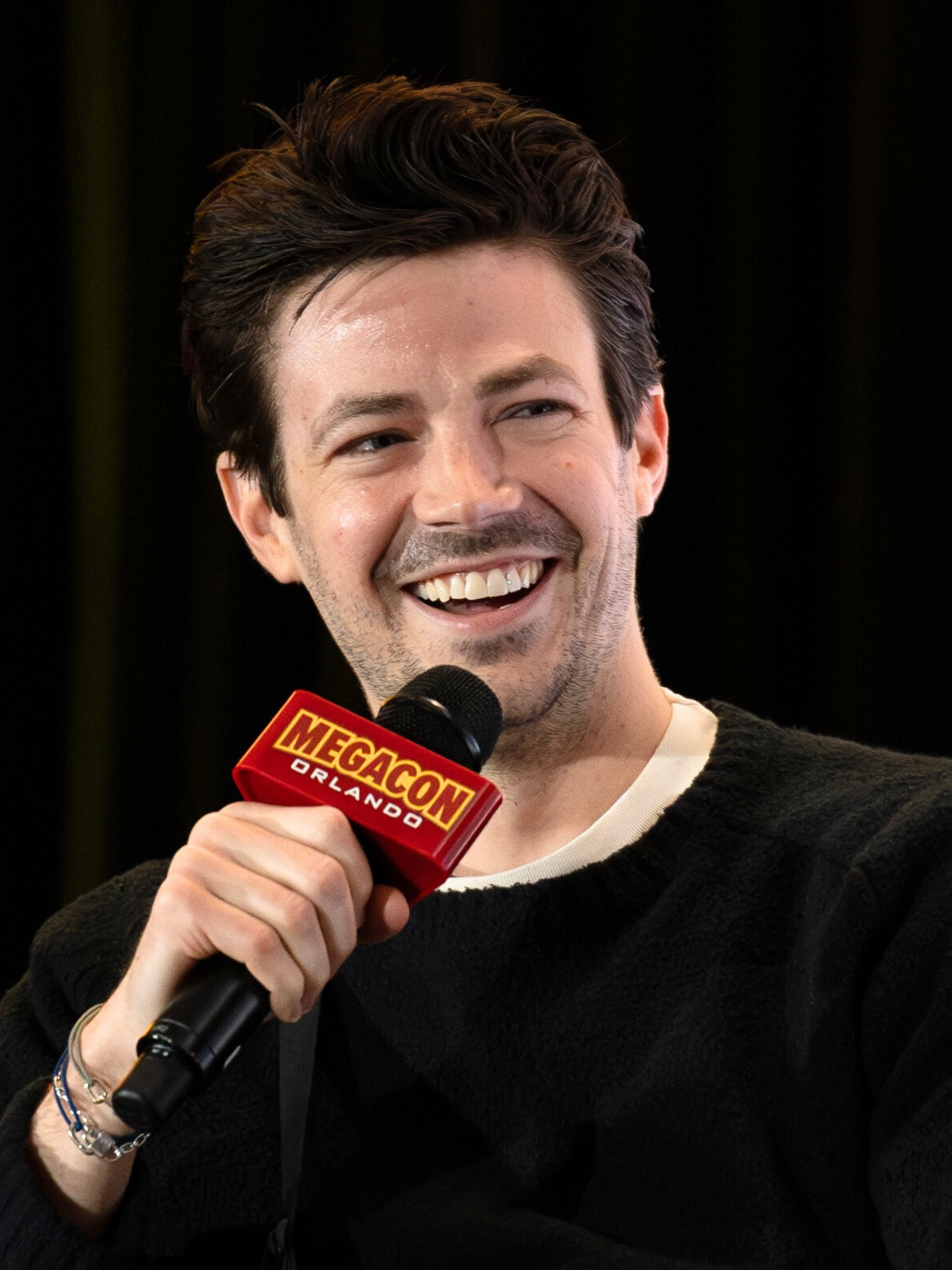
Grant Gustin

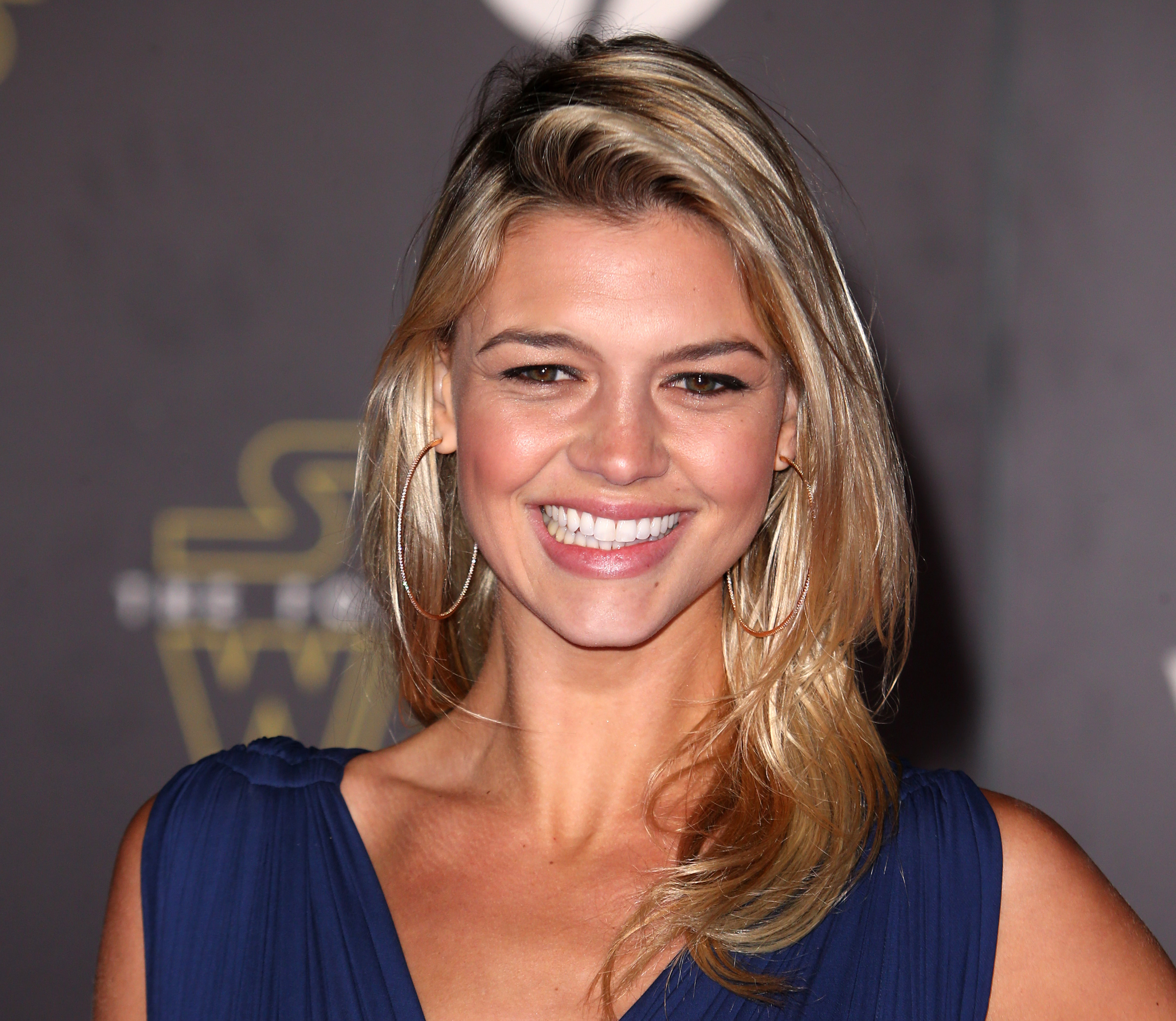
Kelly Rohrbach

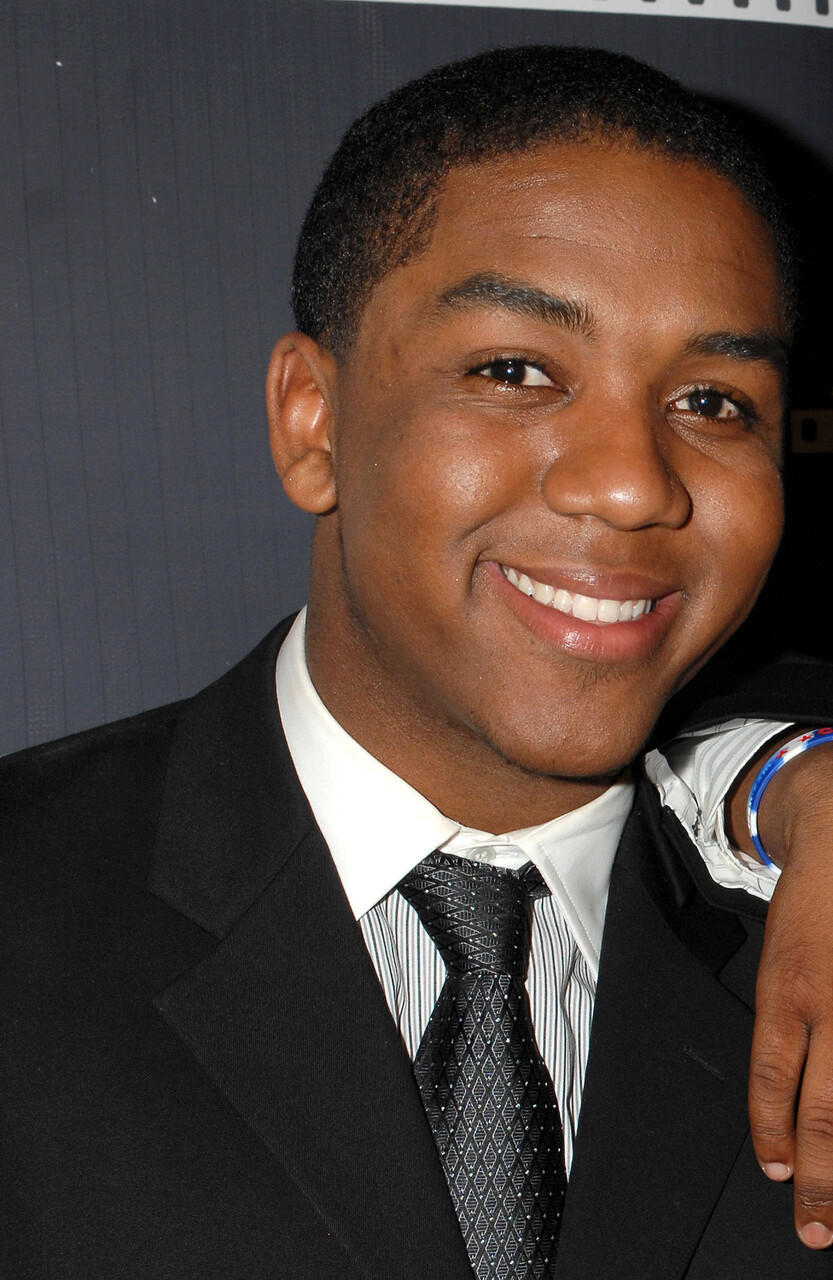
Christopher Massey

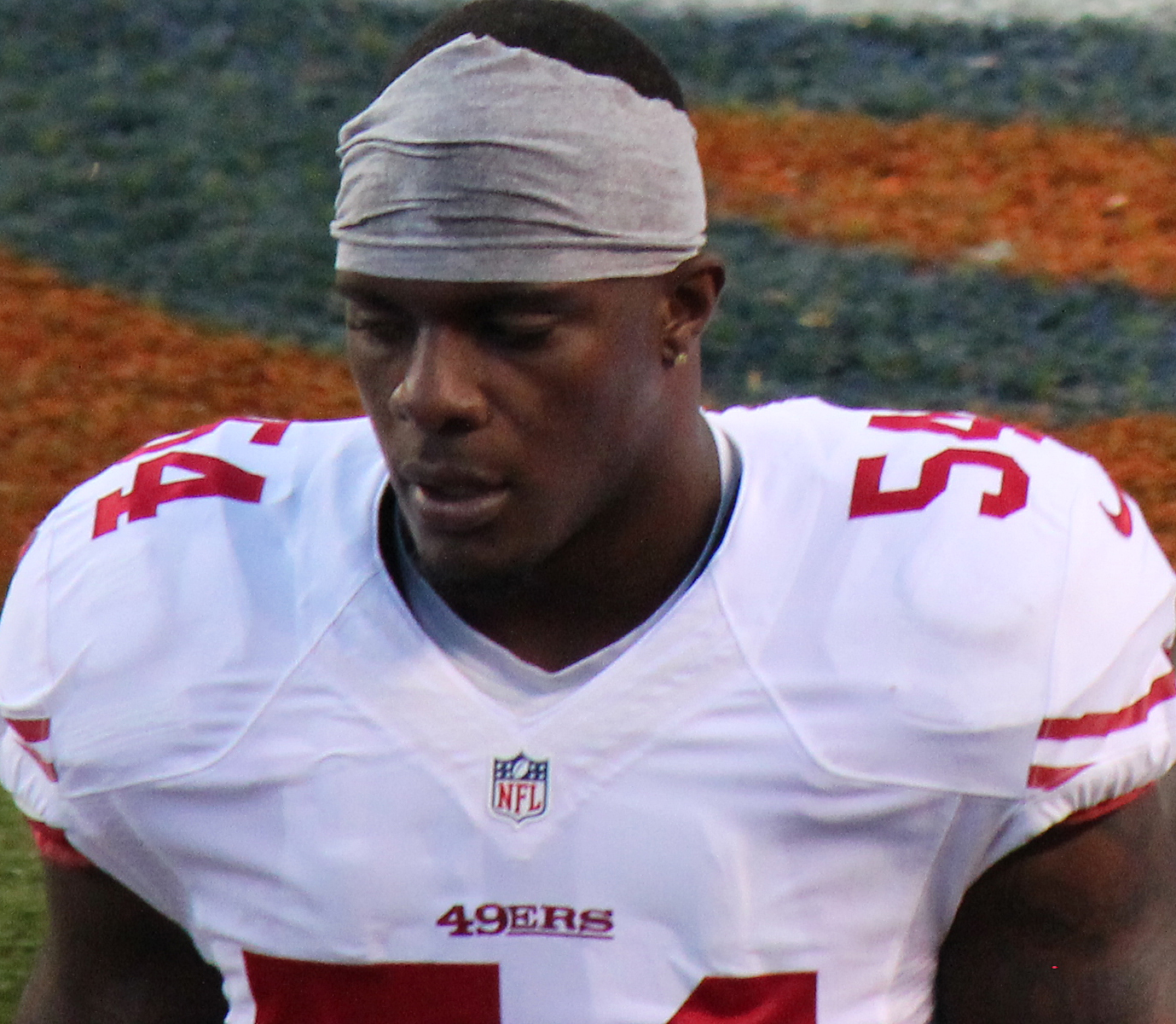
Nick Moody

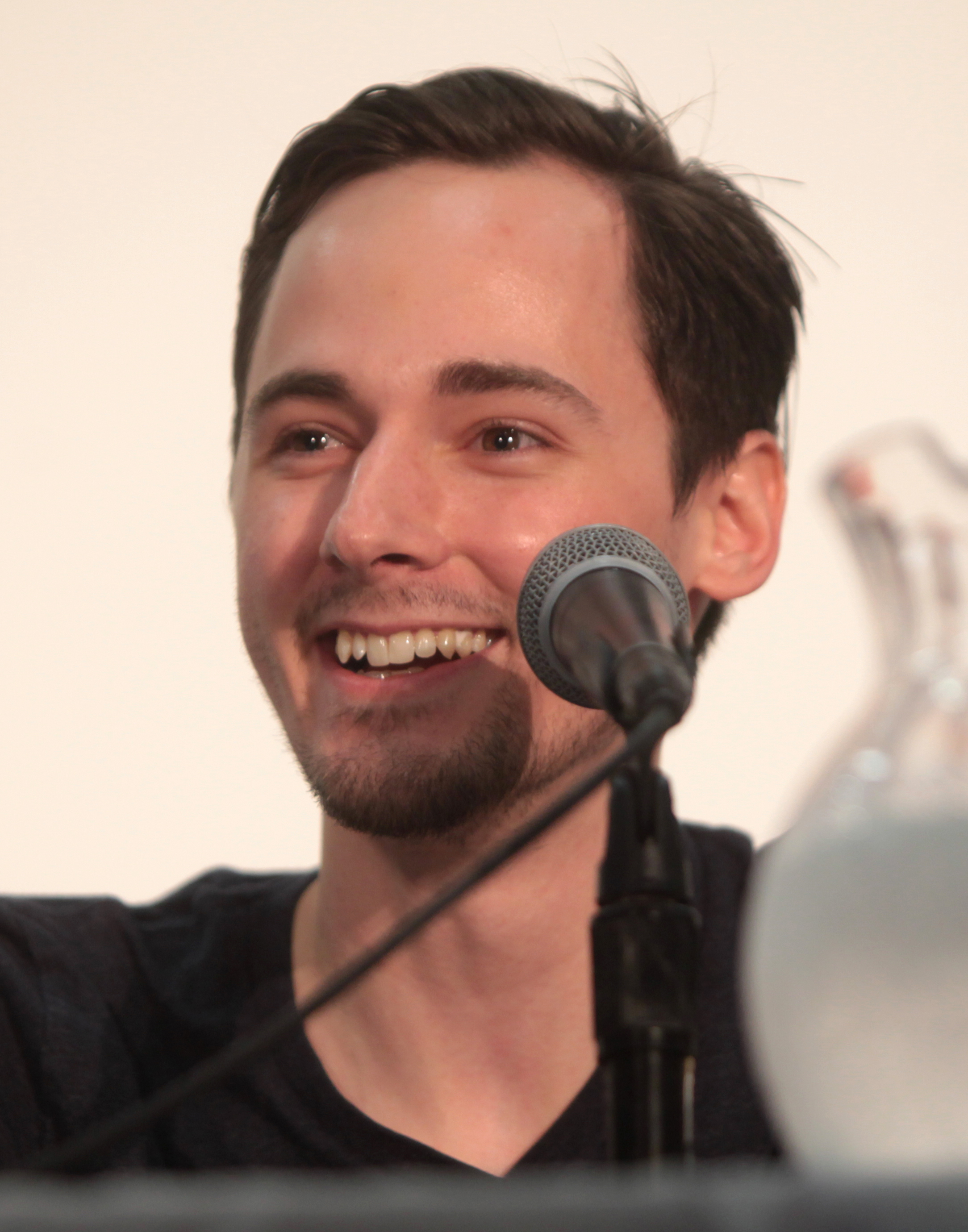
Jake Thomas

- January 1
  - Ashante "Thee" Adonis, wrestler
  - Xavier Avery, baseball player
- January 3 – Dahmar Wartts-Smiles, hurdler
- January 5 – Darvin Adams, football player
- January 6 – Natalie Palamides, voice actress
- January 7
  - Liam Aiken, actor
  - Camryn Grimes, actress
  - Michael Sam, football player
- January 8 – Jeff Allen, football player
- January 9
  - Justin Blackmon, football player
  - Melissa Ricks, Filipino-born actress
- January 10 – John Carlson, ice hockey player
- January 11 – Ryan Griffin, football player
- January 14
  - Kacy Catanzaro, wrestler and gymnast
  - Grant Gustin, actor and singer
- January 15
  - Chris Warren, actor
  - Luke Willson, football player
- January 18 – Zeeko Zaki, Egyptian-born actor
- January 21
  - Kelly Rohrbach, model and actress
  - Jacob Smith, actor
- January 22
  - Yousef Erakat, YouTuber
  - Logic, rapper, singer/songwriter, and record producer
- January 24 – Jahleel Addae, football player
- January 25 – Daniel Hernández Jr., politician
- January 26
  - Kherington Payne, dancer and actress
  - Christopher Massey, actor
- January 29
  - Charlie Cipriano, lacrosse player
  - Nick Moody, football player
  - Brandon Taylor, football player
- January 30
  - Eddy Alvarez, baseball player
  - Jazmyne Avant, soccer player
  - Ryan Scott Graham, bassist for State Champs
  - Anne Schleper, ice hockey player
  - Jake Thomas, actor
- January 31
  - Conor Allen, ice hockey player
  - Nate Augspurger, rugby player

=== February ===
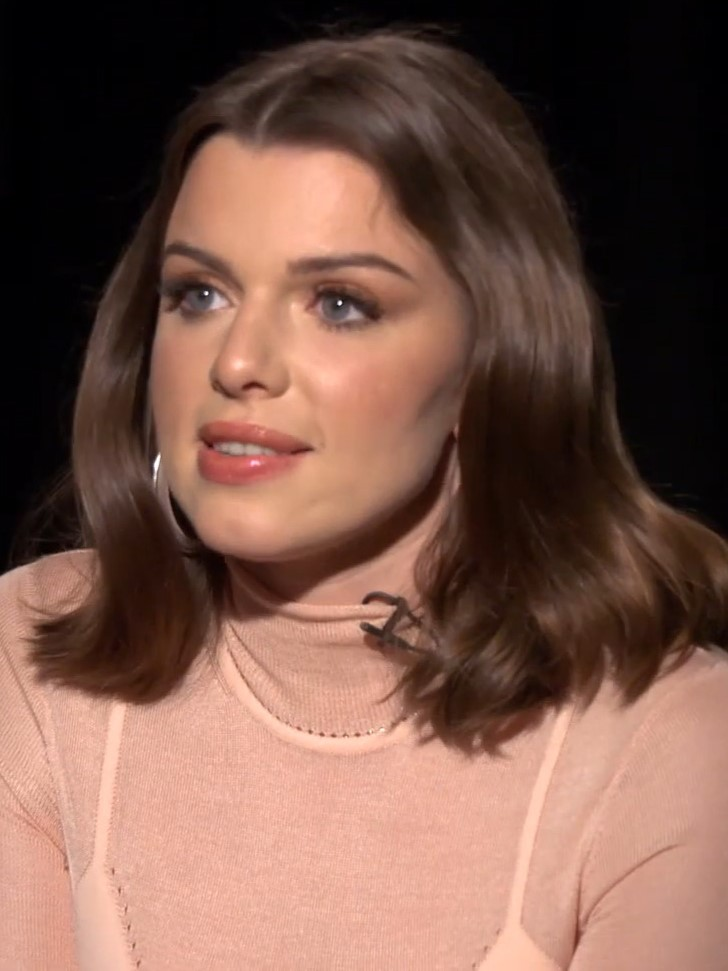
Julia Fox

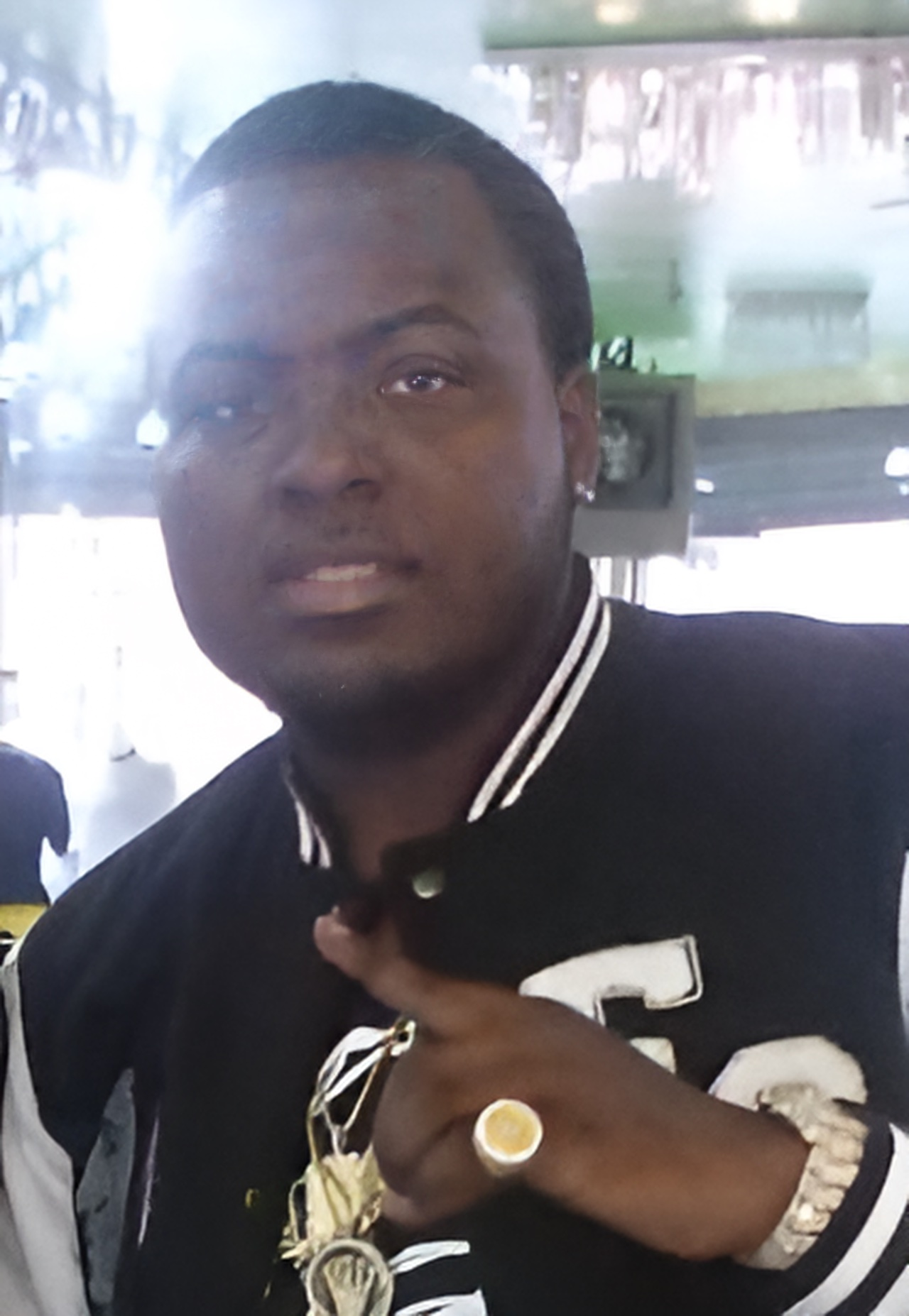
Sean Kingston

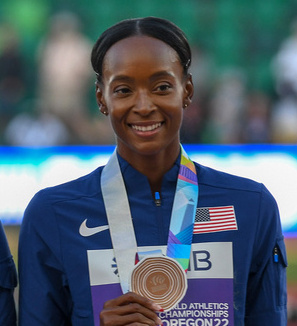
Dalilah Muhammad

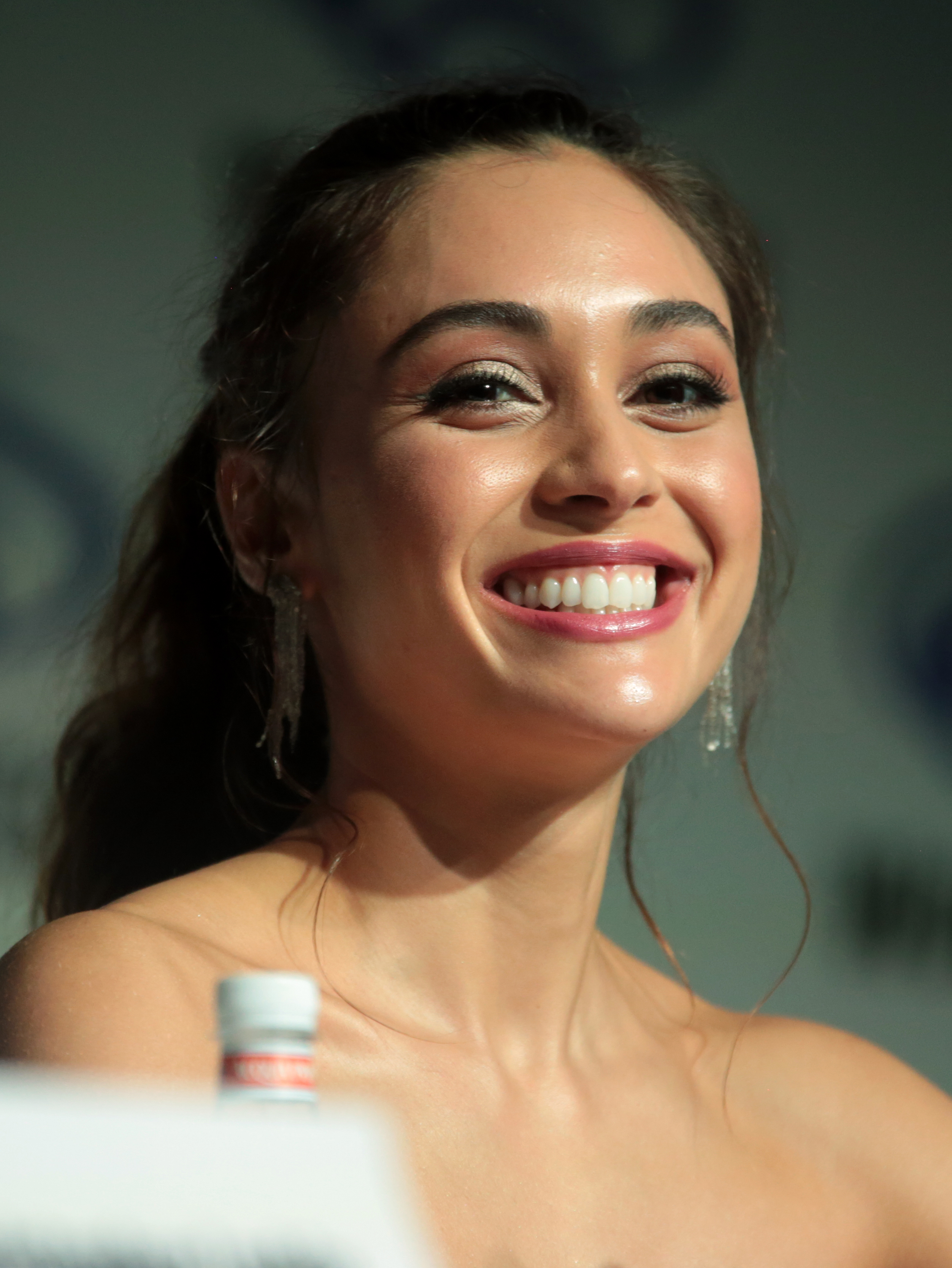
Lindsey Morgan

- February 2 – Julia Fox, actress and model
- February 3 – Sean Kingston, singer
- February 4 – Zach King, internet personality, filmmaker, and illusionist
- February 6 – Jermaine Kearse, football player
- February 7 – Dalilah Muhammad, Olympic hurdler
- February 8
  - Christian Madsen, actor
  - Ben Schnetzer, actor
  - Klay Thompson, basketball player
- February 9 – Camille Winbush, actress
- February 10 – Trevante Rhodes, actor
- February 11 – Q'orianka Kilcher, German-born actress and activist
- February 12 – Robert Griffin III, football player
- February 14
  - Nancy Avesyan, American-born Armenian footballer
  - Cola Boyy, musician and activist (d. 2024)
  - Jake Weary, actor
- February 17 – Jamie Alvord, cyclist
- February 18
  - Monica Aksamit, Olympic fencer
  - Scott Anderson, racing driver
- February 20 – Derek Anderson, mixed martial artist
- February 22
  - Kyle Greig, soccer player
  - Travis Releford, basketball player
- February 23
  - Shelby Blackstock, race car driver
  - Olivia Jean, singer
- February 24
  - Dwayne Allen, football player
  - Jason Coats, baseball player
  - Caleb McSurdy, football player
  - Derek Wolfe, football player
- February 25 – RaShaun Allen, football player
- February 26 – Chris Banjo, football player
- February 27
  - Adam Morgan, baseball player
  - Lindsey Morgan, actress
  - Megan Young, Filipino-born actress, model, television host, and beauty contest title holder, Miss World 2013
- February 28 – Ryan Allen, football player

=== March ===
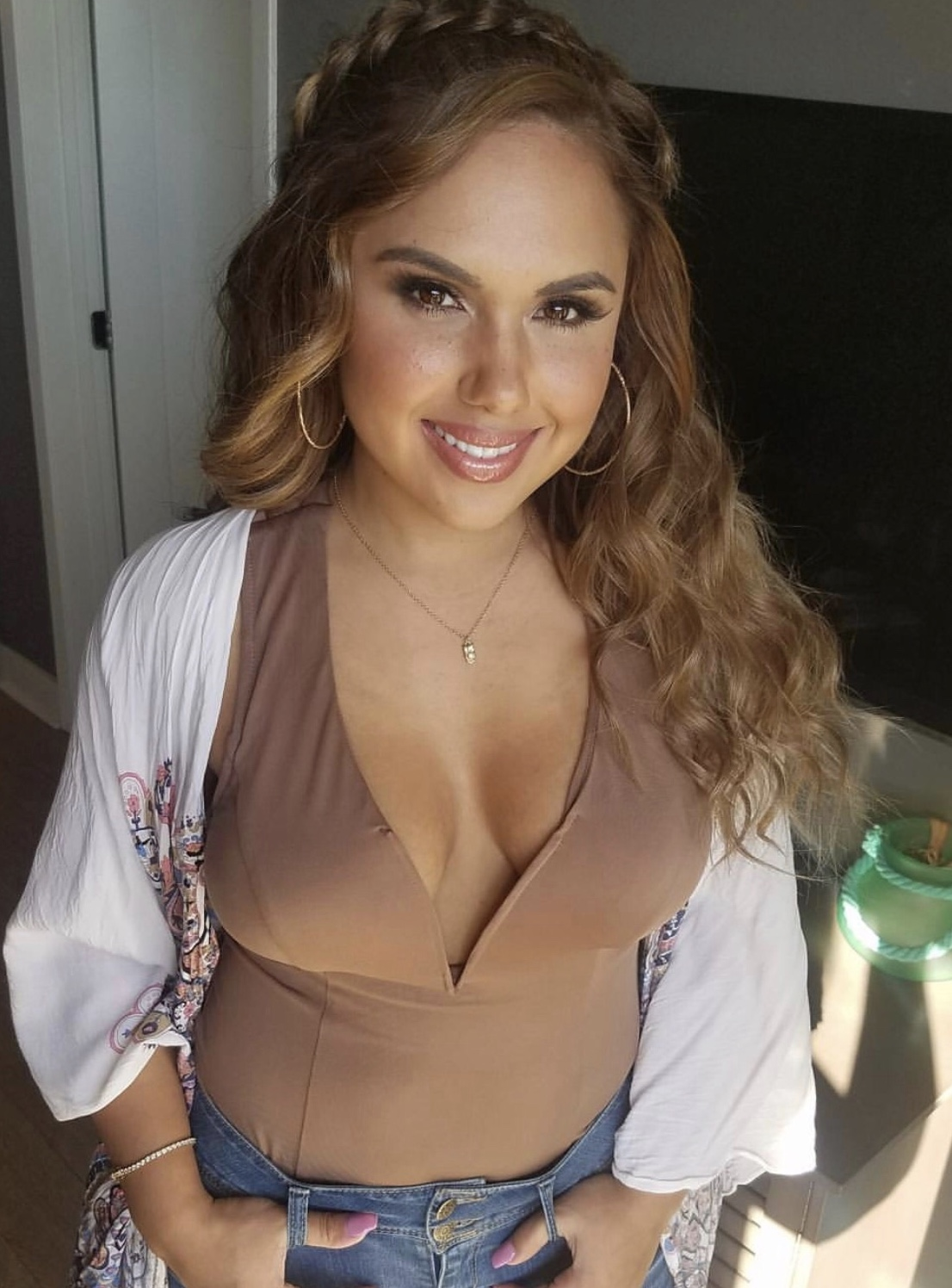
Kristinia DeBarge

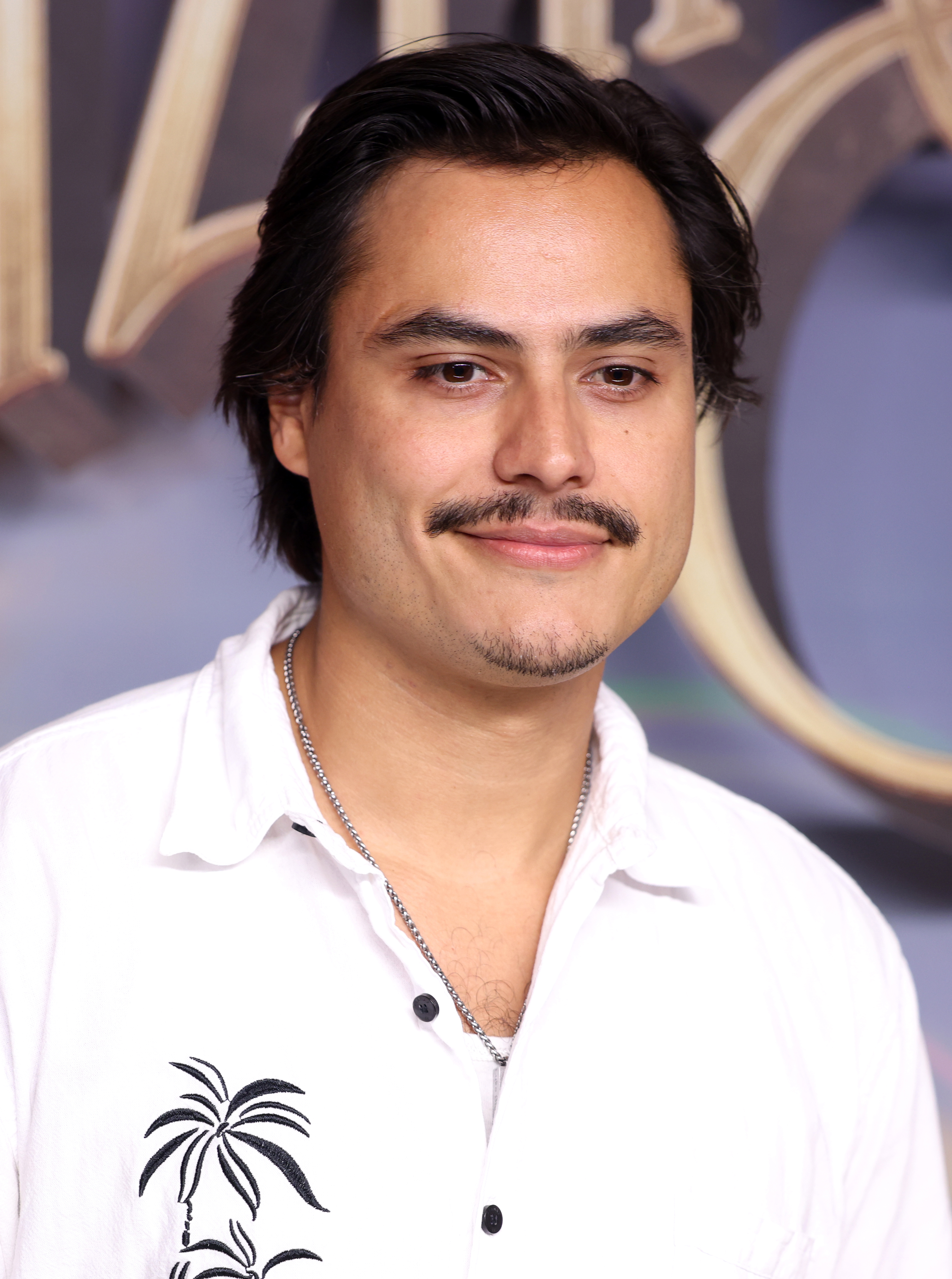
Kiowa Gordon

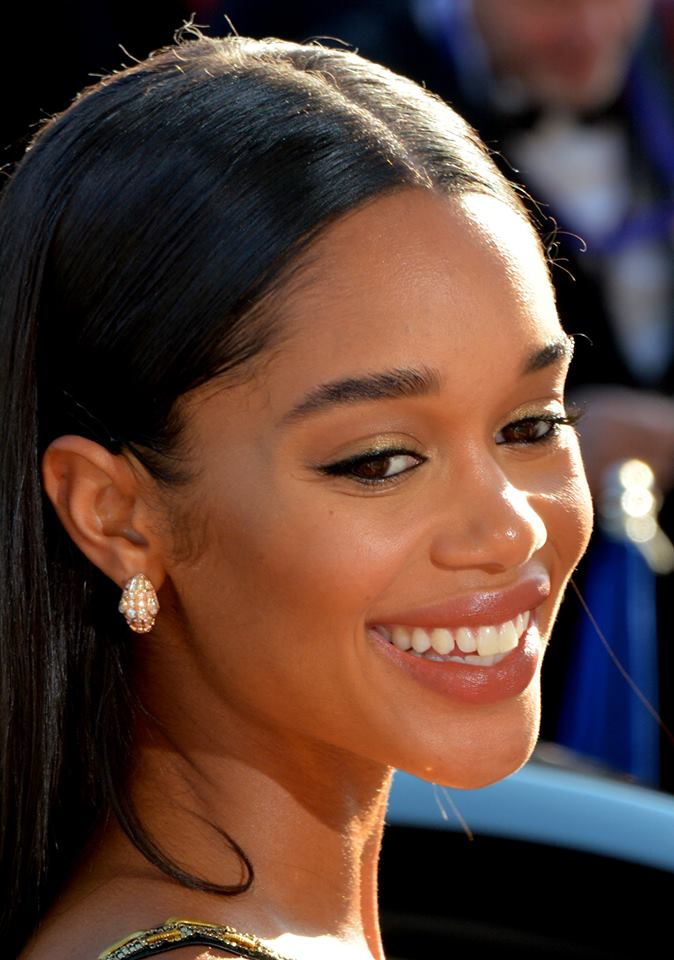
Laura Harrier

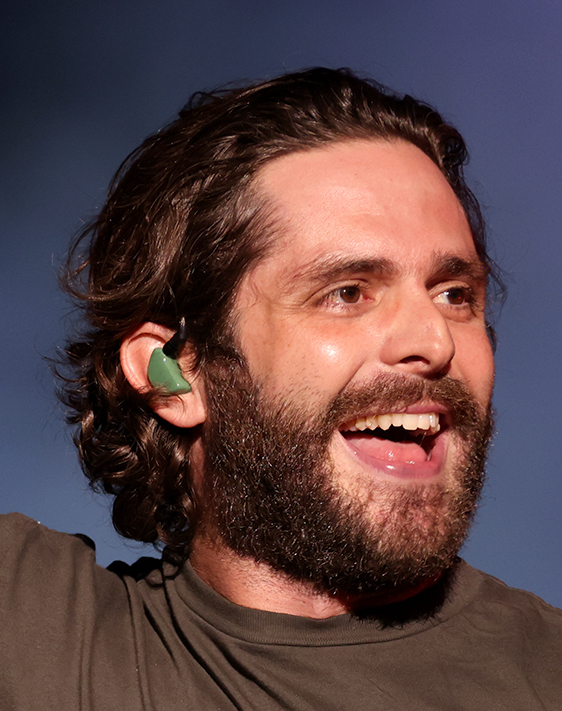
Thomas Rhett

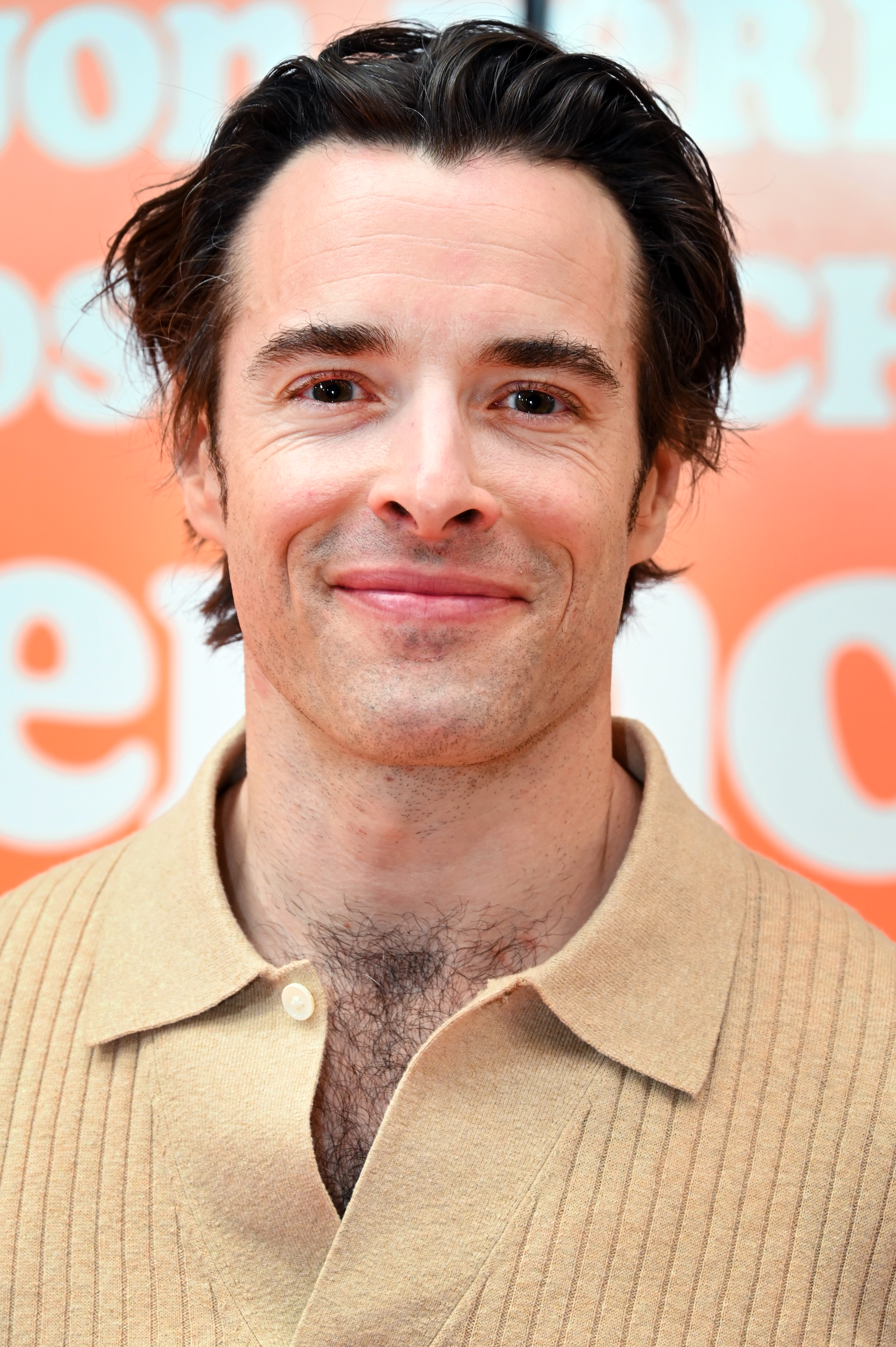
Corey Cott

- March 2 – YesJulz, social media personality
- March 4
  - Andrea Bowen, actress
  - Draymond Green, basketball player
- March 6 – Demitrius Bronson, football player and pro wrestler
- March 7 – Chase Owens, pro wrestler
- March 8
  - Yvonne Anderson, basketball player
  - Kristinia DeBarge, singer/songwriter
  - Abby and Brittany Hensel, conjoined twins
- March 9 – YG, rapper and actor
- March 10
  - Mike Adams, football player
  - Ryan Nassib, football player
- March 11 – Reiley McClendon, actor
- March 13 – Emory Cohen, actor
- March 15
  - Nick Ahmed, baseball player
  - Lauren Barfield, volleyball player
  - Siobhan Magnus, singer
- March 17 – Rizza Islam, conspiracy theorist
- March 18
  - Michael Knowles, conservative political commentator
  - Luke Tarsitano, actor
- March 20 – Tessa Violet, musician and online personality
- March 22
  - Sophie Caldwell Hamilton, cross-country skier
  - Claire Huangci, classical pianist
- March 24
  - Lacey Evans, wrestler
  - JonTron, YouTuber/Reviewer
- March 25 – Kiowa Gordon, actor
- March 26
  - James Buescher, stock car driver
  - Carly Chaikin, actress
- March 28 – Laura Harrier, actress and model
- March 29 – Timothy Chandler, German-born soccer player
- March 30
  - Connor Arendell, golfer
  - Corey Cott, actor and singer
  - Cassie Scerbo, actress, singer, and dancer
  - Thomas Rhett, singer/songwriter
  - Matt Simpson, Paralympic goalball player

=== April ===
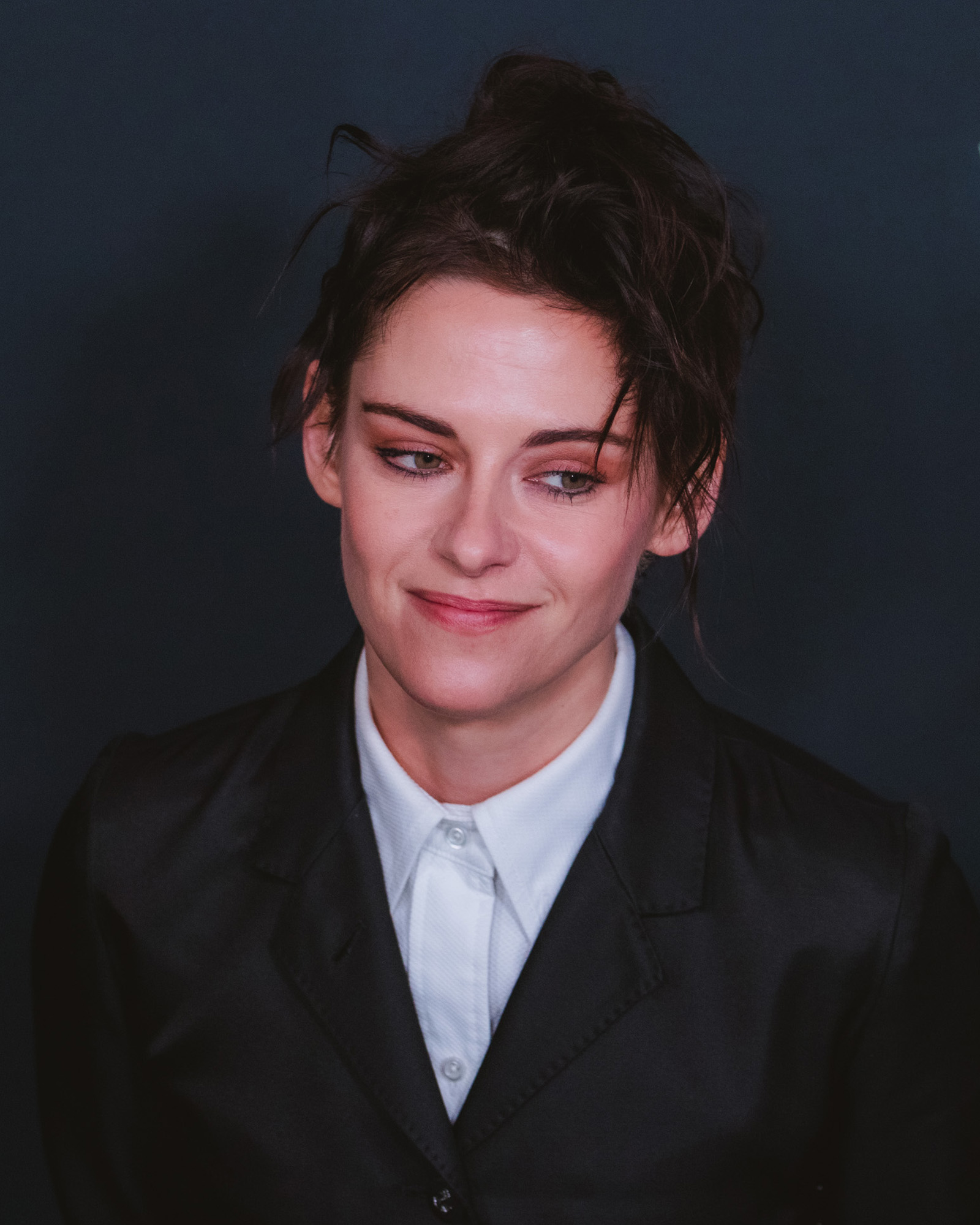
Kristen Stewart

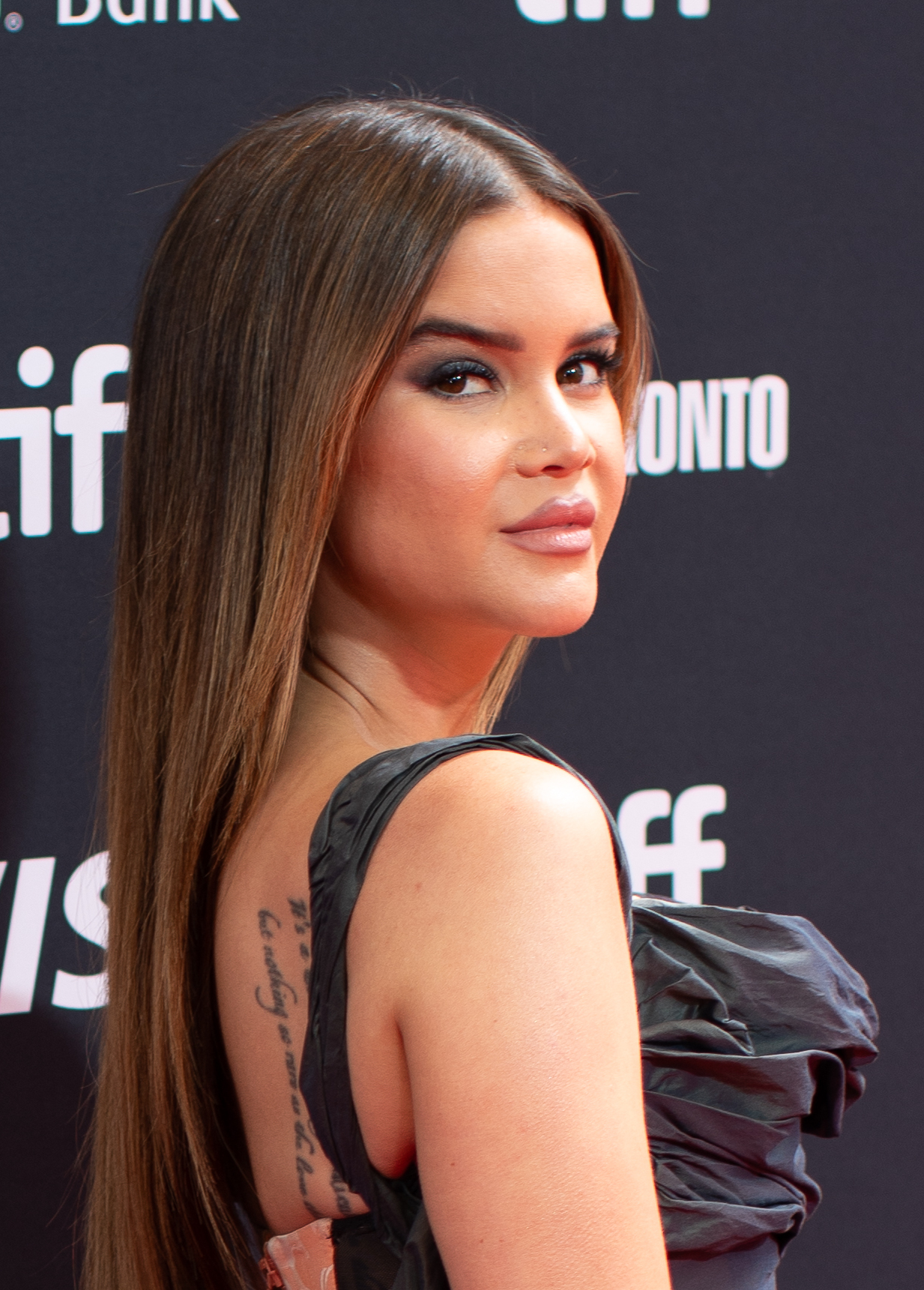
Maren Morris

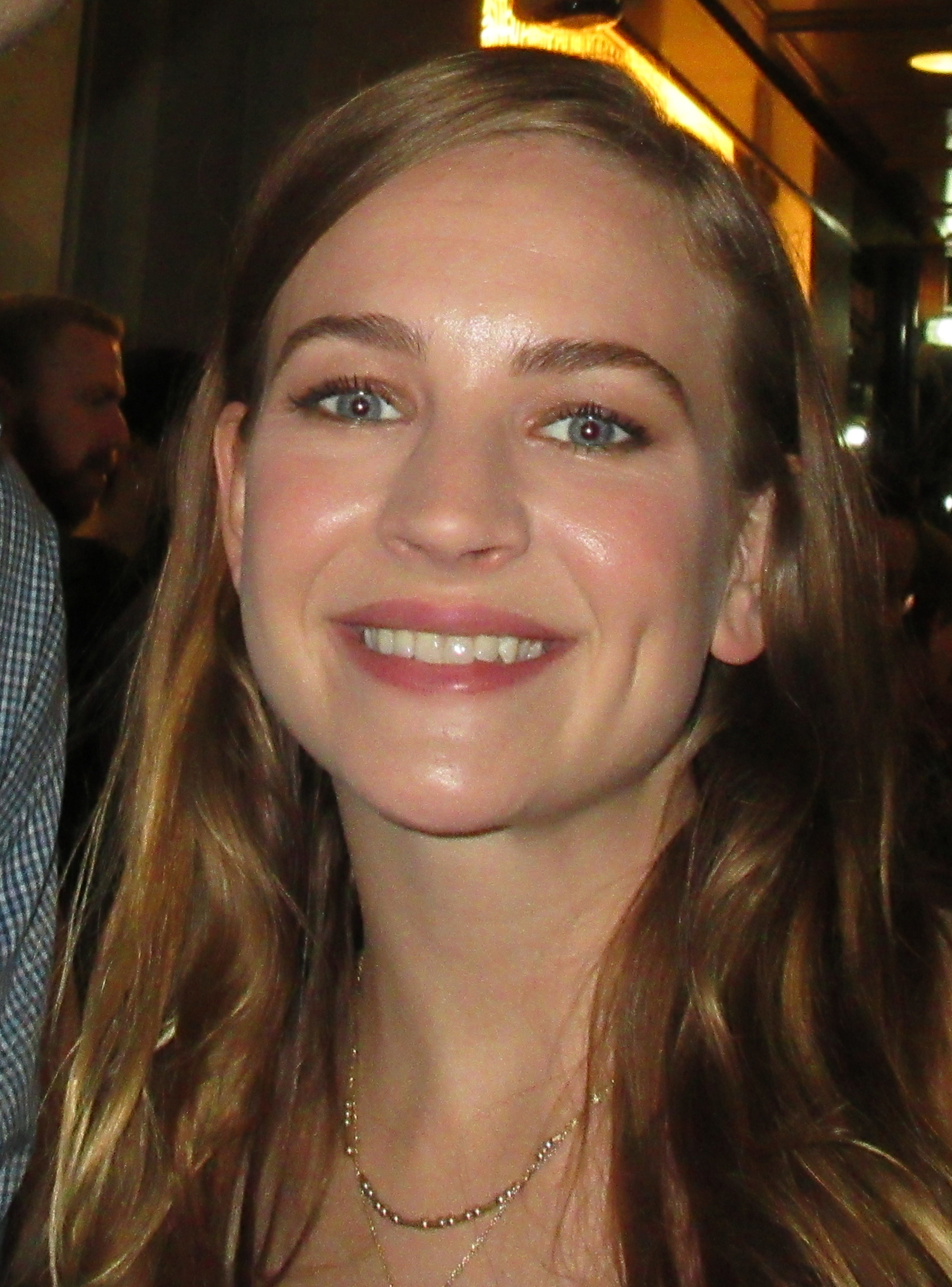
Britt Robertson

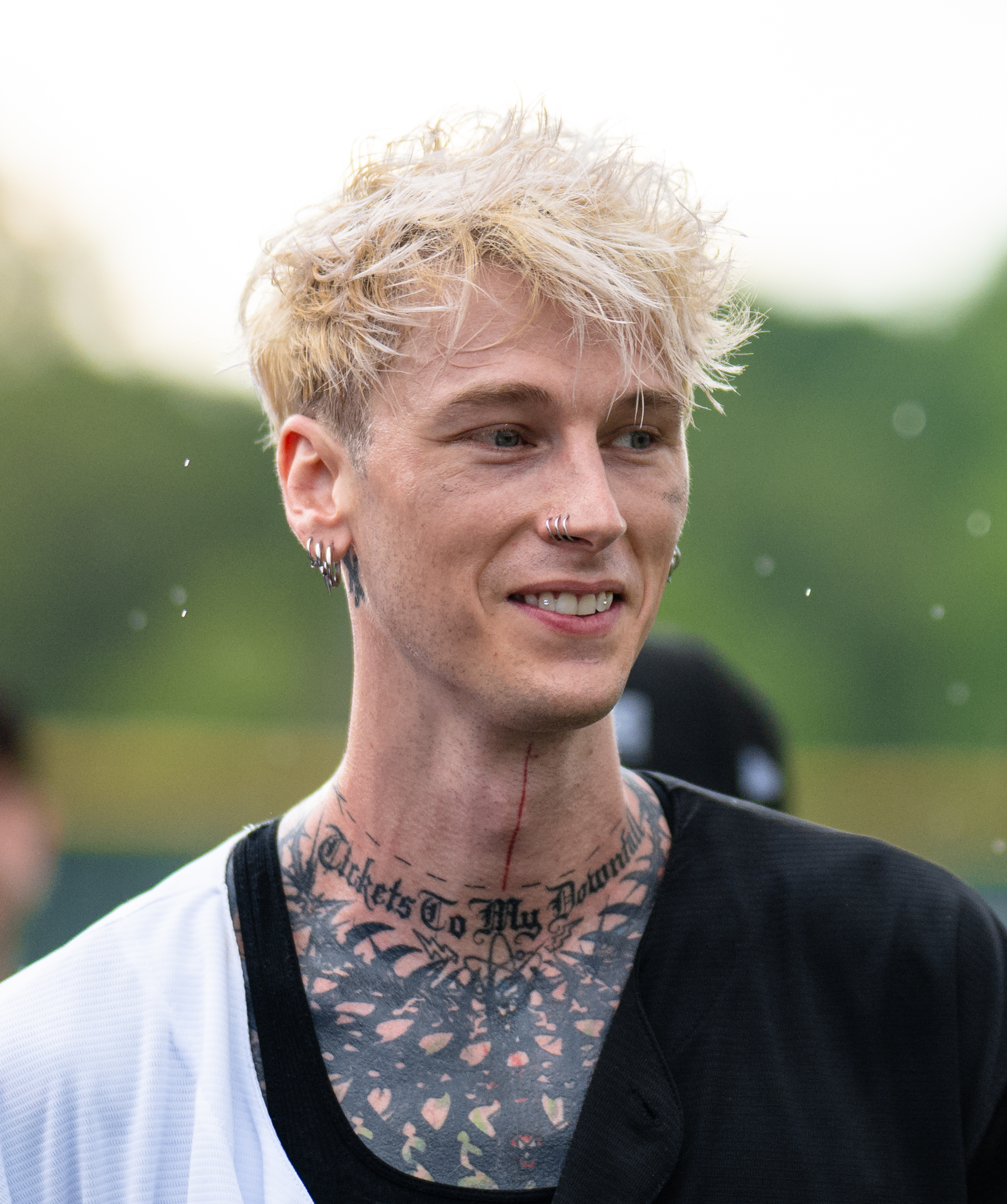
Machine Gun Kelly

- April 1
  - Naser Jason Abdo, US Army soldier and convict terrorist
  - Justin Hamilton, Croatian-born football player
- April 2
  - Roscoe Dash, rapper and singer
  - Madman Fulton, pro wrestler
- April 3 – Madison Brengle, tennis player
- April 4 – Matthew Aucoin, composer, conductor, pianist, and writer
- April 6 – Charlie McDermott, actor
- April 8
  - Chuggaaconroy, YouTuber
  - Kind Butler III, sprinter
  - TimTheTatman, livestreamer
- April 9 – Kristen Stewart, actress and director
- April 10 – Maren Morris, country singer
- April 11 – Darrius Garrett, American-born Rwandan basketball player
- April 14
  - Danny Agbelese, basketball player
  - Christian Alexander, Greek-born actor
- April 16
  - Tony McQuay, Olympic sprinter
  - Lorraine Nicholson, actress
  - Travis Shaw, baseball player
- April 17 – R. J. Allen, soccer player
- April 18 – Britt Robertson, actress
- April 21 – Bree Essrig, actress
- April 22
  - Rob Bresnahan, businessman and politician
  - Machine Gun Kelly, actor, rapper, and singer
- April 23 – Matthew Underwood, actor
- April 24
  - Camille Ashton, soccer player
  - Carly Pearce, country singer
- April 26 – Riley Voelkel, American-born Canadian actress
- April 27 – Austin Dillon, stock car driver
- April 28 – Chelsea Stewart, soccer player
- April 29
  - Bradford Burgess, basketball player
  - Chris Johnson, basketball player

=== May ===
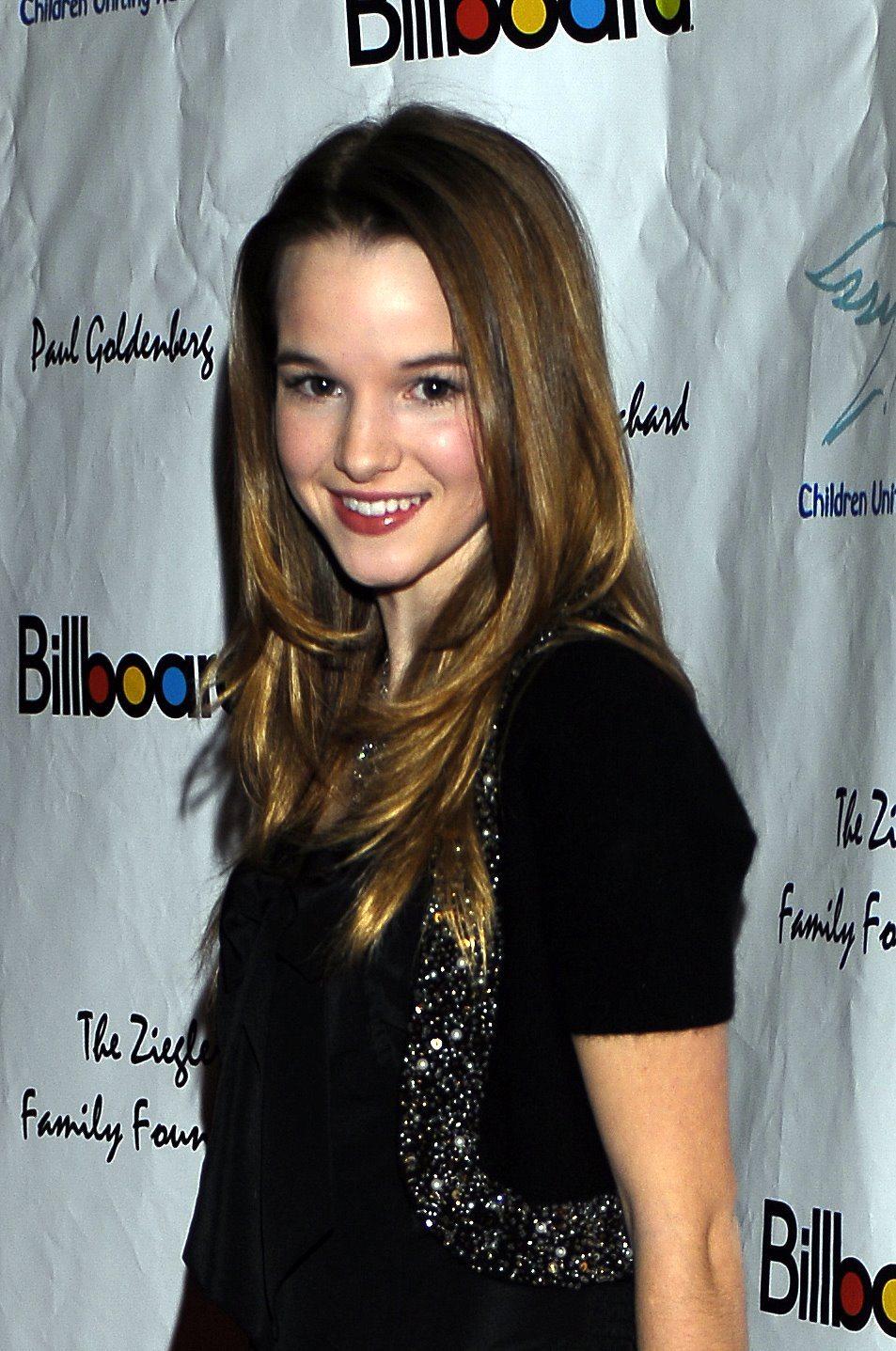
Kay Panabaker

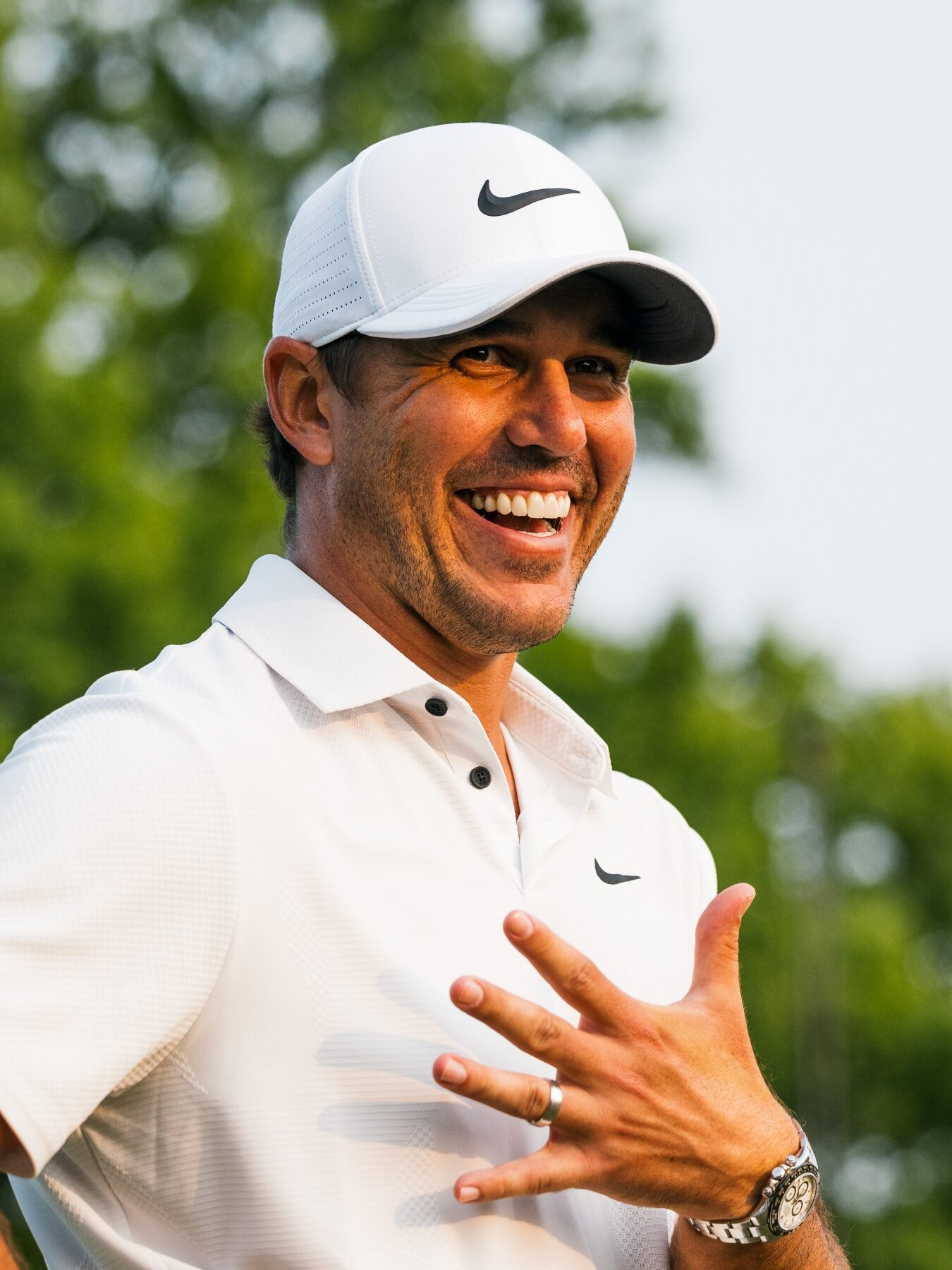
Brooks Koepka

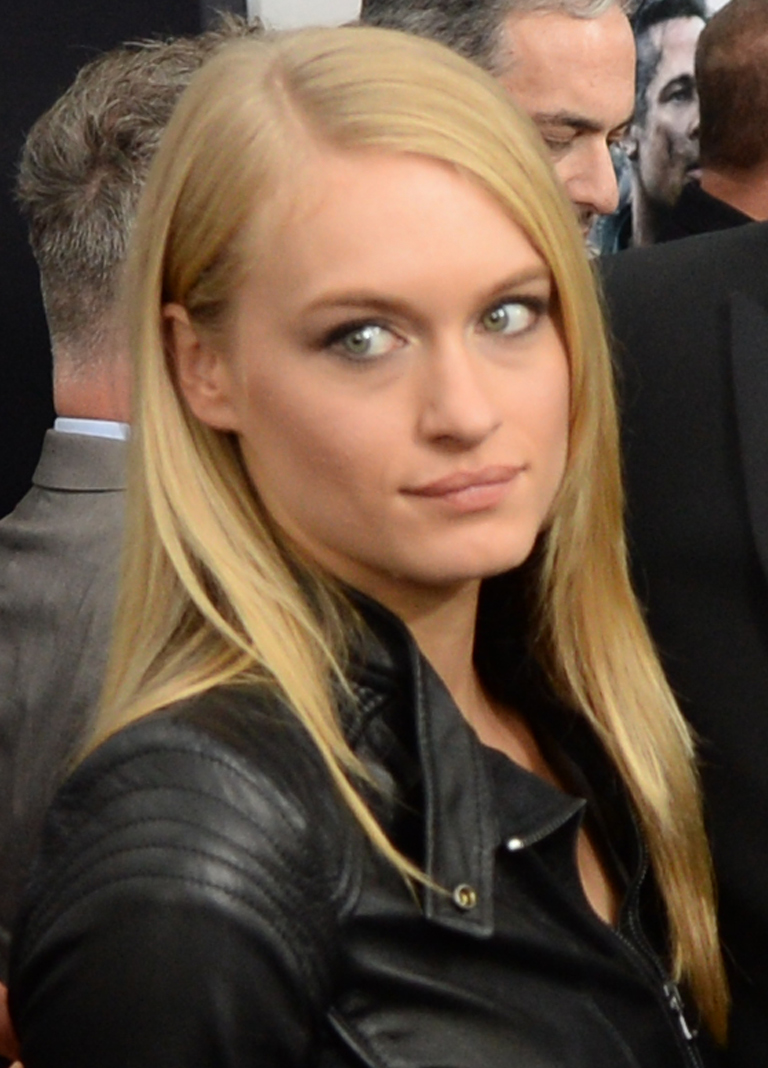
Leven Rambin

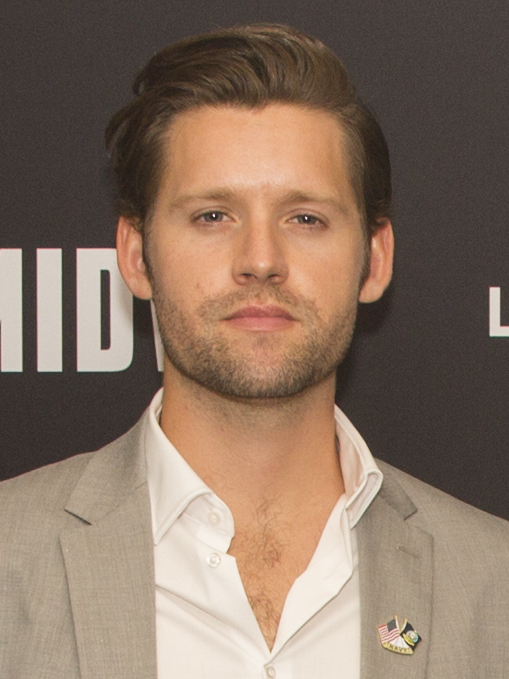
Luke Kleintank

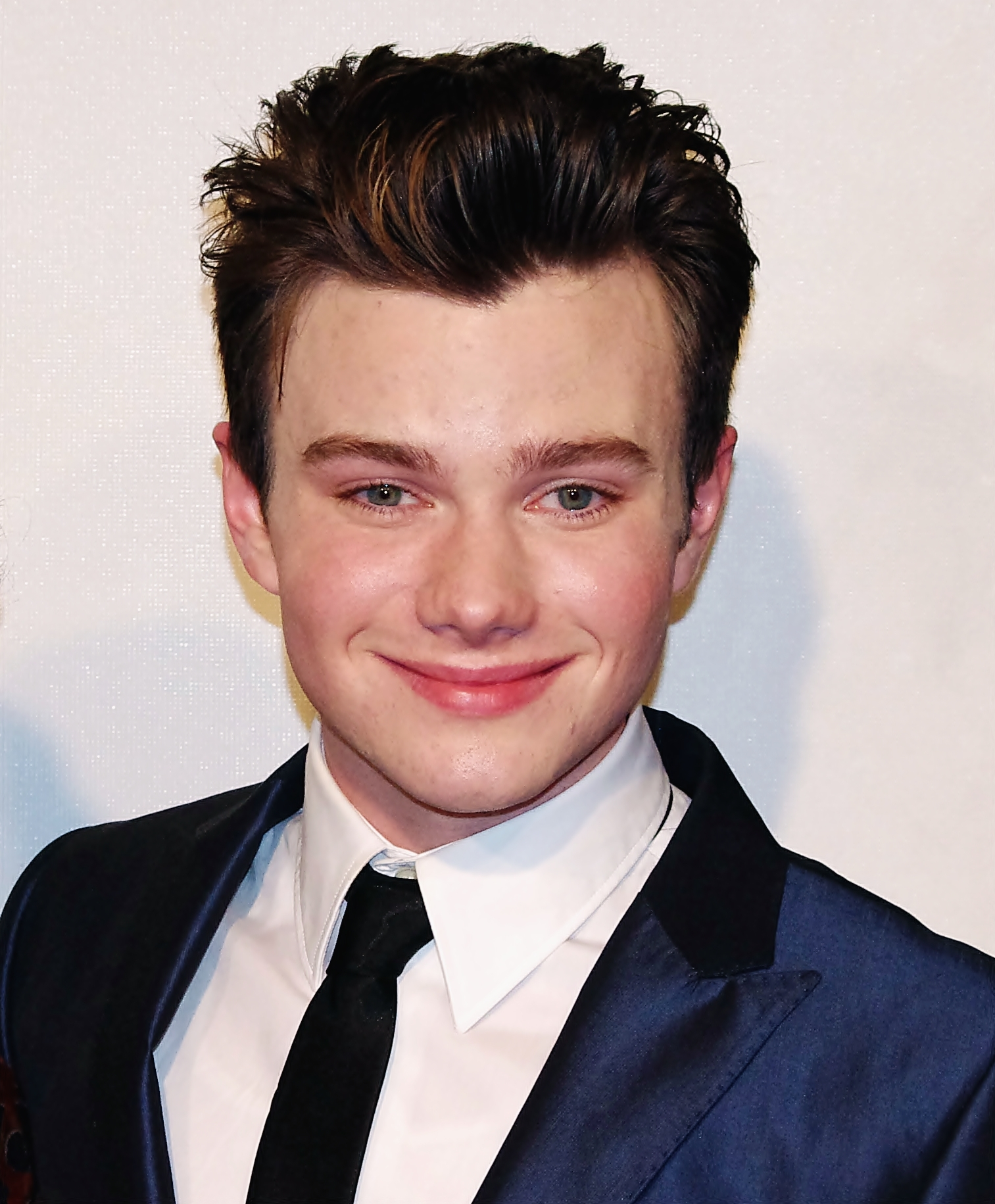
Chris Colfer

- May 2
  - Paul George, basketball player
  - Kay Panabaker, actress
- May 3
  - Harvey Guillén, actor
  - Brooks Koepka, golfer
- May 5
  - Michele Fitzgerald, television personality
  - Hannah Jeter, model
  - Tatiana Schlossberg, environmental journalist and author (d. 2025)
- May 6
  - Moses Storm, writer and comedian
  - Caitlin Yankowskas, figure skater
- May 7 – Jonathan Zlotnik, politician
- May 8 – Kemba Walker, basketball player
- May 9 – John McEntee, political advisor
- May 10
  - Hannah Alcorn, voice actress
  - Brandun DeShay, rapper and record producer
  - Lauren Potter, actress
- May 11 – Taylor Fletcher, Olympic Nordic combined skier
- May 12
  - Etika, YouTuber, rapper, and model (d. 2019)
  - Jacory Harris, football player
  - Shungudzo, singer and television personality
- May 14
  - Amber Portwood reality television personality and criminal
  - Sasha Spielberg, musician
- May 16
  - I o, DJ and record producer (d. 2020)
  - Marc John Jefferies, actor
- May 17
  - Will Clyburn, basketball player
  - Ross Butler, actor
  - Kree Harrison, singer
  - Leven Rambin, actress
- May 18 – Luke Kleintank, actor
- May 21 – Trevor Andrews, curler
- May 22 – Kenny Anunike, football player and coach
- May 24
  - Bryce Hirschberg, director, screenwriter, producer, actor, and musical artist
  - Joey Logano, race car driver
- May 25
  - Bo Dallas, wrestler
  - Jarred Cosart, baseball player
  - Ryan Sherriff, baseball player
- May 26 – Eric Griffin, basketball player
- May 27 – Chris Colfer, actor
- May 29 – Erica Garner, civil rights activist (d. 2017)
- May 30 – Dean Collins, actor
- May 31 – Phillipa Soo, actress and singer

=== June ===
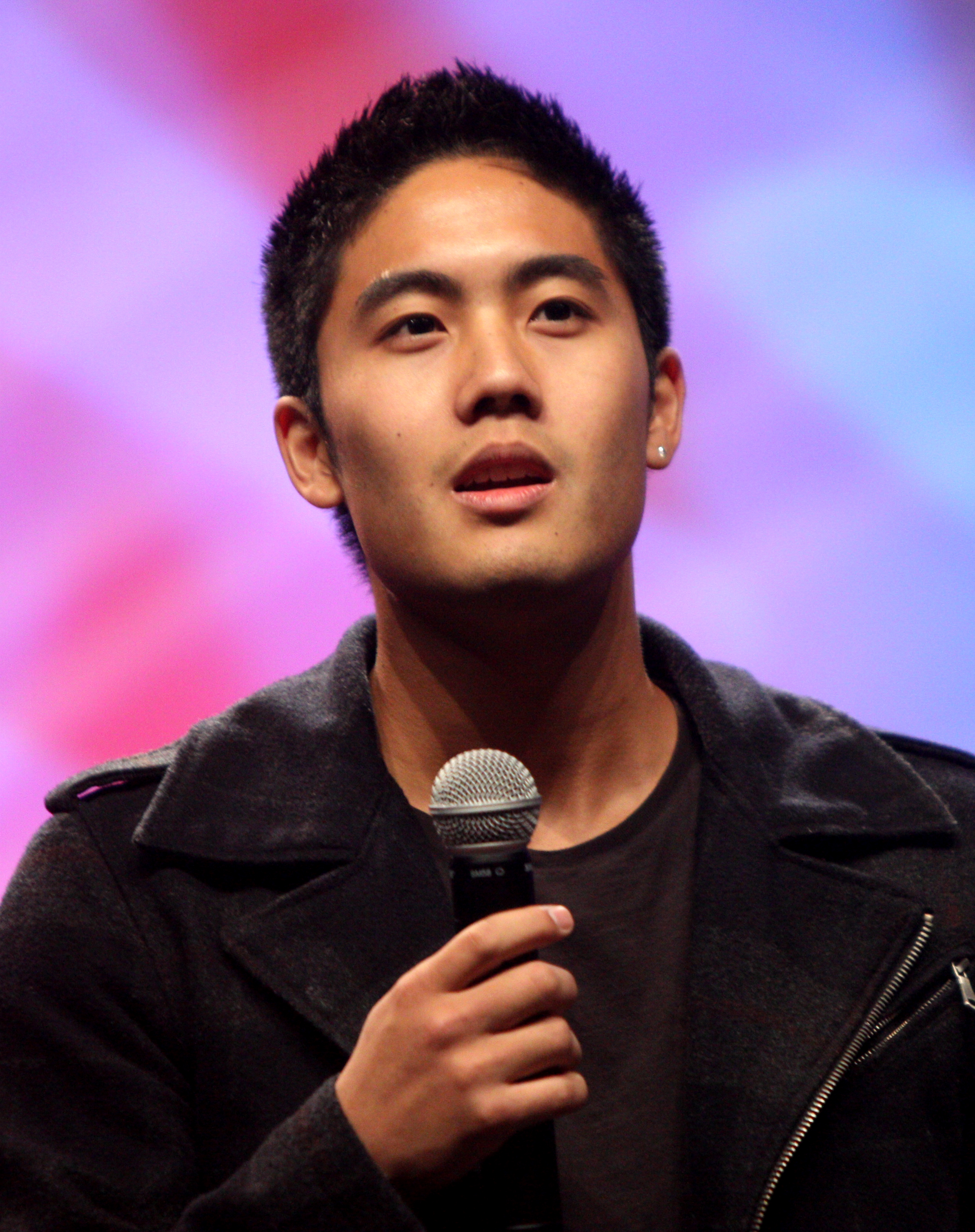
Ryan Higa

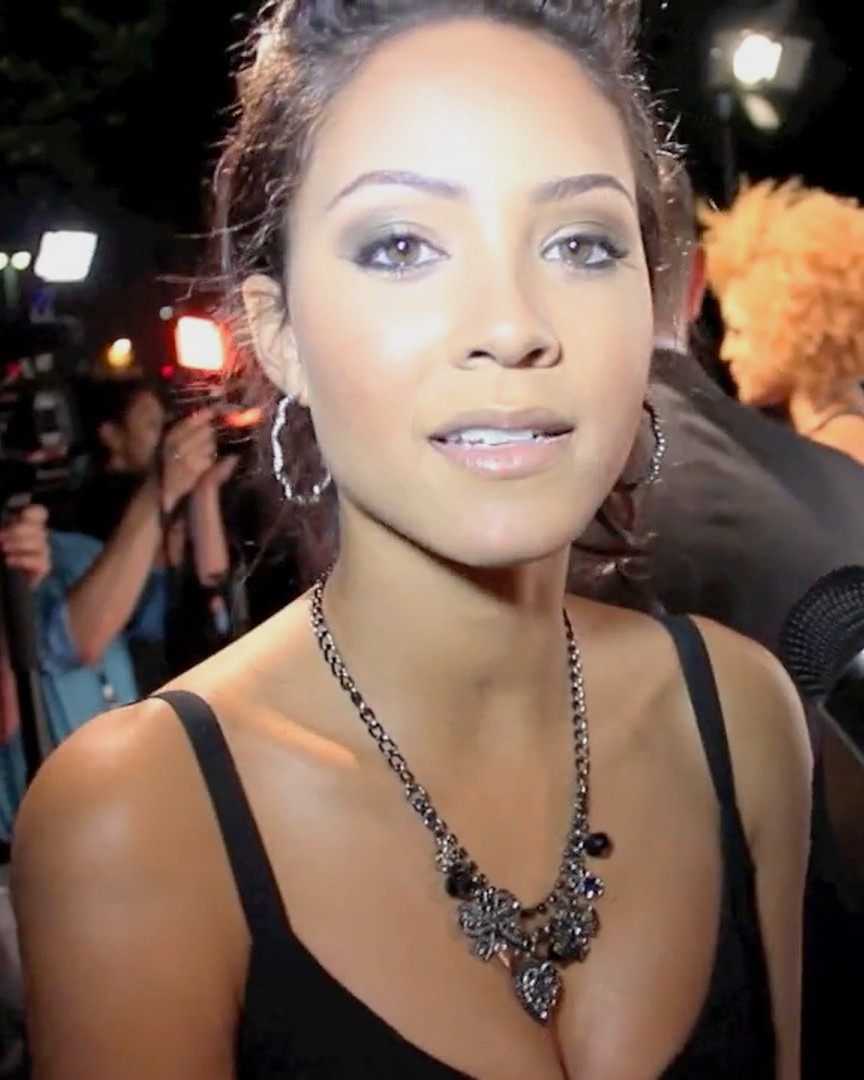
Tristin Mays

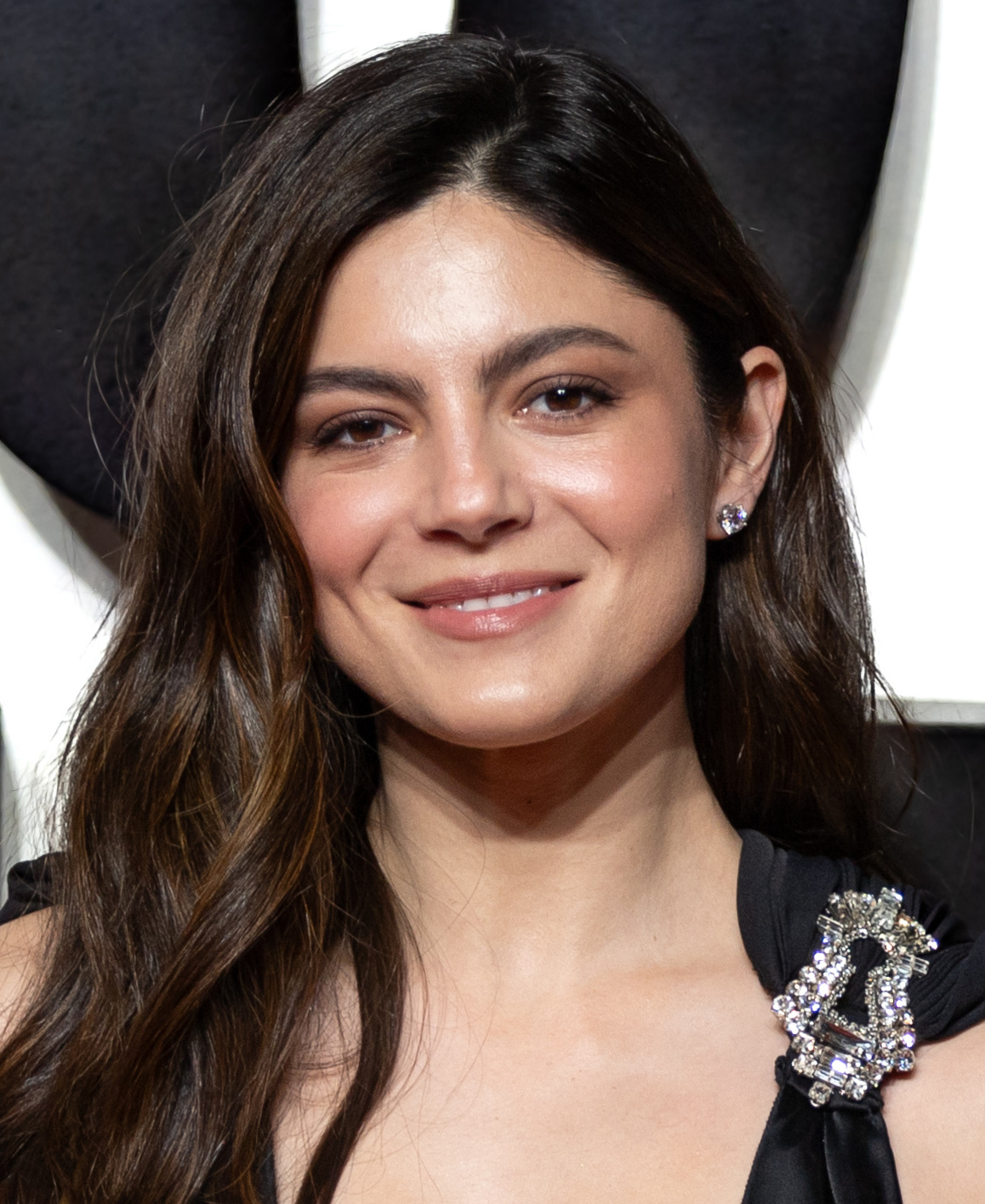
Monica Barbaro

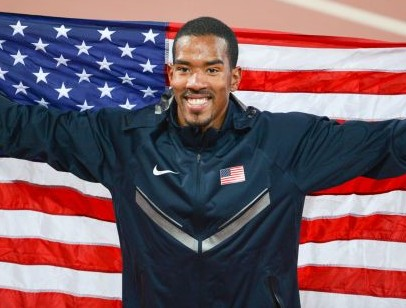
Christian Taylor

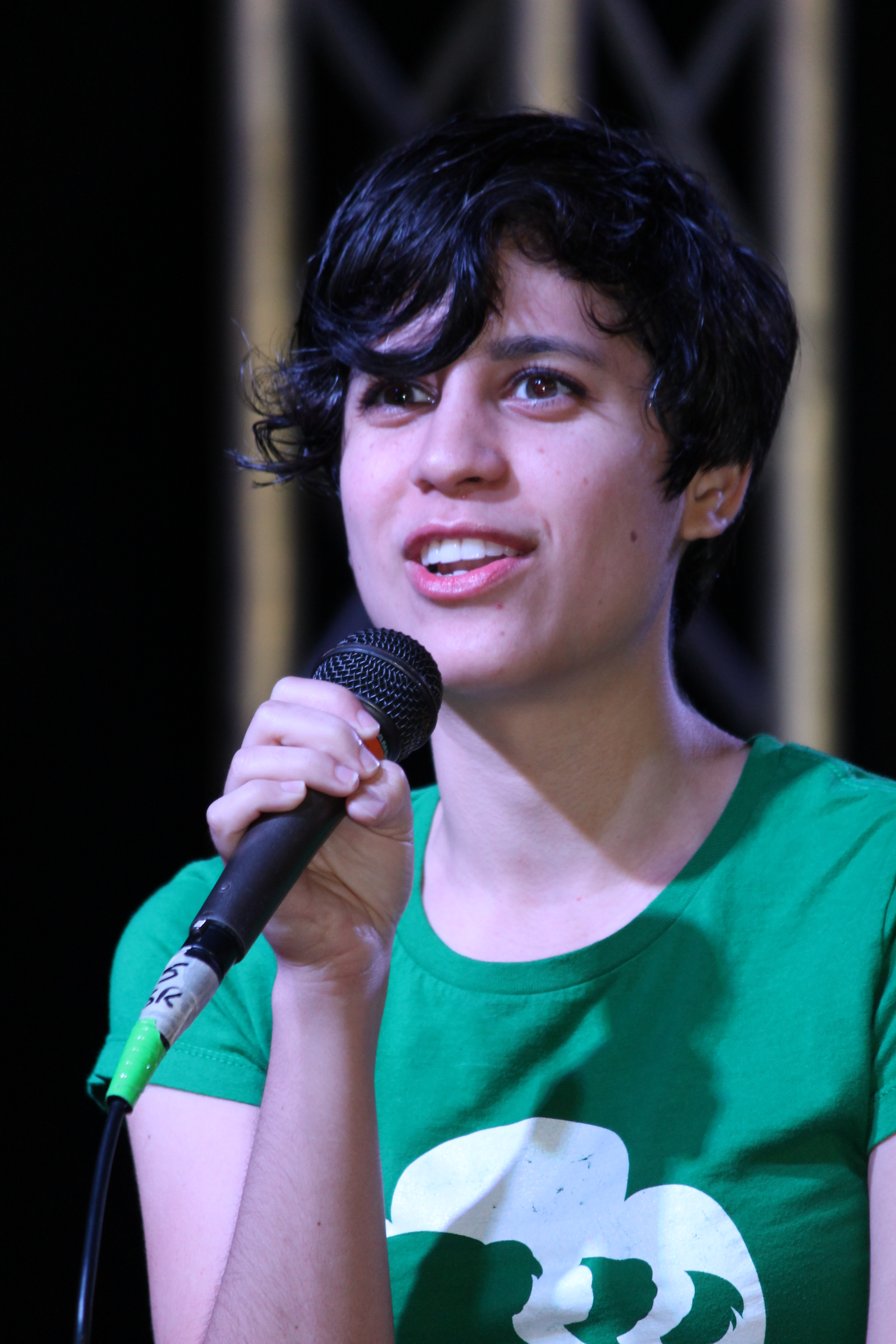
Ashly Burch

- June 2 – Brittany Curran, actress and singer
- June 3 – Rachael Adams, volleyball player
- June 4
  - Zac Farro, musician, singer/songwriter, and multi-instrumentalist, and drummer for Paramore
  - Evan Spiegel, co-founder and CEO of Snap Inc.
- June 5 – Kyle Pavone, singer and co-frontman for We Came As Romans (d. 2018)
- June 6
  - Mike G, rapper and member of Odd Future
  - Ryan Higa, YouTube personality
  - Anthony Rendon, baseball player
- June 7 – Allison Schmitt, Olympic swimmer
- June 8 – Johnny Franck, singer/songwriter and guitarist
- June 9 – John Andreoli, baseball player
- June 10 – Tristin Mays, actress and singer
- June 12
  - Luís Arias, boxer
  - Jrue Holiday, basketball player
  - Kevin Wu, blogger, activist, and humanitarian
- June 15 – Denzel Whitaker, actor
- June 16 – Austin Krajicek, tennis player
- June 18
  - Monica Barbaro, actress
  - Christian Taylor, Olympic triple jumper
- June 19
  - Ashly Burch, actress, singer, and writer
  - Xavier Rhodes, football player
- June 20
  - Colin Schmitt. politician
  - Jacob Wysocki, actor and comedian
- June 21 – Ra'eese Aleem, boxer
- June 22
  - Quinton Coples, football player
  - T. J. DiLeo, American-German basketball player
- June 23
  - Cameron Artis-Payne, football player
  - Rodney McLeod, football player
- June 26 – Brandon Sklenar, actor
- June 27 – Bobby Wagner, football player
- June 28 – Ape Drums, DJ and record producer
- June 30
  - Cody Asche, baseball player and coach
  - David Wise, freestyle skier

=== July ===
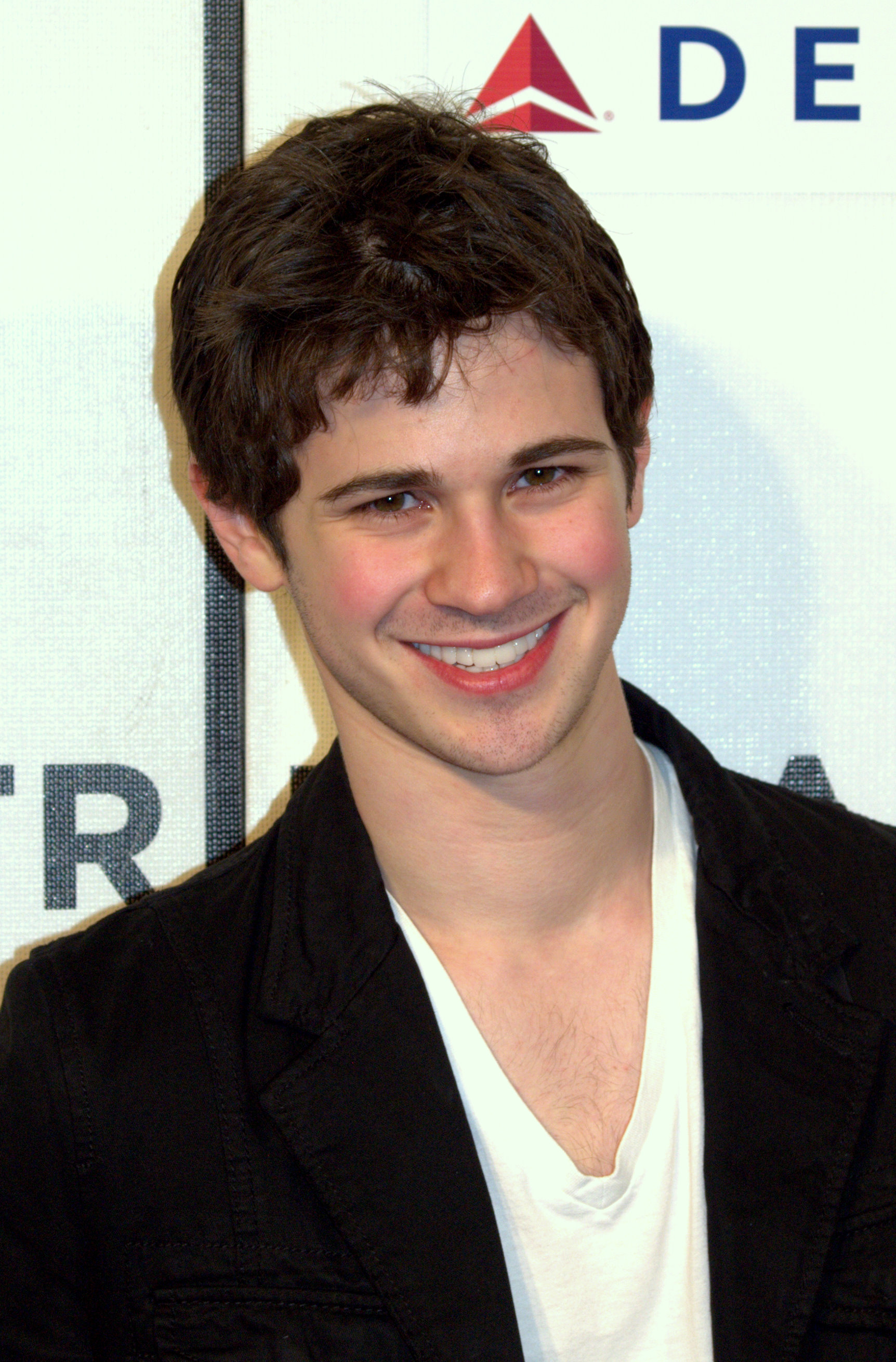
Connor Paolo

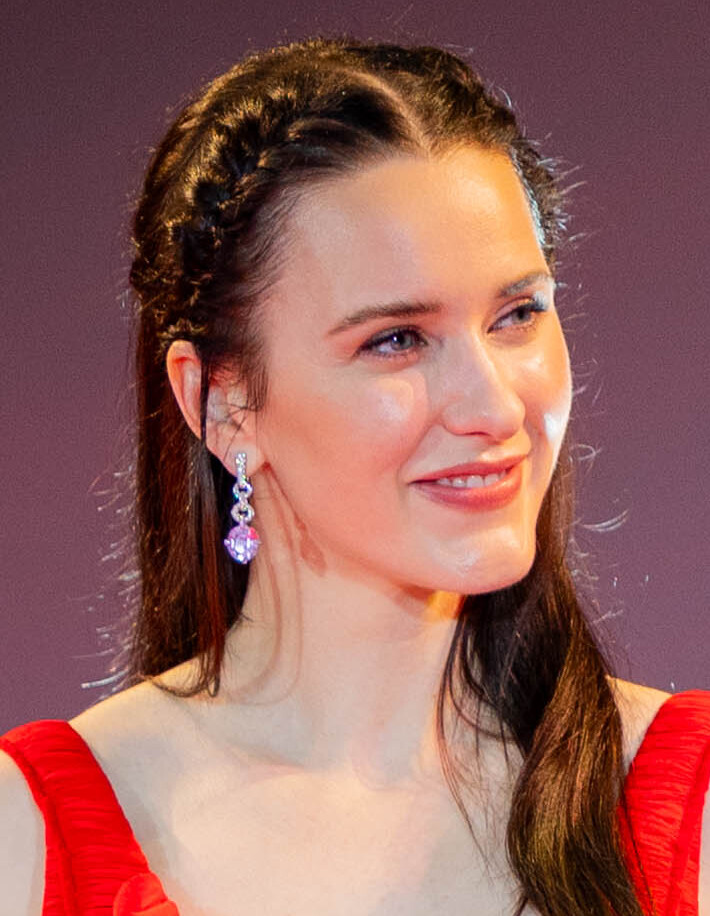
Rachel Brosnahan

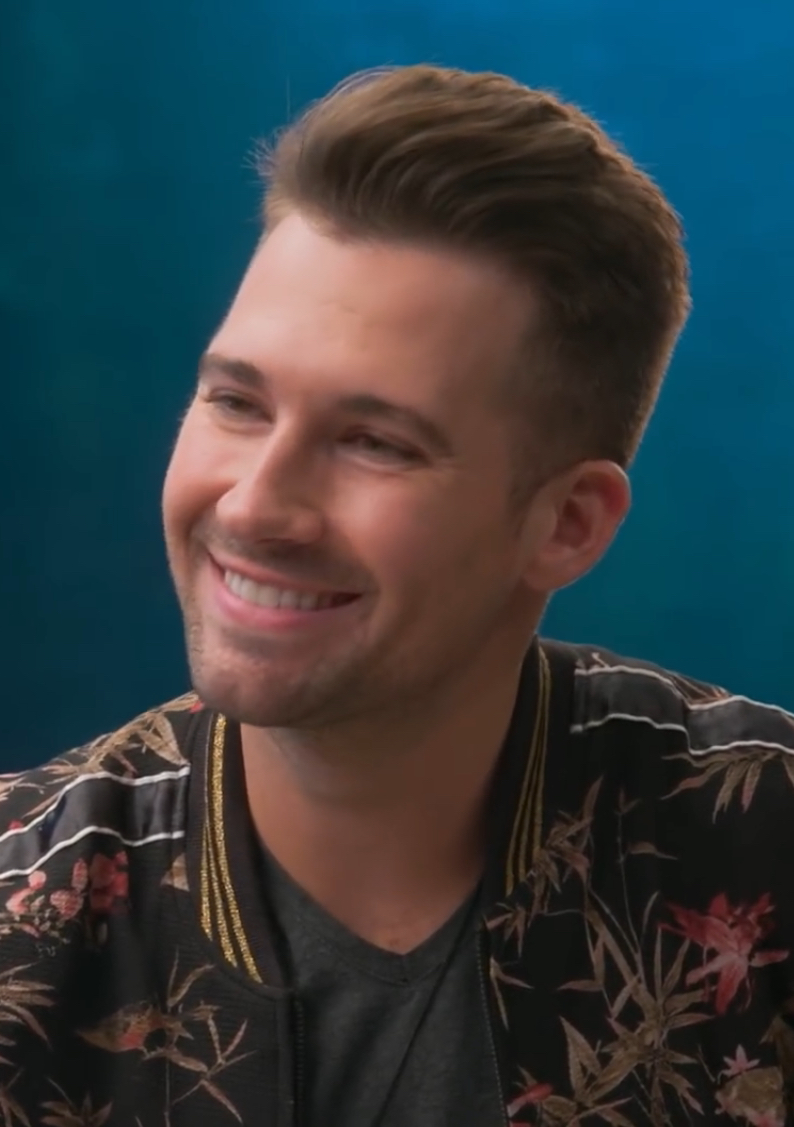
James Maslow

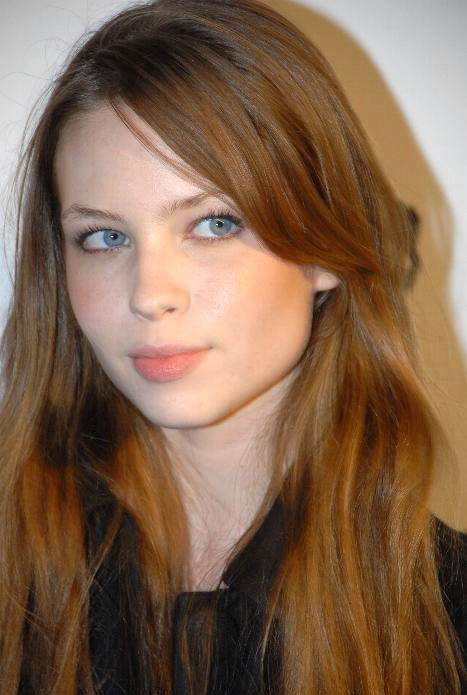
Daveigh Chase

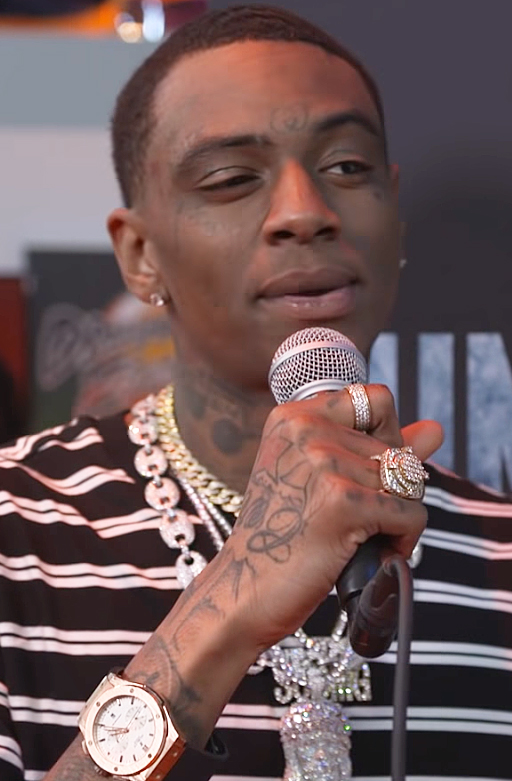
Soulja Boy

- July 2
  - ARTZ, rapper and songwriter
  - Kayla Harrison, judoka
  - Grey Henson, actor, dancer, and singer
  - Nneka Ogwumike, basketball player
- July 5 – Nick Anderson, baseball player
- July 6
  - Jourdana Phillips, model
  - Jeremy Suarez, actor
- July 7 – Amadeus Serafini, actor
- July 8 – Randy Brown, American-born Jamaican mixed martial artist
- July 9 – Rebekah Gardner, basketball player
- July 10
  - Robert Alon, racing driver
  - Mike LiPetri, politician
- July 11
  - Dan Colman, poker player
  - Connor Paolo, actor
  - Patrick Peterson, football player
  - Kelsey Sanders, actress
- July 12
  - Rachel Brosnahan, actress
  - Drew Gordon, basketball player (d. 2024)
  - Chasen Shreve, baseball player
- July 13 – Brooke Ammerman, ice hockey player
- July 15
  - Denico Autry, football player
  - Tyler Honeycutt, basketball player (d. 2018)
  - Damian Lillard, basketball player
- July 16 – James Maslow, actor and singer
- July 18
  - Jairo Aquino, soccer player
  - Mandy Rose, wrestler
- July 19
  - Armond Rizzo, gay pornographic actor
  - Steven Anthony Lawrence, actor
  - Darlington Nagbe, Liberian-born soccer player
- July 21 – Chris Amrhein, football player
- July 24
  - Apo Avedissian, Iraqi-born artist
  - Daveigh Chase, actress
- July 26 – Zach Kornfeld, internet personality
- July 27
  - Victoria Aveyard, writer
  - Nick Hogan, television personality
- July 28 – Soulja Boy, rapper
- July 29
  - Matt Prokop, actor
  - Evan Edinger, blogger
- July 30 – Molly McCook, actress
- July 31 – Ruby Modine, actress, dancer, and singer

=== August ===
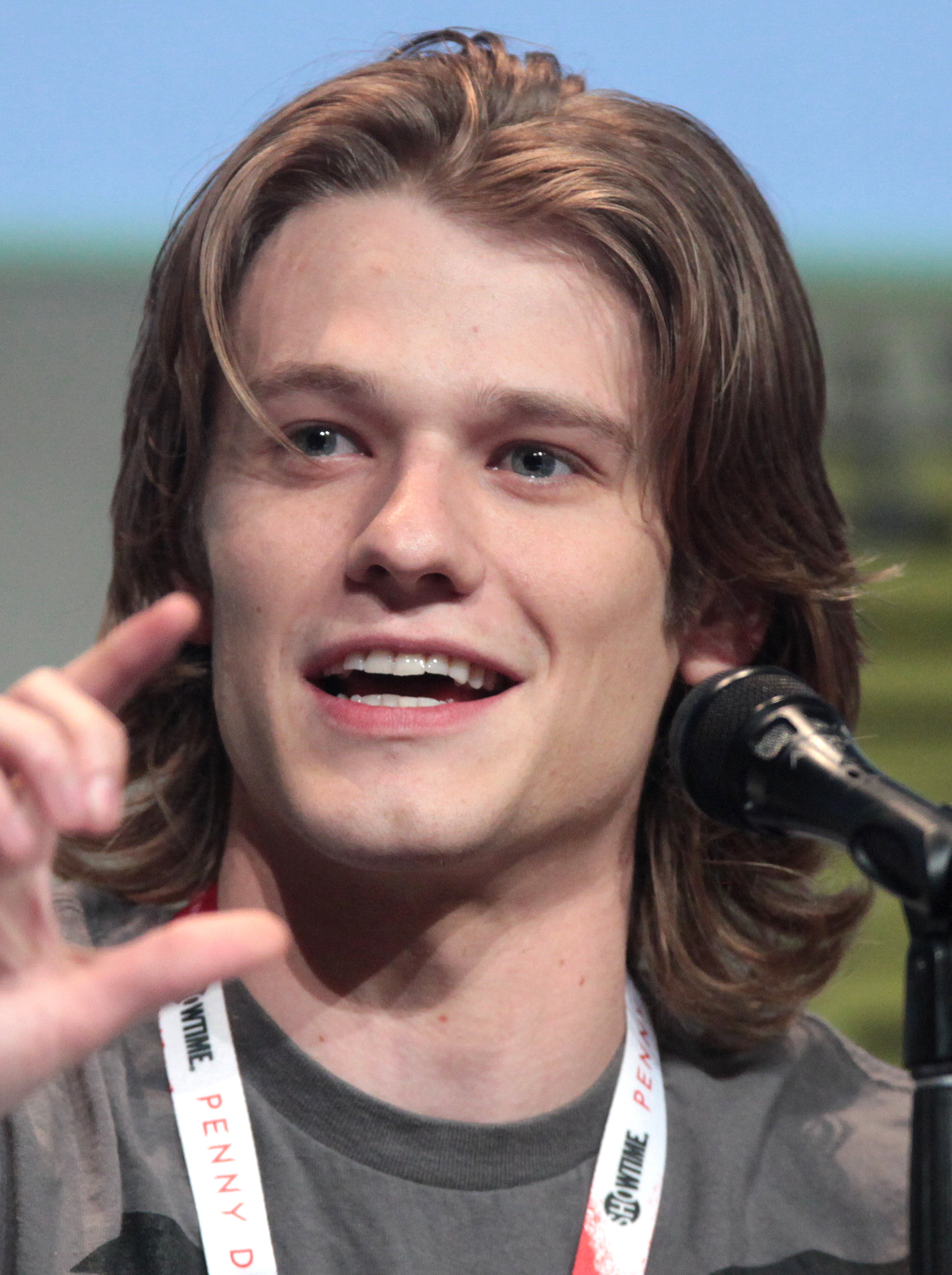
Lucas Till

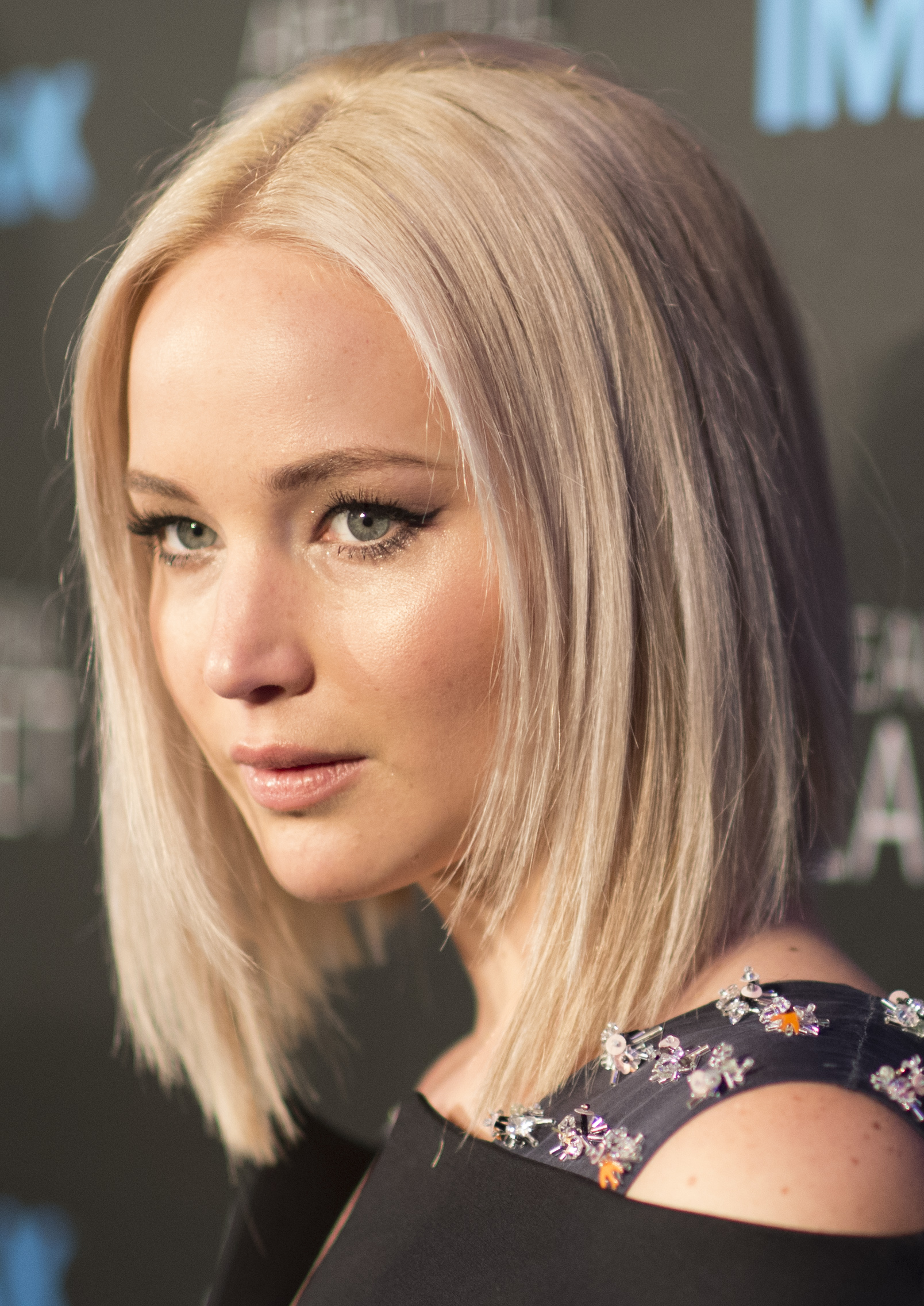
Jennifer Lawrence

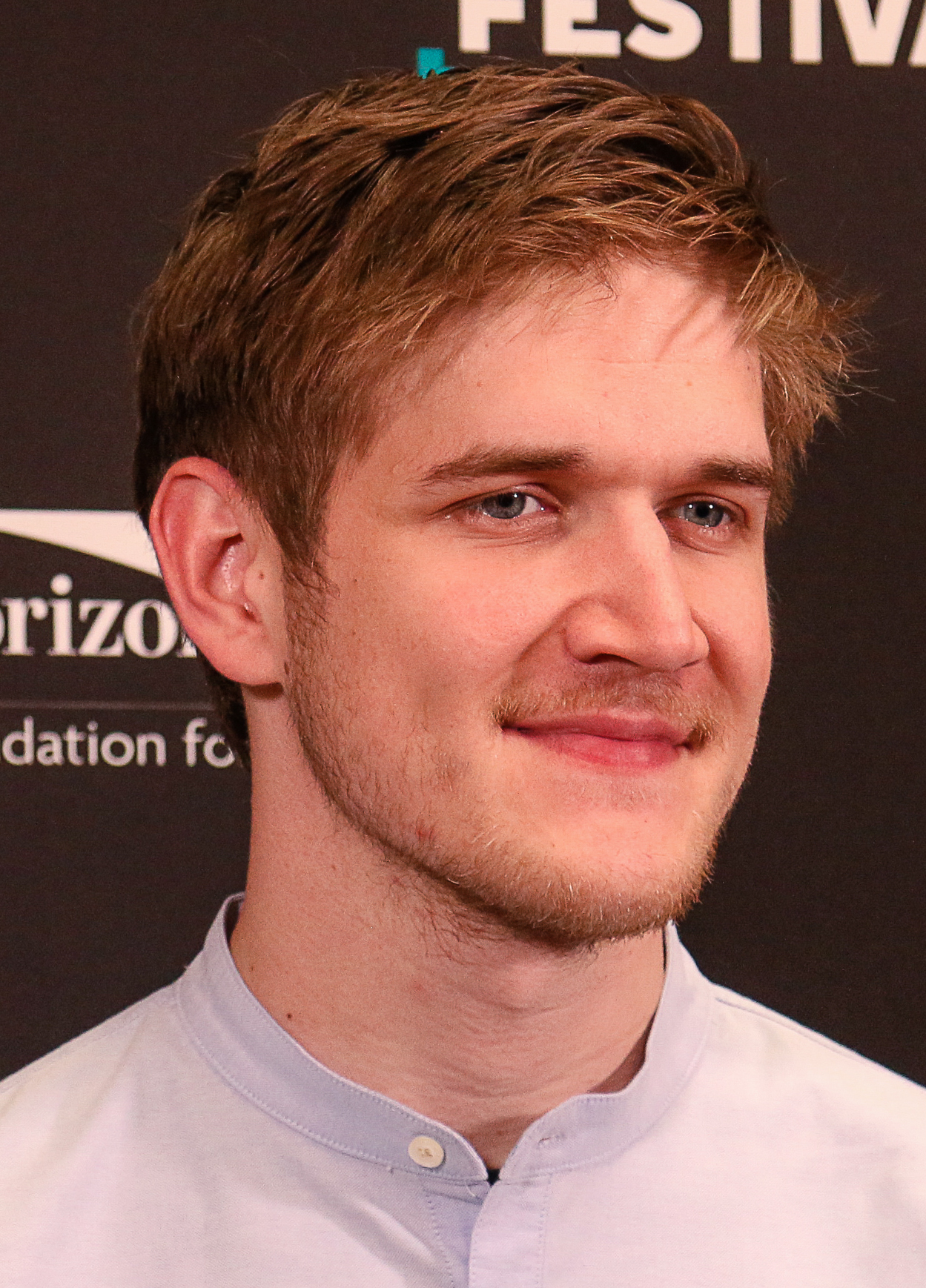
Bo Burnham

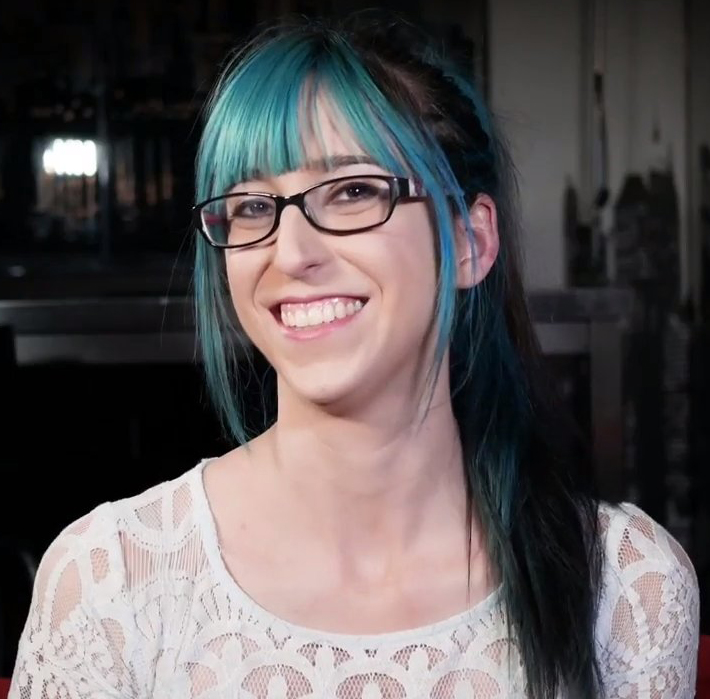
Erika Harlacher

- August 2
  - Marina Alex, golfer
  - Eddie Generazio, author and musician
  - Joe Seo, actor
- August 3 – Anthony Arena, soccer player
- August 5 – Patrick Reed, golfer
- August 6
  - Evelyn Ashenbrucker, rugby player
  - JonBenét Ramsey, beauty queen and murder victim (d. 1996)
- August 7 – Tate Forcier, football player
- August 8 – Tommy Bracco, actor, reality television star, and Broadway performer
- August 9
  - Denicos Allen, football player
  - Sarah McBride, politician
- August 10
  - Will Brittain, actor
  - Sydney Lemmon, actress
  - Lucas Till, actor
- August 13 – DeMarcus Cousins, basketball player
- August 14
  - Kiko Alonso, football player
  - Miranda Rae Mayo, actress
- August 15
  - Jennifer Lawrence, actress
  - Justin Pugh, football player
- August 17 – Janelle Adams, basketball player
- August 20 – Bradley Klahn, tennis player
- August 21 – Bo Burnham, comedian and musician
- August 22 – Adam Thielen, football player
- August 23
  - Wesley Singerman, guitarist, record producer and child actor
  - Mike Yastrzemski, baseball player
- August 24 – Jeffrey Vinokur, chemist and dancer
- August 25 – Max Muncy, baseball player
- August 26 – Eureka O'Hara, drag performer and television personality
- August 27
  - Tori Bowie, Olympic long jumper and runner (d. 2023)
  - Adam Metzger, musician, member of AJR
- August 29
  - Nicole Gale Anderson, actress
  - Erika Harlacher, voice actress

=== September ===
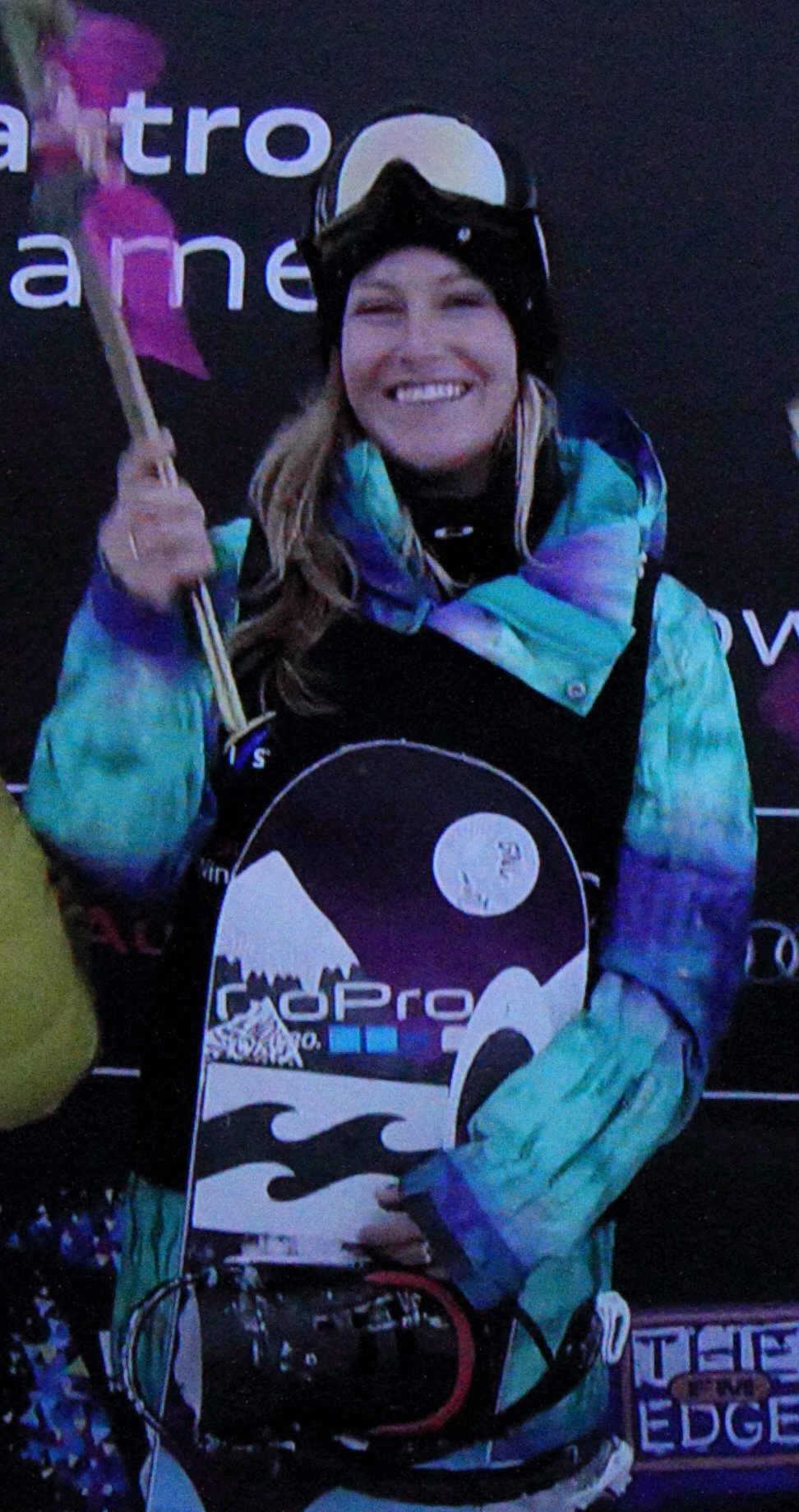
Jamie Anderson

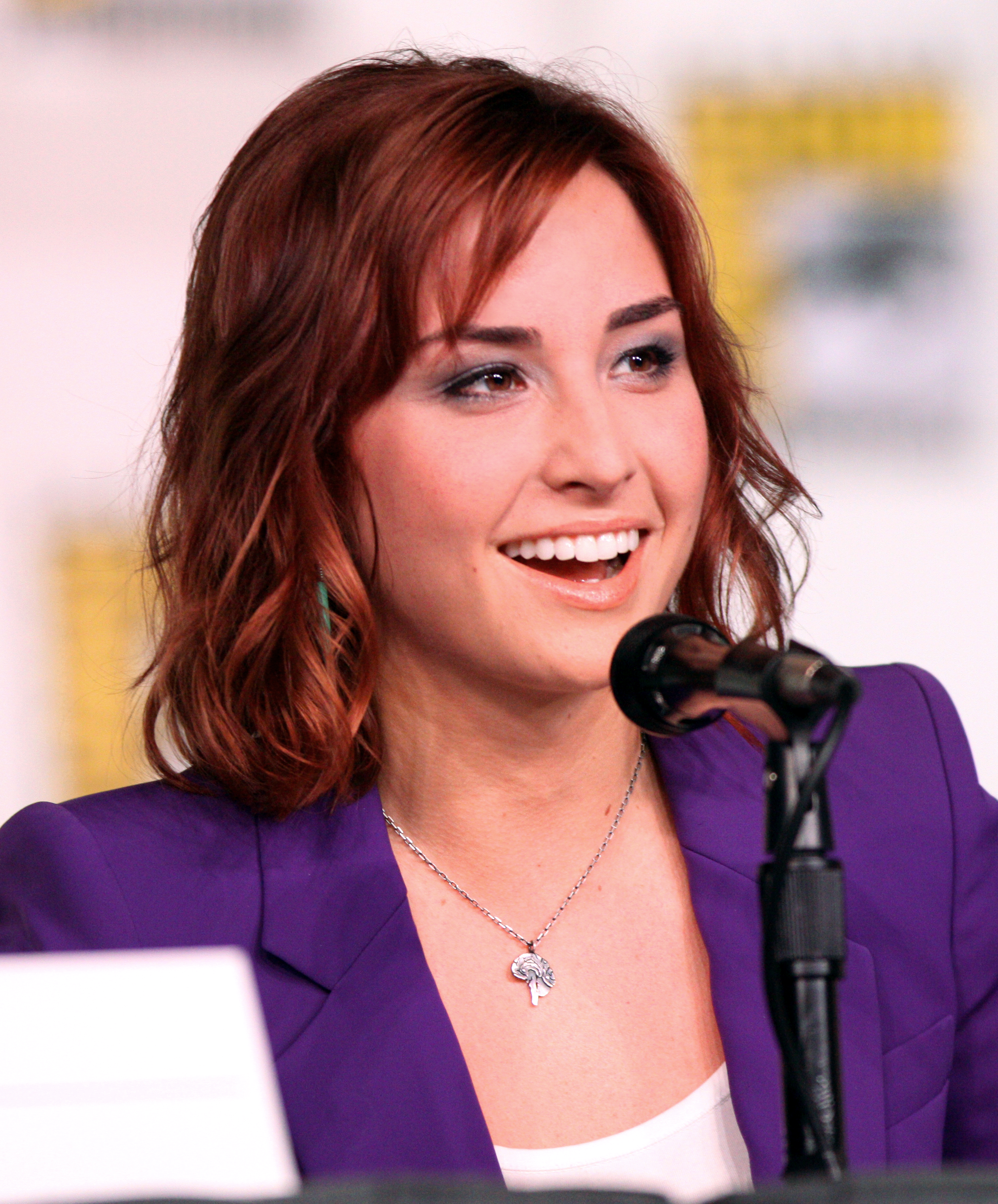
Allison Scagliotti

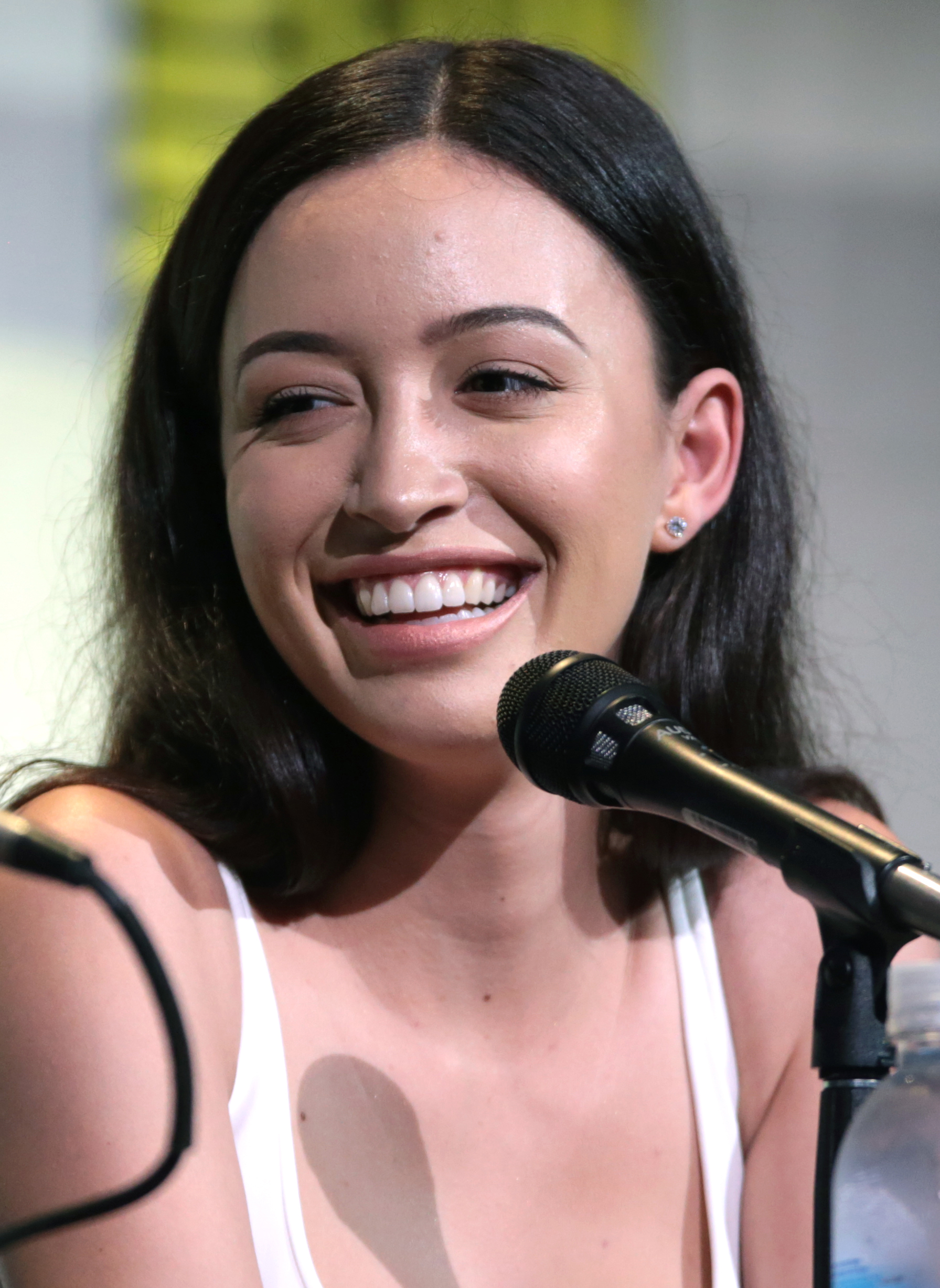
Christian Serratos

- September 1 – Christopher Agorsor, soccer player
- September 3 – Keaton Pierce, singer and frontman for Too Close to Touch (d. 2022)
- September 4
  - Tayshia Adams, television personality
  - Eric LeGrand, football player
- September 6
  - Matt McAndrew, singer/songwriter
  - John Wall, basketball player
- September 8
  - Matt Barkley, football player
  - Gerrit Cole, baseball player
  - Ella Rae Peck, actress
- September 9 – Haley Reinhart, singer
- September 10
  - Eddy Martin, actor
  - Chandler Massey, actor
- September 11 – Shawn Armstrong, baseball player
- September 12 – Tyler Acord, musician
- September 13
  - Jamie Anderson, Olympic snowboarder
  - HARDY, country singer/songwriter
- September 14 – Cody Anderson, baseball player
- September 15 – Matt Shively, actor
- September 19 – Patrick Breeding, singer
- September 20 – Phillip Phillips, singer
- September 21
  - Al-Farouq Aminu, basketball player
  - Cory Wade Hindorff, model, actor, singer/songwriter, Gay activist, and spokesperson
  - Allison Scagliotti, actress
  - Christian Serratos, actress
- September 27
  - C. J. Aiken, basketball player
  - Dion Lewis, football player
- September 28 – Jasper Dolphin, rapper, actor, and stunt performer
- September 29 – Doug Brochu, actor, comedian, and voice actor
- September 30
  - Alyssa Anderson, Olympic swimmer
  - Swerve Strickland, wrestler

=== October ===
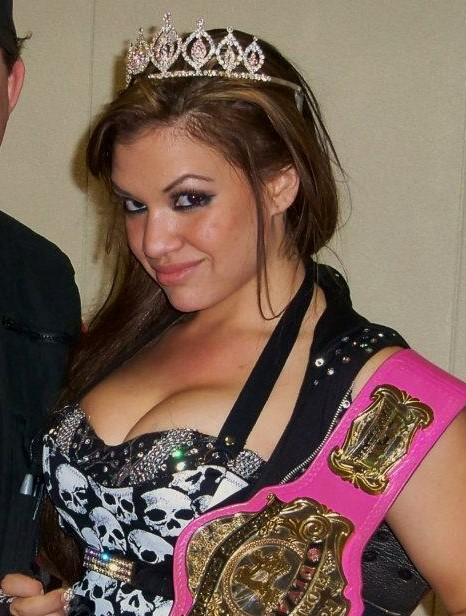
Shaul Guerrero

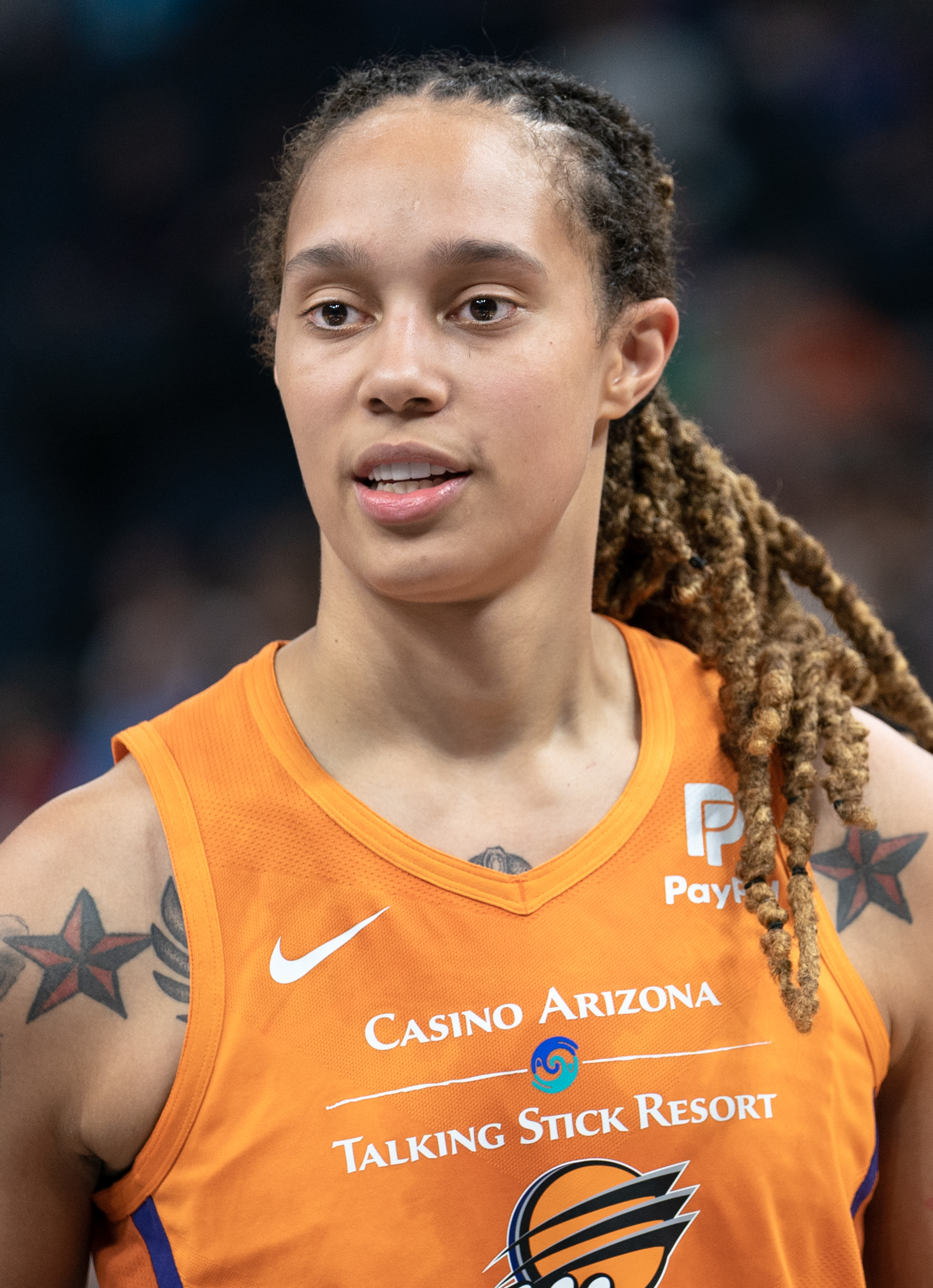
Brittney Griner

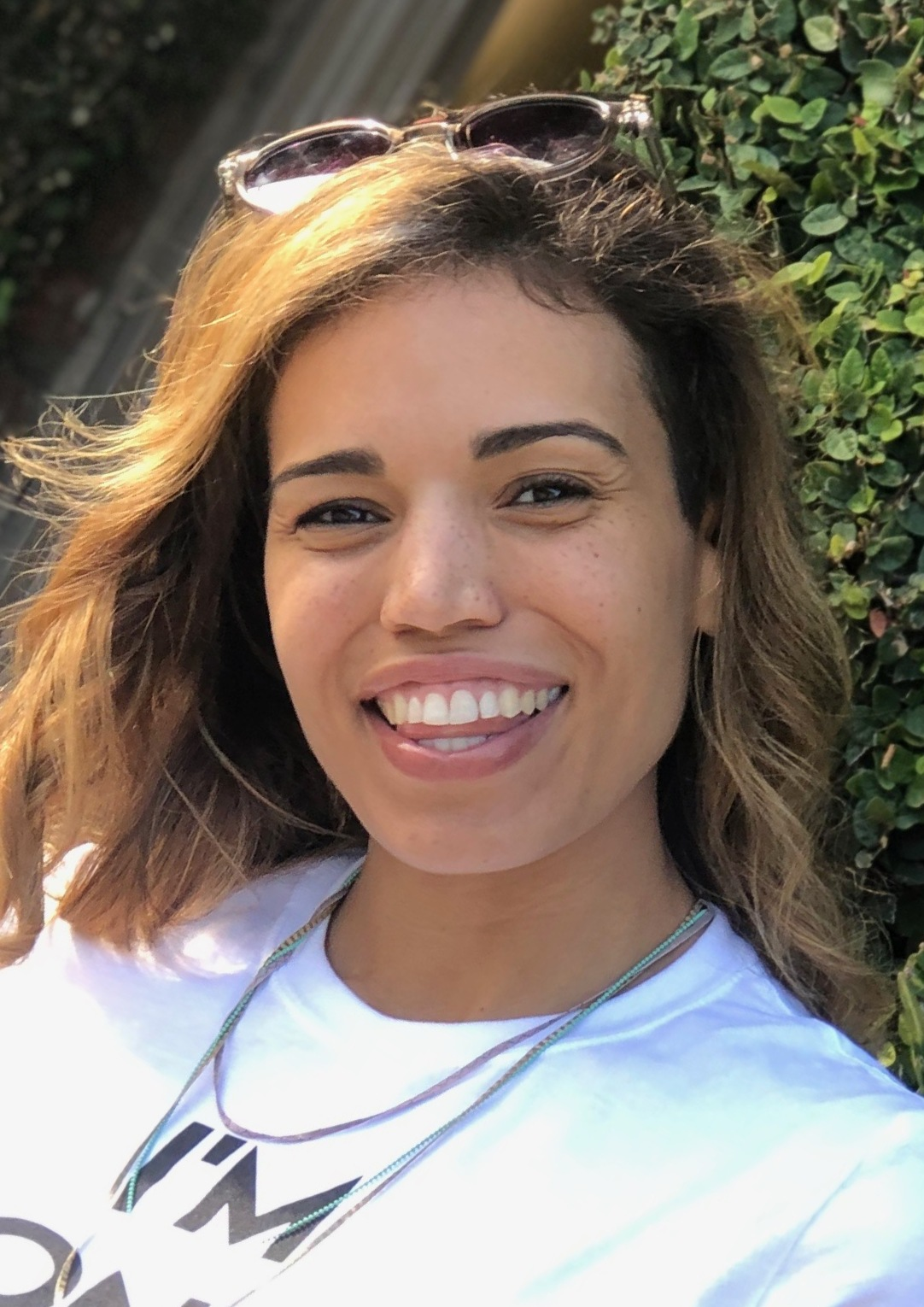
Ciara Renée

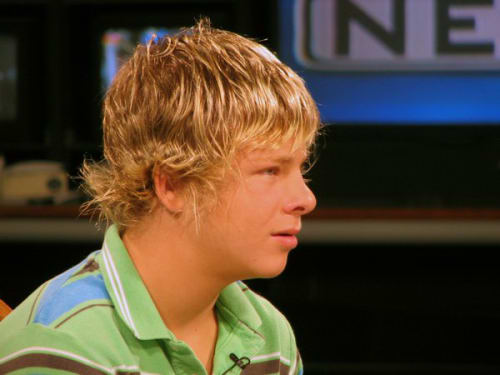
Jonathan Lipnicki

- October 1 – IDubbbz, YouTuber
- October 2
  - Brent Adams, lacrosse player
  - Barbi Hayden, wrestler
- October 4 – Rich Homie Quan, rapper (d. 2024)
- October 5 – Alex Boniello, actor, musician, author, and producer
- October 6
  - Quincy Acy, basketball player
  - Jordan Hamilton, basketball player
- October 7 – Ayla Kell, actress
- October 8 – Trent Harmon, singer
- October 12 – Brock Coyle, football player
- October 13 – Bailey Noble, actress
- October 14 – Shaul Guerrero, wrestler
- October 17
  - Alvester Alexander, football player
  - Dalya Attar, politician
  - Dora Madison Burge, actress
- October 18
  - Brittney Griner, basketball player
  - Carly Schroeder, actress
- October 19
  - Jessica Meuse, singer
  - Samantha Munro, actress
  - Ciara Renée, actress
- October 20
  - Galadriel Stineman, actress
  - Andrew Watt, record producer
- October 22
  - Ashley Fiolek, motocross racer
  - Jonathan Lipnicki, actor
- October 23
  - Gabriel Acevero, Trinidadian-born politician
  - Stevie Brock, singer
- October 24 – Kirby Bliss Blanton, actress
- October 25
  - Austin Peralta, jazz musician and composer
  - Ryan Preece, racing driver
- October 29 – Carlson Young, actress
- October 30 – George Abud, actor, playwright, and musician
- October 31
  - JID, rapper
  - Lil' JJ, actor and comedian

=== November ===
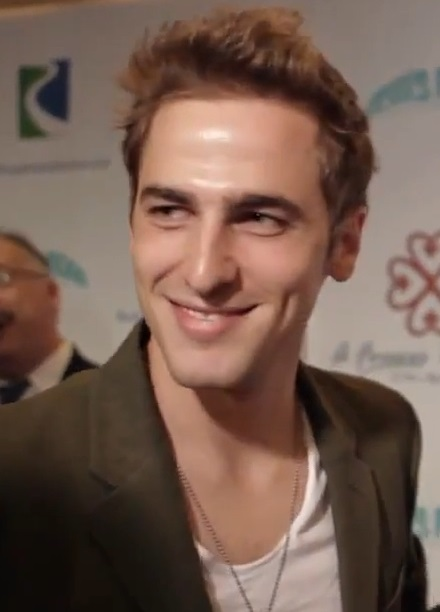
Kendall Schmidt

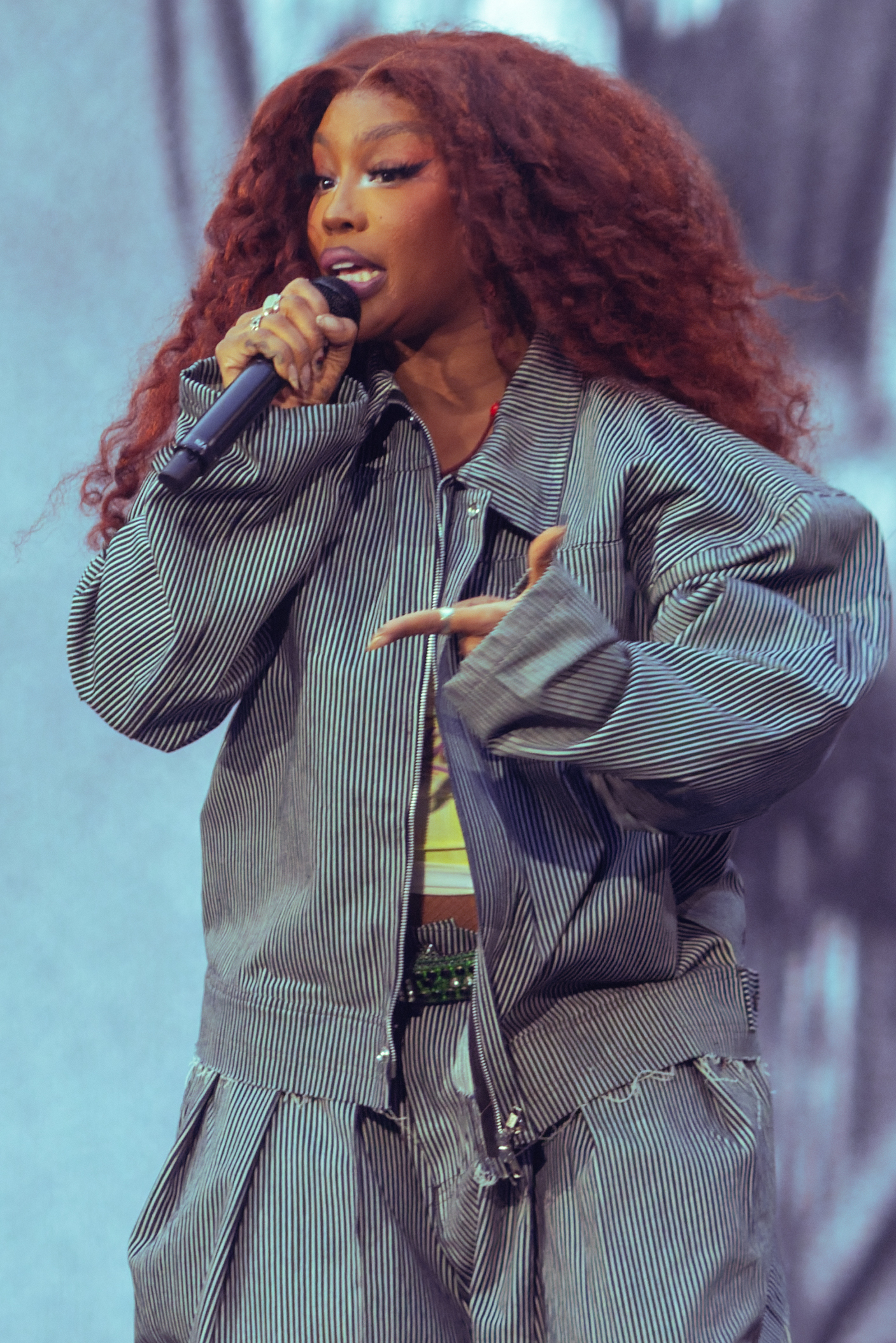
SZA

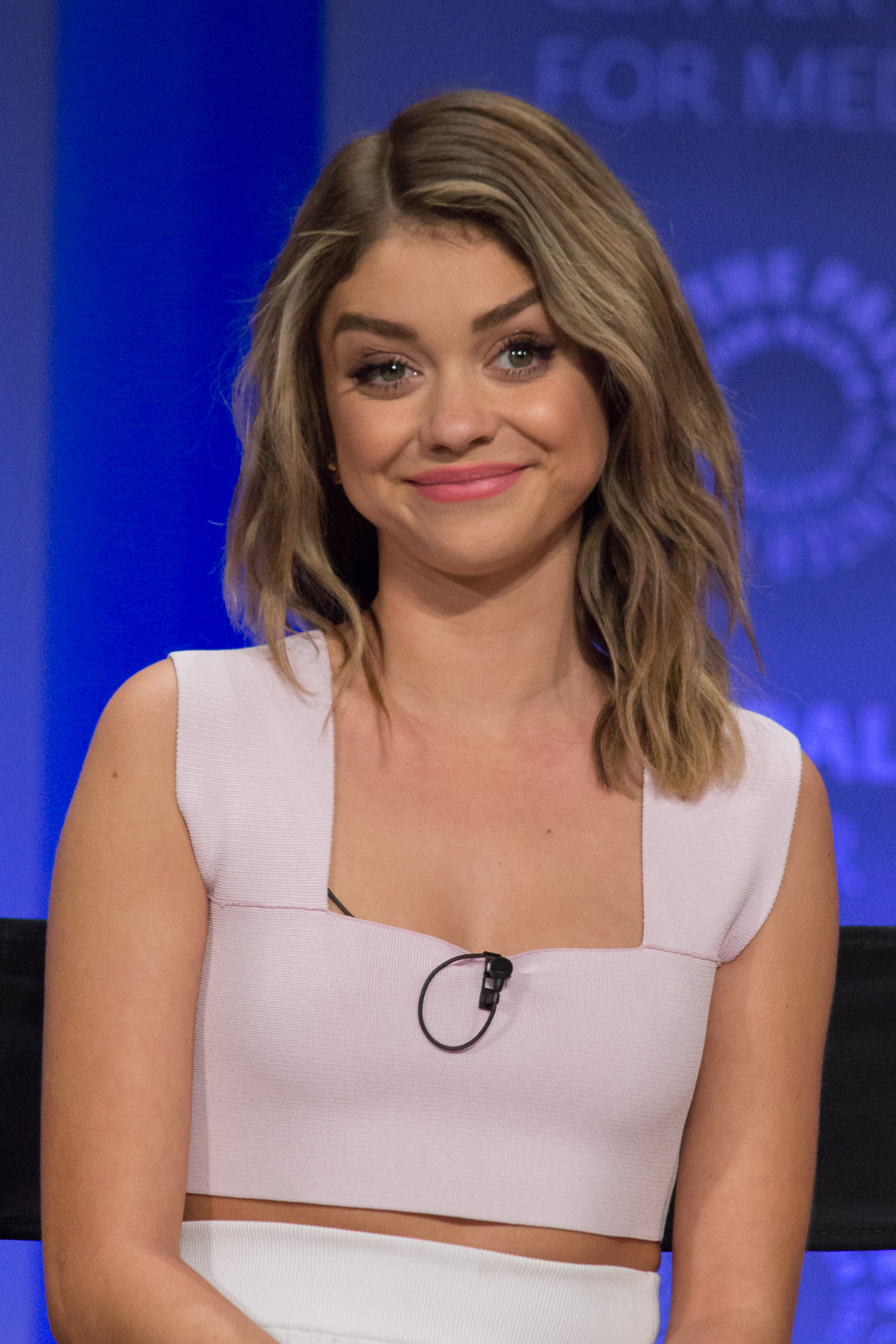
Sarah Hyland

- November 2 – Kendall Schmidt, actor, singer, and guitarist
- November 6 – Bowen Yang, Australian-born actor, comedian, writer, and podcaster
- November 7 – Courtney Marie Andrews, singer/songwriter
- November 8 – SZA, R&B singer
- November 9
  - Hodgy, rapper
  - Christine Michael, football player
- November 10
  - Emmanuel Acho, football player
  - David Arnold, basketball player
  - Aron Jóhannsson, soccer player
- November 11 – Bilqis Abdul-Qaadir, basketball player
- November 12
  - Carlos Alvarez, soccer player and coach
  - Adrianna Franch, soccer player
- November 13 – Kathleen Herles, voice actress
- November 14 – DJ Suede the Remix God, musician
- November 17 – Shanica Knowles, actress and singer
- November 18 – Carly Aquilino, comedian, actress, television host, and television personality
- November 19
  - Brittany Altomare, golfer
  - Nick Andries, racing driver
- November 20 – Zack Martin, football player
- November 21 – Nickmercs, livestreamer
- November 22 – Brock Osweiler, football player
- November 23 – Nick Williams, football player
- November 24 – Sarah Hyland, actress
- November 25
  - Stephanie Hsu, actress
  - Rye Rye, rapper, dancer, and actress
- November 27 – Blackbear, hip hop musician, singer, composer, and record producer
- November 28 – Sena Acolatse, ice hockey player
- November 29 – Sheldon Richardson, football player

=== December ===
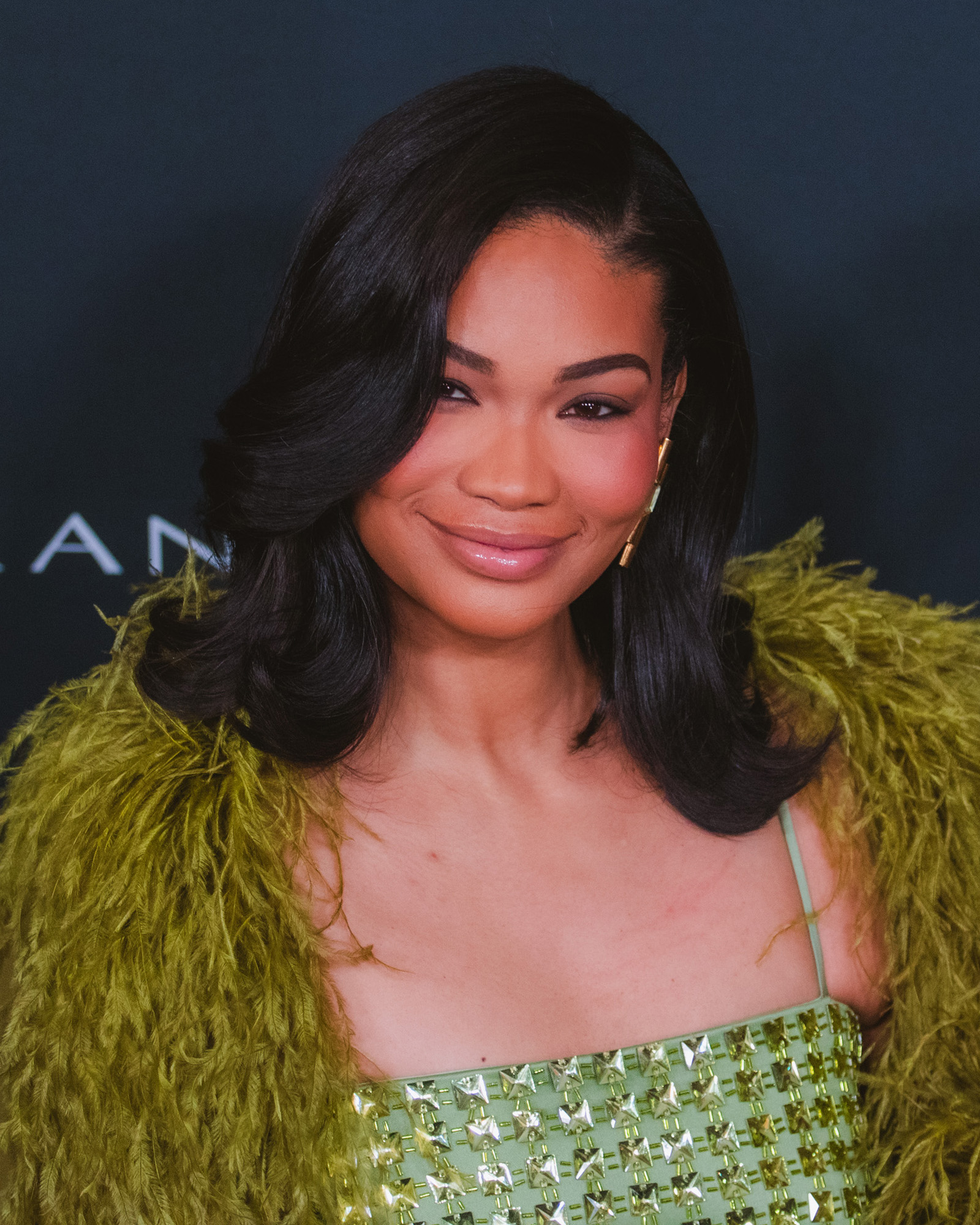
Chanel Iman

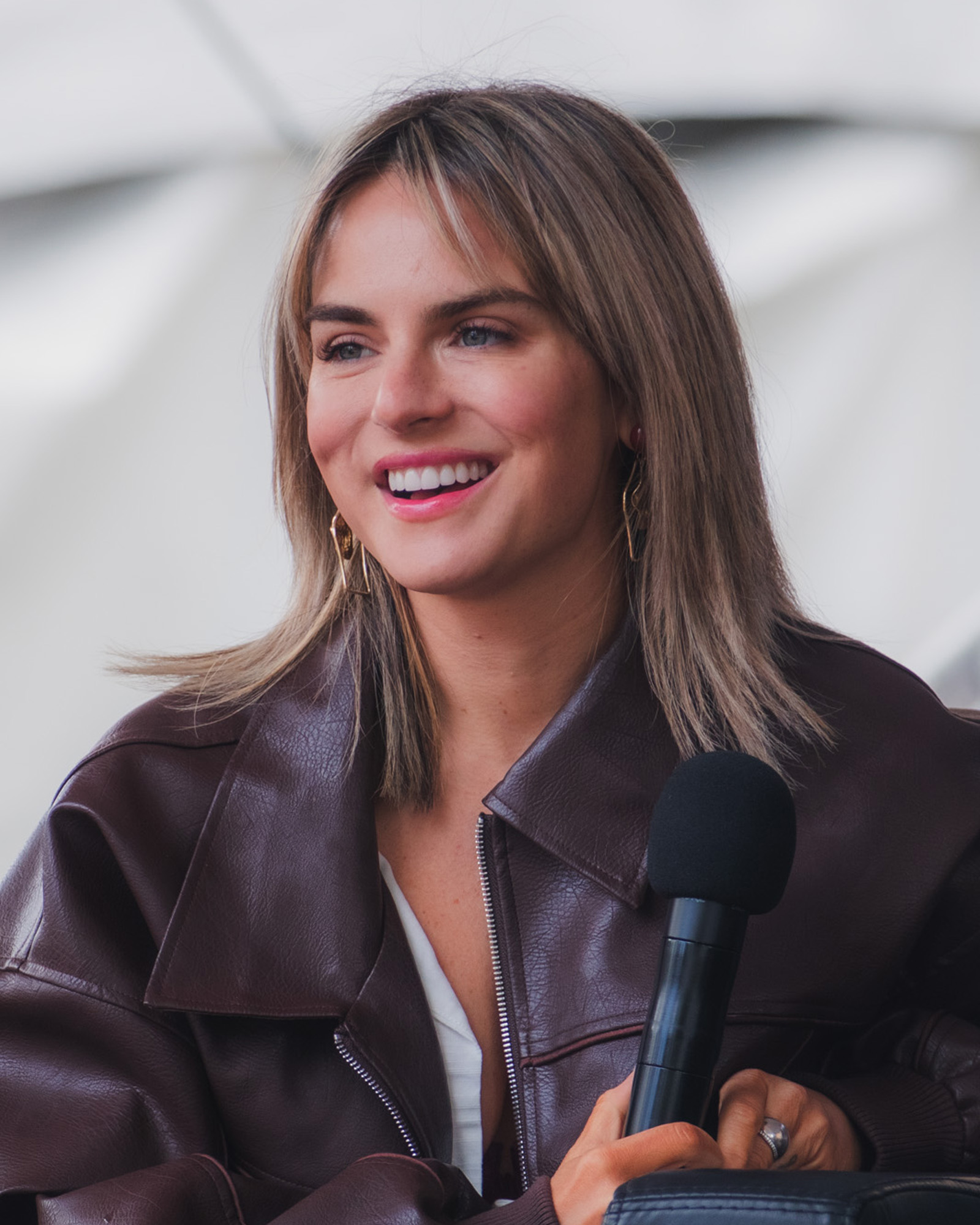
JoJo

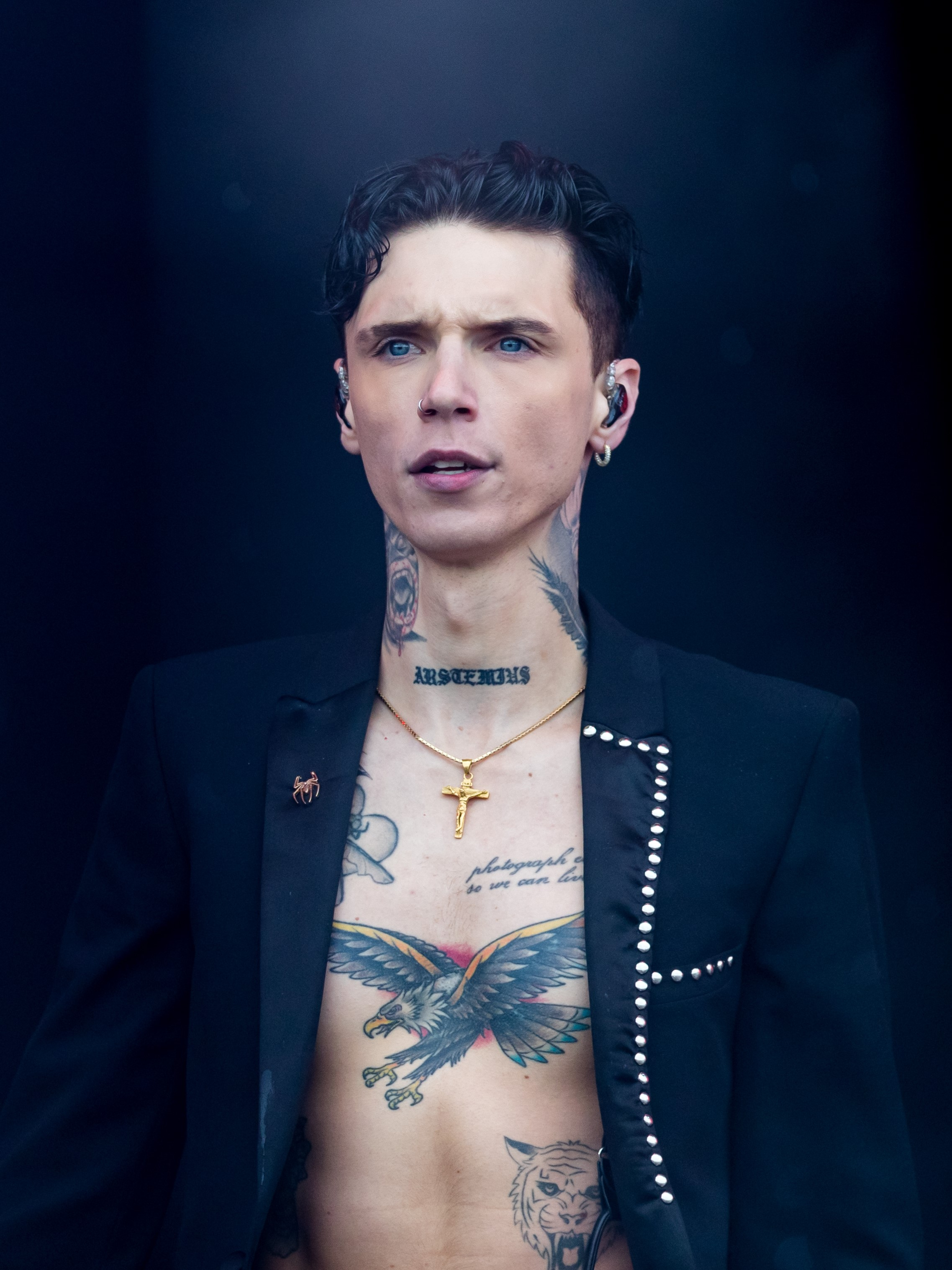
Andy Biersack

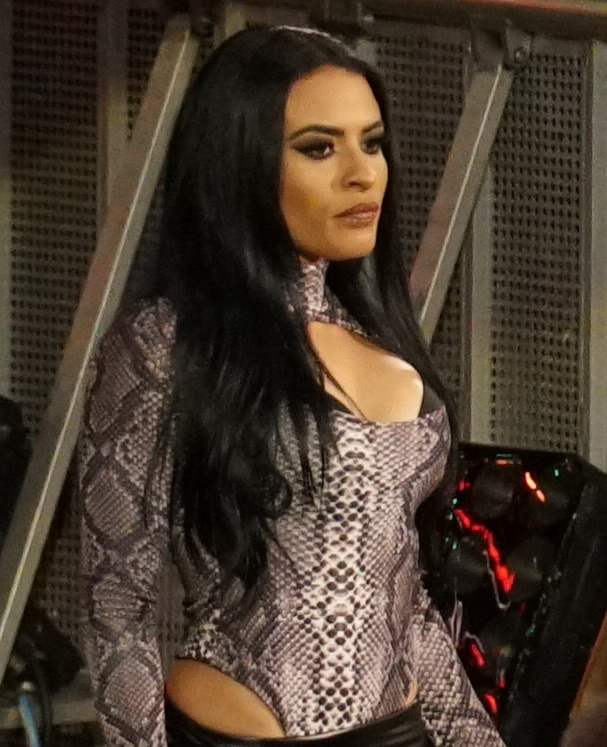
Zelina Vega

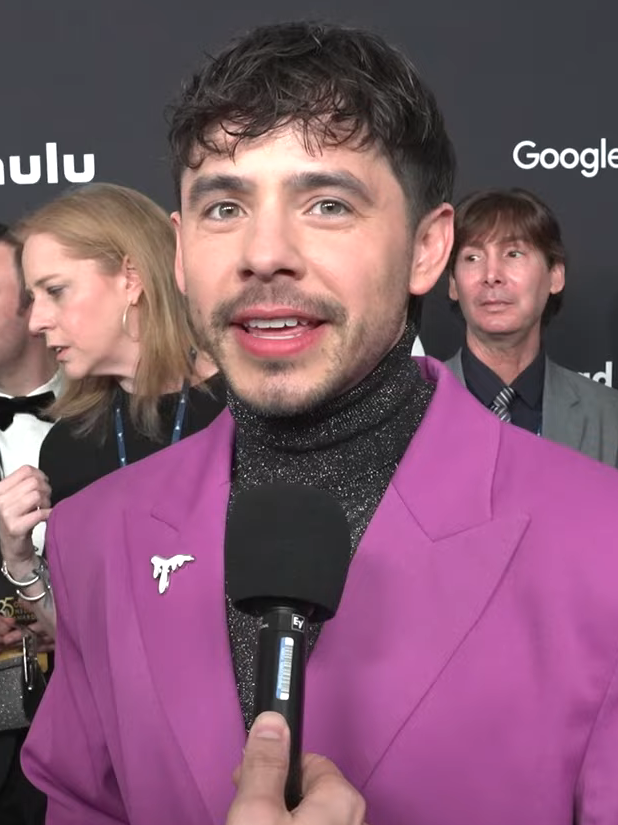
David Archuleta

- December 1
  - 24hrs, rapper
  - Chanel Iman, model
- December 4 – Matt Amodio, game show contestant and winner
- December 6
  - Rene Aranda, actress and singer
  - Elizabeth Bruenig, journalist
- December 7 – Kwame Alexander, basketball player
- December 9 – Shondel Archer, American-born Guyanese footballer
- December 10 – Terrell Sinkfield, football player
- December 11 – Derrick Nix, basketball player
- December 13
  - Matt Atkins, golfer
  - Cody Calafiore, television personality
- December 17
  - Jared Abbrederis, football player
  - Graham Rogers, actor
- December 18 – Sierra Kay, singer/songwriter, model, and lead vocalist for VersaEmerge
- December 20
  - JoJo, singer and actress
  - Trainwreckstv, Twitch streamer
- December 22 – Josef Newgarden, race car driver
- December 23 – Anna Maria Perez de Tagle, actress
- December 24 – Marcus Jordan, basketball player
- December 26
  - Jon Bellion, singer
  - Andy Biersack, singer/songwriter and frontman for Black Veil Brides
  - Illenium, musician, DJ, music producer, and songwriter
- December 27 – Zelina Vega, wrestler and actress
- December 28
  - David Archuleta, singer
  - Isaiah Armwood, basketball player

=== Full date unknown ===
- Alexander Aciman, writer and journalist
- Abbie Adams, artist
- Nick Allen, politician
- Asmongold, Internet personality
- Justin Bonitz, singer/songwriter and frontman for Tallah

== Deaths ==
=== January ===
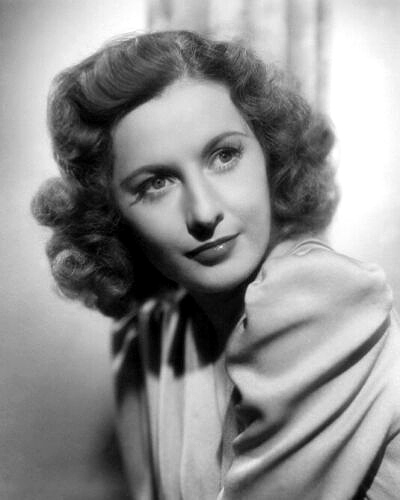
Barbara Stanwyck

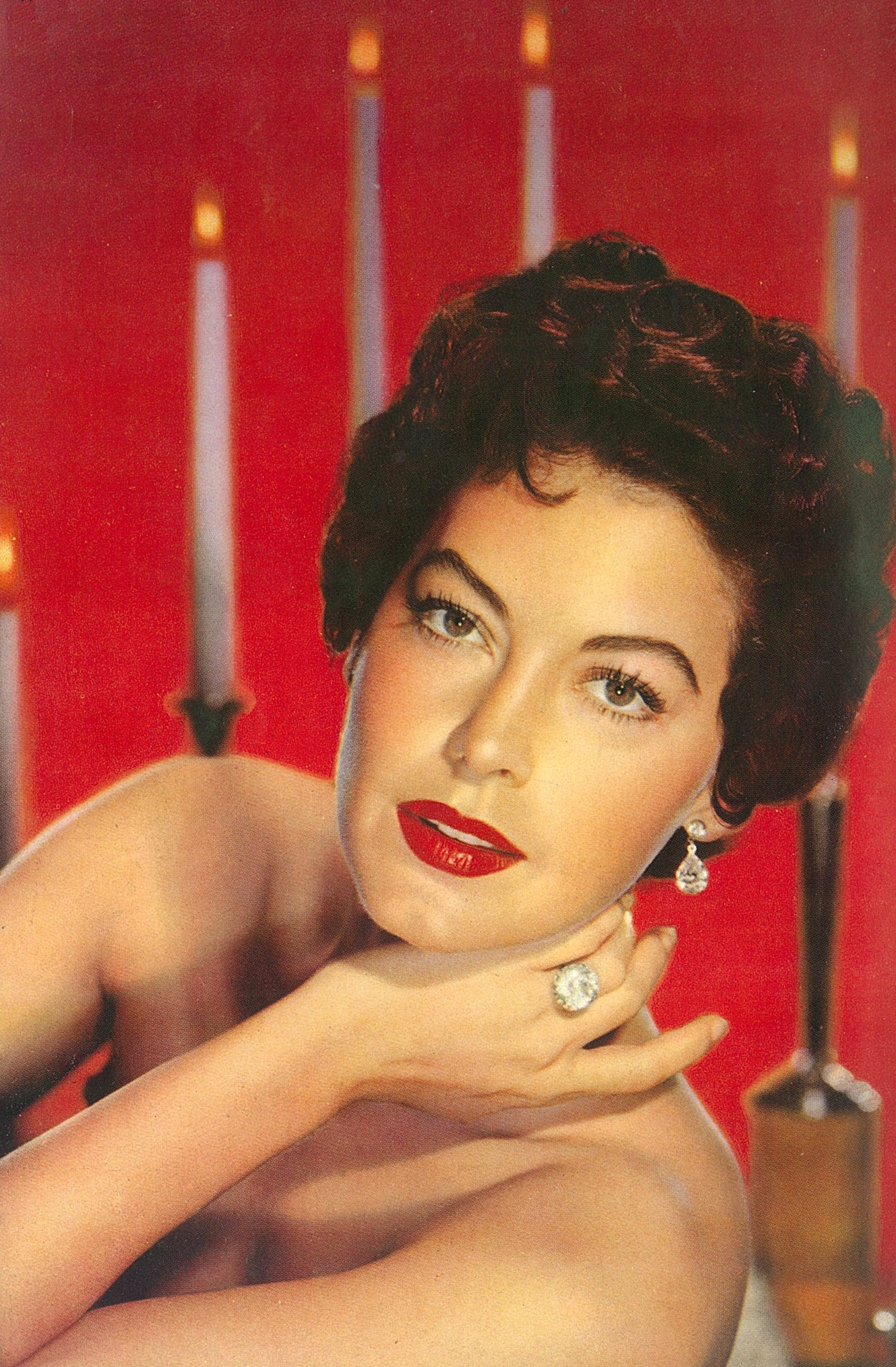
Ava Gardner

- January 2 – Alan Hale Jr., American actor (b. 1921)
- January 4 – Doc Edgerton, American electrical engineer (b. 1903)
- January 5 – Arthur Kennedy, American actor (b. 1914)
- January 7 – Bronko Nagurski, Canadian-American football player (b. 1908)
- January 9
  - Northern Calloway, American actor (b. 1948)
  - Spud Chandler, American baseball player (b. 1907)
- January 10 – Lyle R. Wheeler, American art director (b. 1905)
- January 18
  - Rusty Hamer, American actor (b. 1948)
  - Edouard Izac, American naval officer (b. 1891)
- January 19 – Arthur Goldberg, Supreme Court justice (b. 1908)
- January 20 – Barbara Stanwyck, American actress (b. 1907)
- January 22 – Roman Vishniac, Russian-American photographer (b. 1897)
- January 23 – Allen Collins, American musician (b. 1952)
- January 24 – Madge Bellamy, American actress (b. 1899)
- January 25 – Ava Gardner, American actress (b. 1922)
- January 26 – Lewis Mumford, American historian of science (b. 1895)
- January 27 – Helen Jerome Eddy, American actress (b. 1897)
- January 28 – Joseph Payne Brennan, American writer (b. 1918)
- January 30 – John Rogers Cox, American painter (b. 1915)

=== February ===
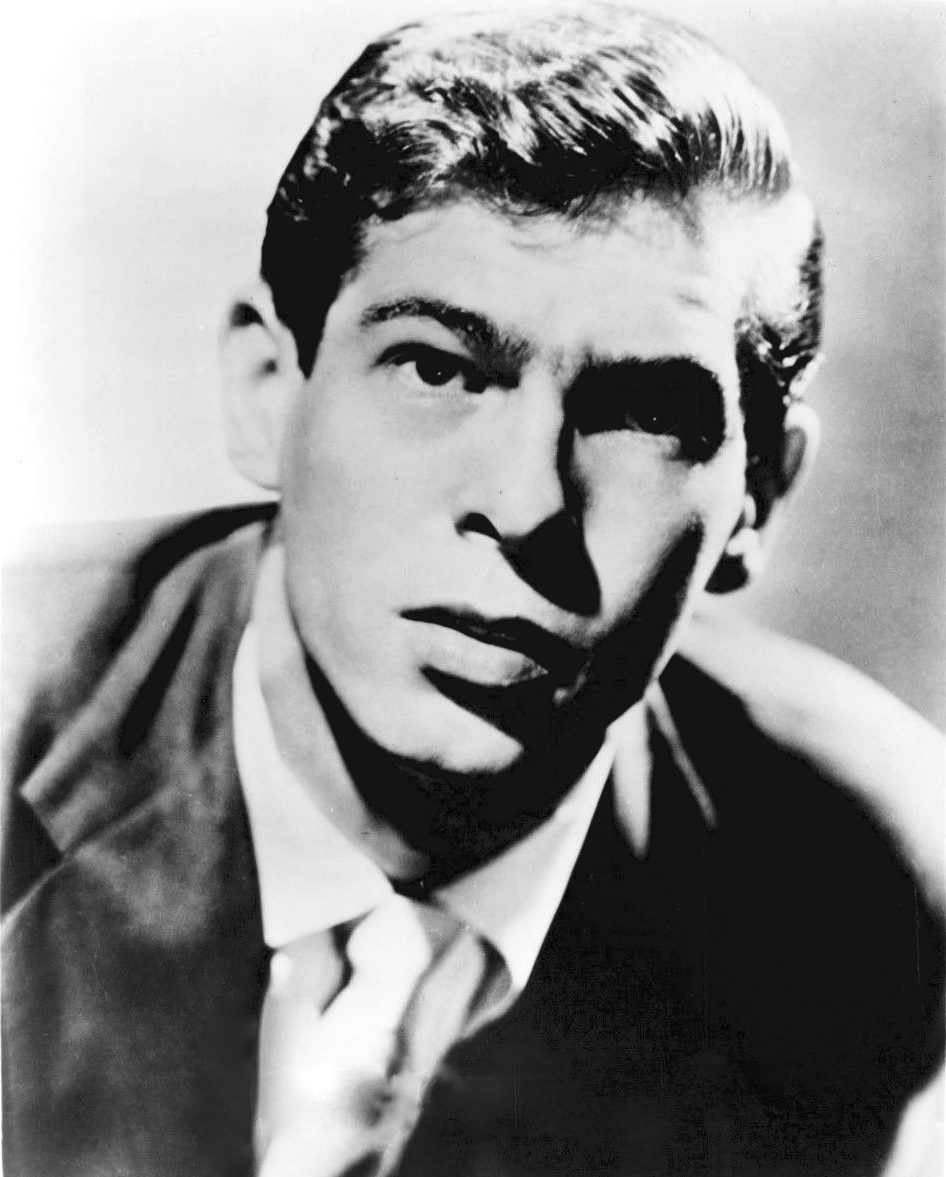
Johnnie Ray

- February 2 – Mel Lewis, American jazz musician (b. 1929)
- February 3 – Jane Novak, American actress (b. 1896)
- February 5 – Joseph J. Nazzaro, Air Force general (b. 1913)
- February 7
  - Nazarena of Jesus, American Roman Catholic nun and missionary (b. 1907)
  - Jimmy Van Heusen, American composer (b. 1913)
- February 8 – Del Shannon, American musician and singer (b. 1934)
- February 9 – Una Hanbury, British born sculptor (b. 1904)
- February 10 – Bill Sherwood, American musician and director (b. 1952)
- February 13
  - Angela Gregory, American sculptor and professor of art (b. 1903)
  - Ken Lynch, American actor (b. 1910)
- February 14 – Jean Wallace, American actress (b. 1923)
- February 15 – Henry Brandon, German Born actor (b. 1912)
- February 16 – Keith Haring, American pop artist (b. 1958)
- February 17 – Erik Rhodes, American actor (b. 1906)
- February 19 – Otto E. Neugebauer, Austrian-born American mathematician and historian of science (b. 1899)
- February 22 – Stephen W. Burns, American actor (b. 1954)
- February 23 – James M. Gavin, American army general (b. 1907)
- February 24
  - Tony Conigliaro, American baseball player (b. 1945)
  - Malcolm Forbes, American publisher (b. 1919)
  - Johnnie Ray, American singer (b. 1927)
- February 27 – Nahum Norbert Glatzer, American scholar (b. 1903)
- February 28 – Cornell Gunter, American singer (b. 1936)

=== March ===
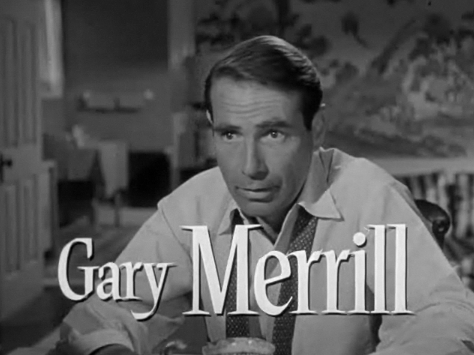
Gary Merrill

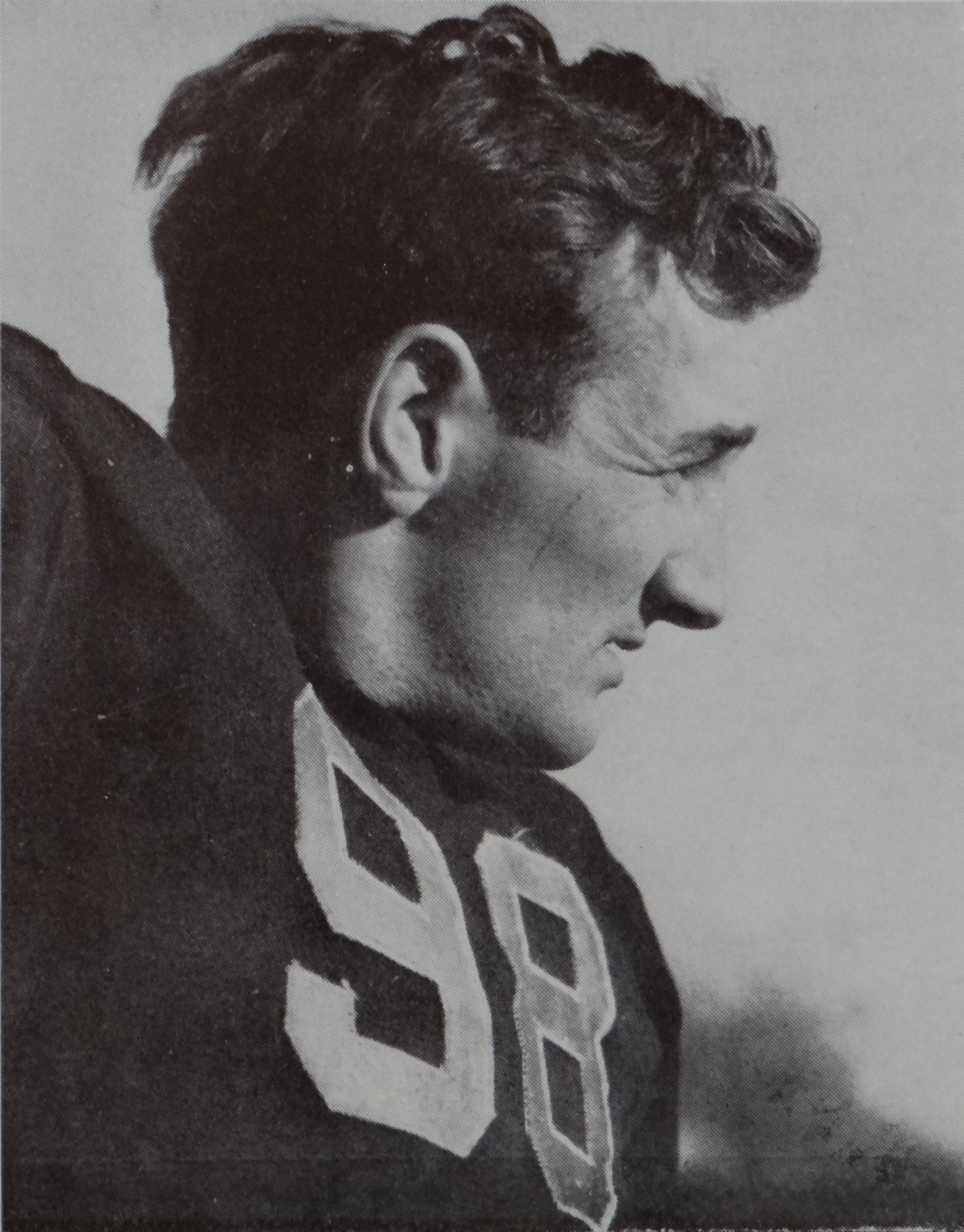
Tom Harmon

- March 4 – Hank Gathers, American basketball player (b. 1967)
- March 5 – Gary Merrill, American actor (b. 1915)
- March 6
  - William Raborn, American Navy officer (b. 1905)
  - Joe Sewell, American baseball player (b. 1898)
- March 12 – Gene Klein, American businessman (b. 1921)
- March 13 – Bruno Bettelheim, American child psychologist (b. 1903)
- March 14 – Harold Medina, American lawyer, teacher, and judge (b. 1888)
- March 15 – Tom Harmon, American football player and broadcaster (b. 1919)
- March 18 – Robin Harris, American actor, comedian and voice artist (b. 1953)
- March 19
  - Neta Lohnes Frazier, American children's author (b. 1890)
  - Andrew Wood, American musician (b. 1966)
- March 24 – Ray Goulding, American comedian (b. 1922)
- March 26 – Halston, American fashion designer (b. 1932)
- March 30 – Harry Bridges, Australian-born union leader (b. 1901)

=== April ===
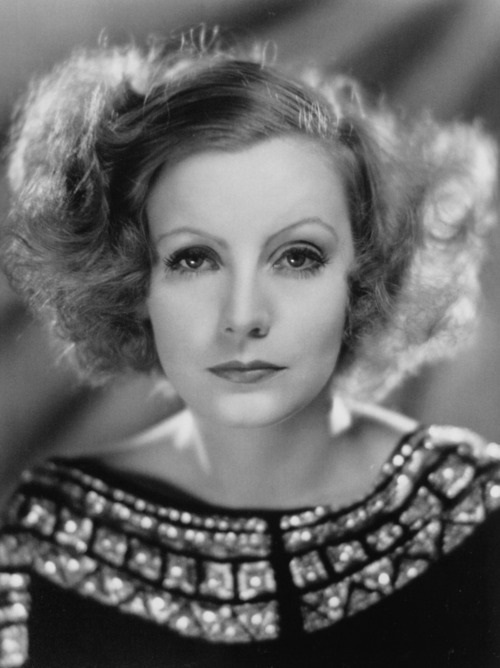
Greta Garbo

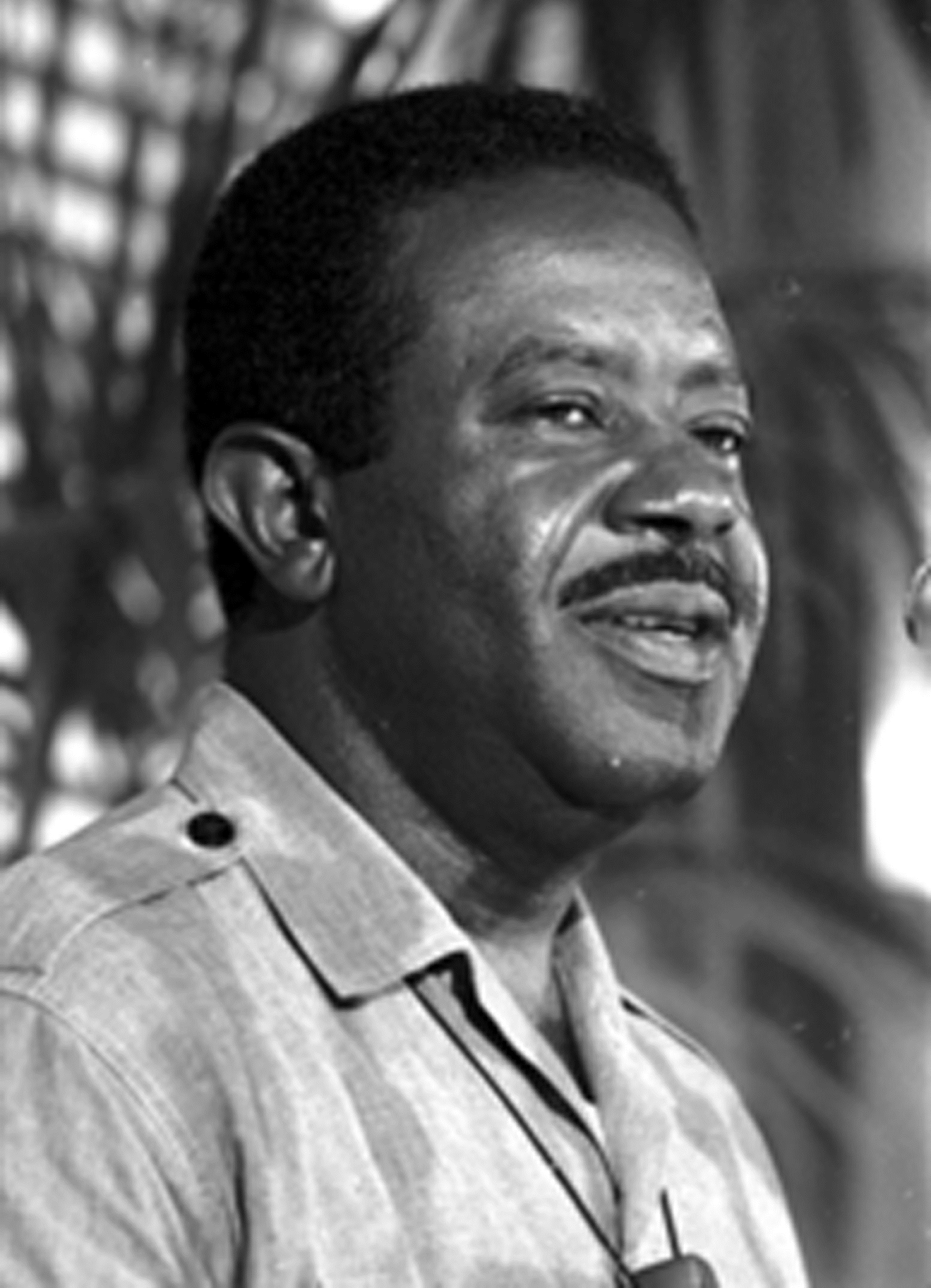
Ralph Abernathy

- April 3
  - Edna Reindel, Surrealist and American Regionalist painter and sculptor (b. 1894)
  - Sarah Vaughan, American jazz vocalist (b. 1924)
- April 7 – Ronald Evans, American astronaut (b. 1933)
- April 8 – Ryan White, American AIDS activist (b. 1971)
- April 10 – Fortune Gordien, American Olympic athlete (b. 1922)
- April 15 – Greta Garbo, Swedish-born actress (b. 1905)
- April 17 – Ralph Abernathy, American civil rights activist (b. 1926)
  - Charles E. Sheedy, Catholic priest and professor dies in South Bend, Indiana (b. 1912)
- April 18
  - Gory Guerrero, American wrestler and father of Eddie Guerrero (b. 1921)
  - Robert D. Webb, American film director (b. 1903)
- April 22 – Albert Salmi, American actor (b. 1928)
- April 23 – Paulette Goddard, American actress (b. 1910)
- April 25 – Dexter Gordon, American jazz saxophonist (b. 1923)
- April 27 – Bella Spewack, American songwriter (b. 1899)
- April 30 – Joseph E. Johnson, American government official (b. 1895)

=== May ===
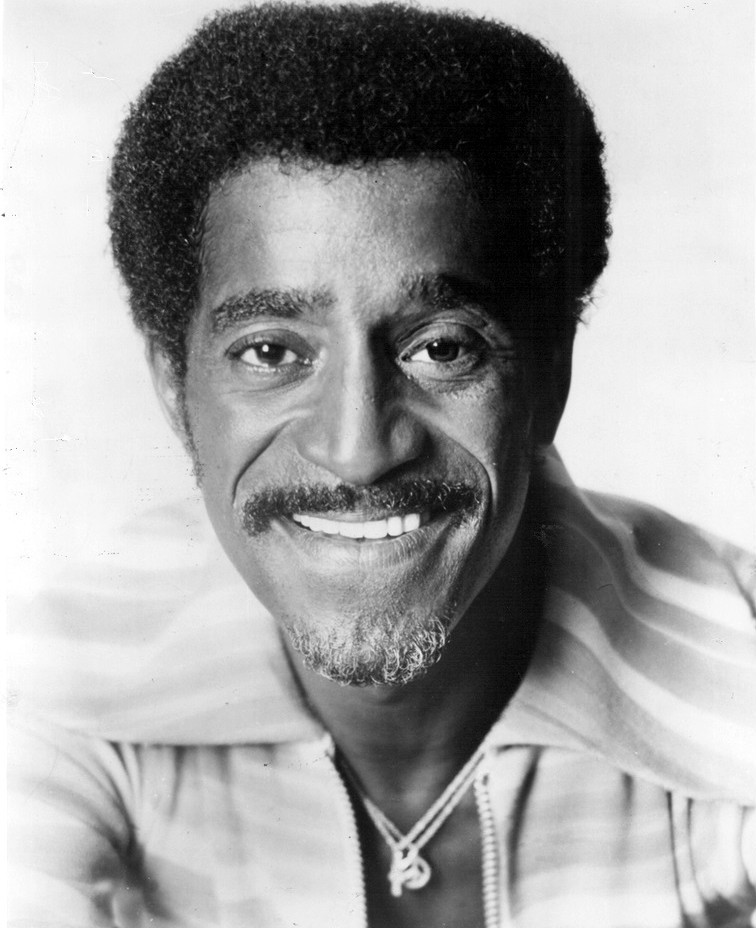
Sammy Davis Jr.

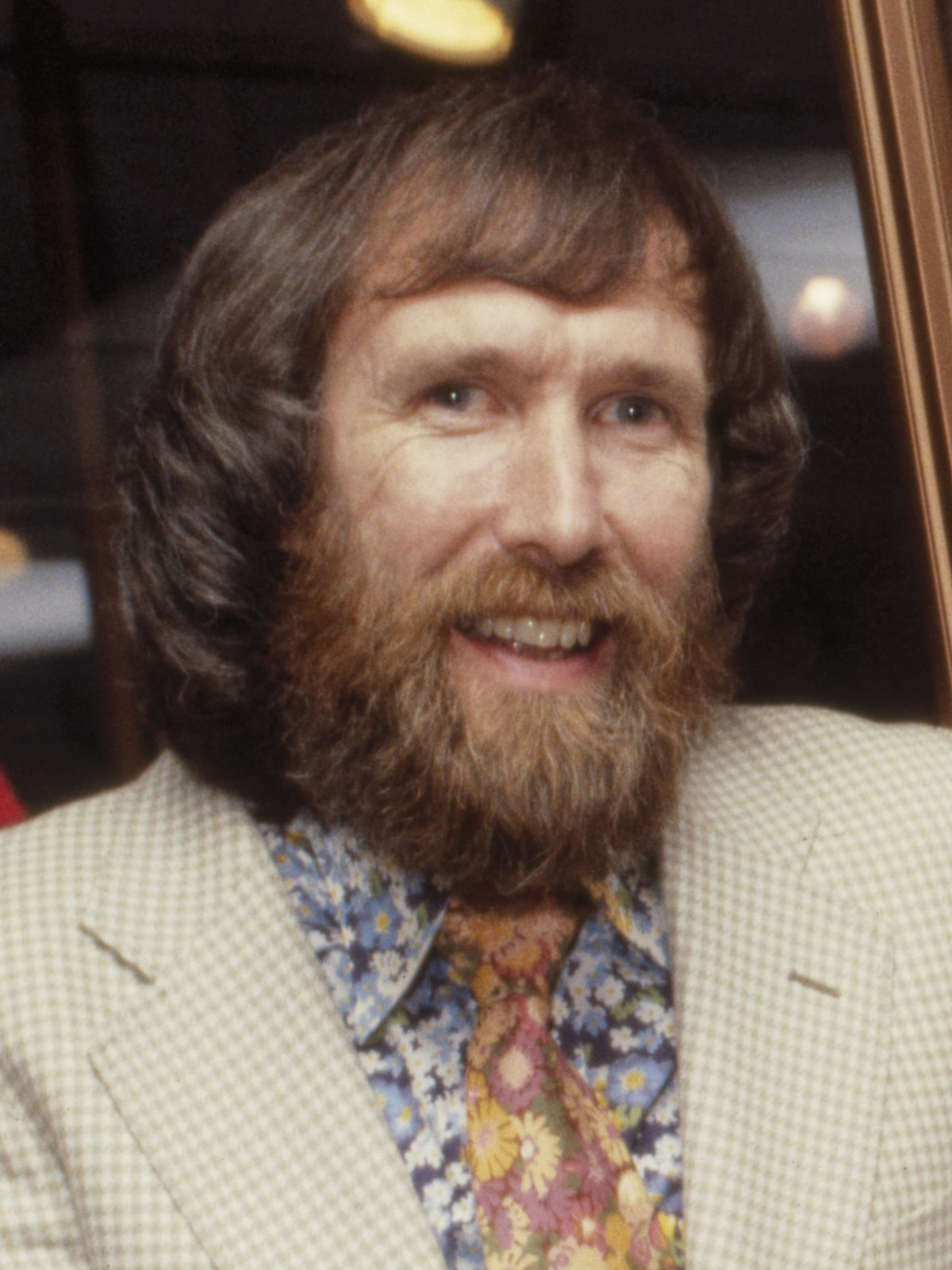
Jim Henson

- May 1 – Sunset Carson, American actor (b. 1920)
- May 2
  - William L. Dawson, American composer, choir director, and professor (b. 1899)
  - David Rappaport, American actor (b. 1951)
- May 5 – Cecilia H. Hauge, American nurse (b. 1905)
- May 6 – Charles Farrell, American actor (b. 1900)
- May 9 – Pauline Frederick, American journalist (b. 1908)
- May 10
  - Susan Oliver, American actress (b. 1932)
  - Walker Percy, American writer (b. 1916)
- May 14 – Franklyn Seales, American actor (b. 1952)
- May 16
  - Sammy Davis Jr., American actor, dancer, and singer (b. 1925)
  - Jim Henson, American puppeteer and filmmaker (b. 1936)
- May 18 – Jill Ireland, English actress (b. 1936)
- May 22 – Rocky Graziano, American boxer (b. 1919)
- May 23 – Charlie Keller, American baseball player (b. 1916)
- May 25 – Vic Tayback, American actor (b. 1930)
- May 30 – Ora Mendelsohn Rosen, biomedical researcher (b. 1935)

=== June ===
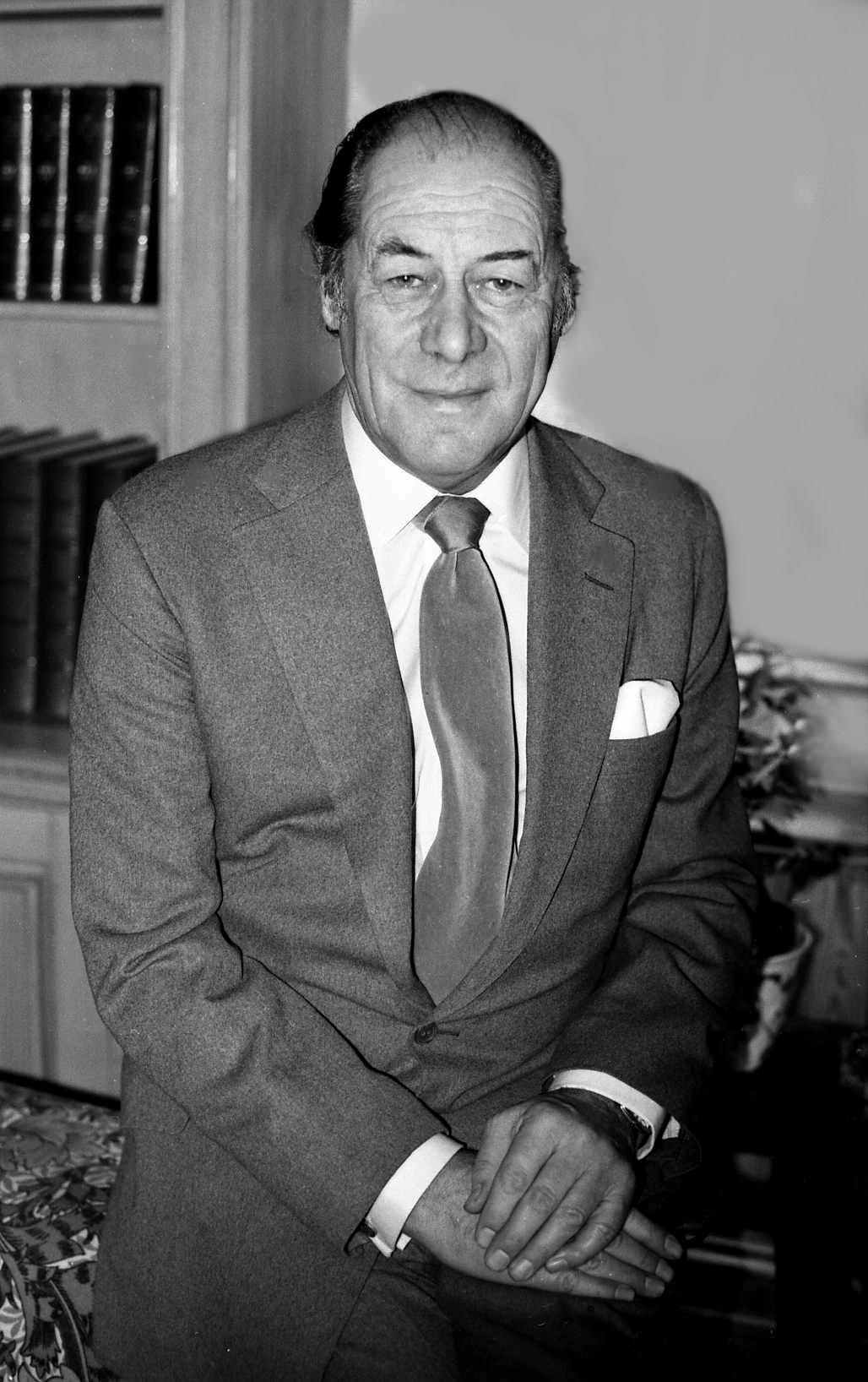
Rex Harrison

- June 2 – Rex Harrison, English actor (b. 1908)
- June 3 – Robert Noyce, American businessman and inventor (b. 1927)
- June 4
  - Stiv Bators, singer (The Dead Boys) (b. 1949)
  - Jack Gilford, American actor (b. 1908)
- June 7 – Barbara Baxley, American actress (b. 1923)
- June 11 – Clyde McCoy, American jazz trumpeter (b. 1903)
- June 12 – Laura Scales, American educator (b. 1879)
- June 14 – Philip Henry Bridenbaugh, American football player and coach (b. 1890)
- June 20 – Ina Balin, American actress (b. 1937)
- June 22 – Mollie Moon, American civil rights activist (b. 1912)
- June 27 – William Edward Davies, American geologist and speleologist (b. 1917)
- June 29 – Irving Wallace, American writer (b. 1916)

=== July ===
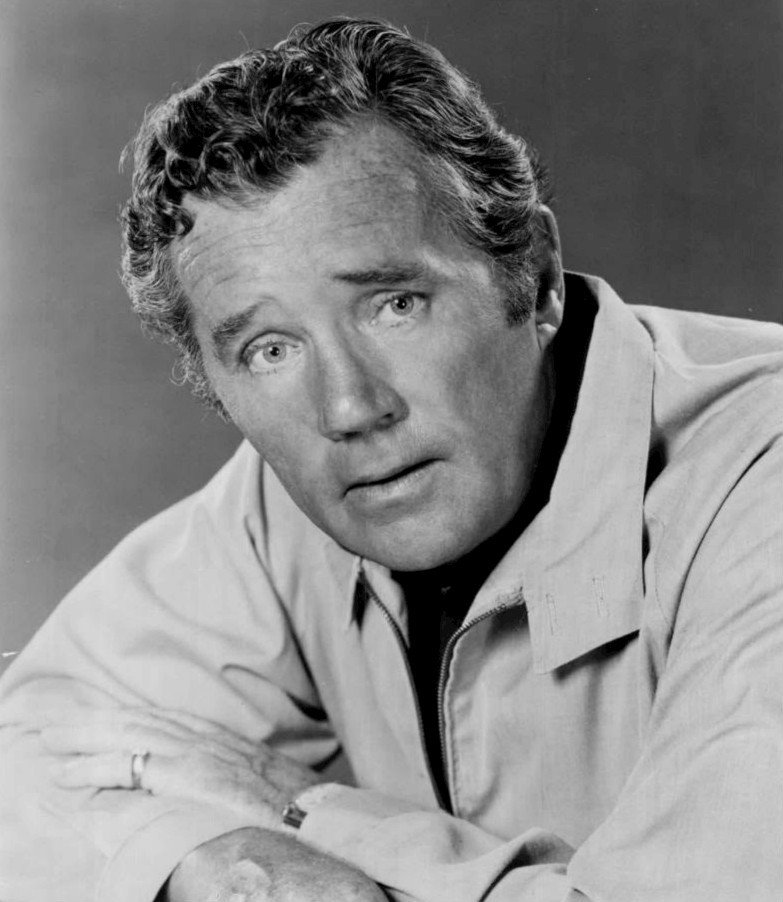
Howard Duff

- July 4 – Phil Boggs, American Olympic diver (b. 1949)
- July 7 – Bill Cullen, American game show host (b. 1920)
- July 8 – Howard Duff, American actor (b. 1913)
- July 13 – Lois Moran, American actress (b. 1909)
- July 15 – Trouble T Roy, American hip-hop dancer (b. 1967)
- July 18 – Karl Menninger, American psychiatrist (b. 1893)
- July 19 – Eddie Quillan, American actor (b. 1907)
- July 21 – Joe Turner, American jazz pianist (b. 1907)
- July 26 – Brent Mydland, American keyboard player (b. 1952)
- July 27 – Bobby Day, American singer-songwriter and producer (b. 1928)
- July 28 – Red Barrett, American baseball player (b. 1915)

=== August ===
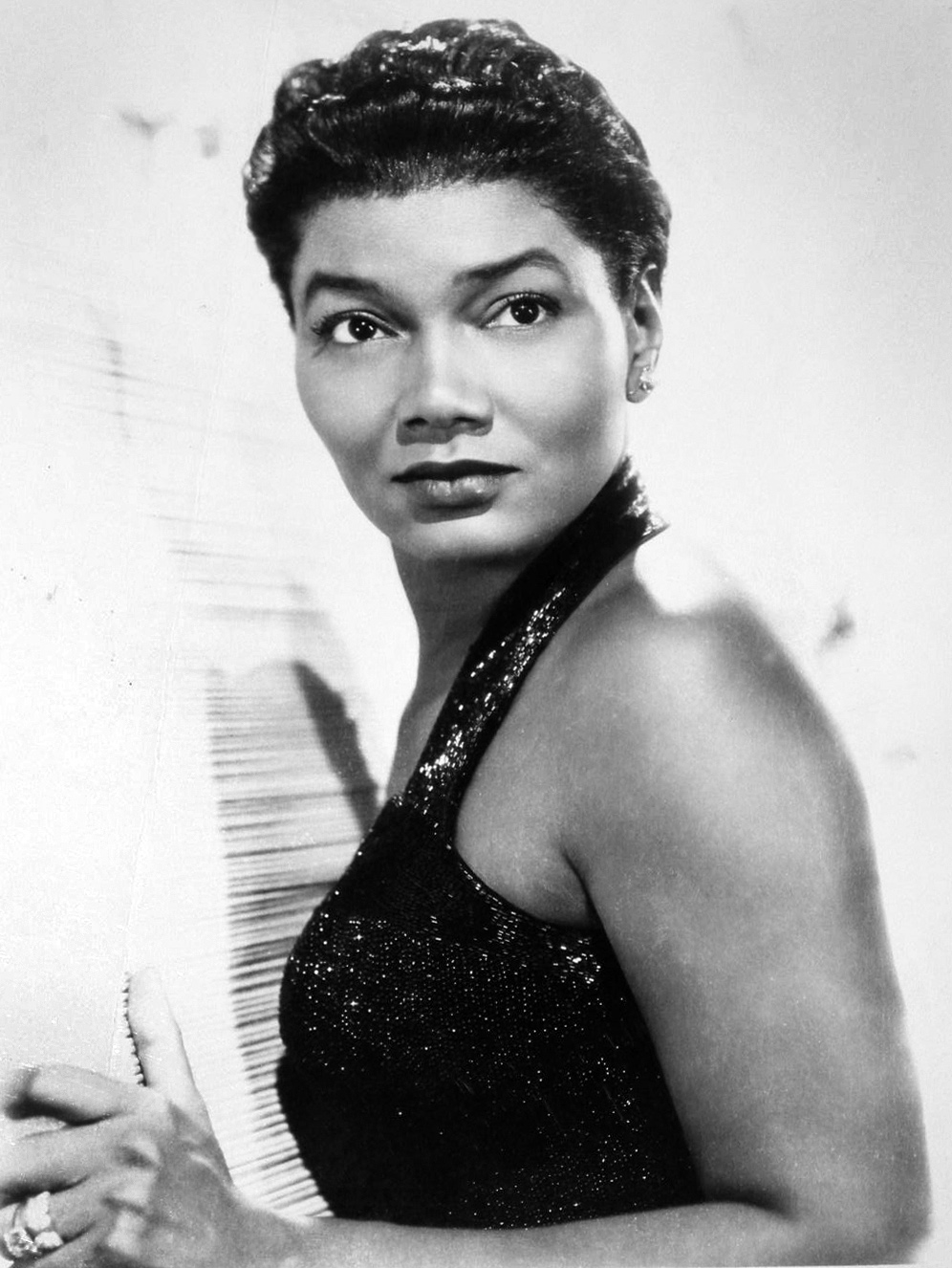
Pearl Bailey

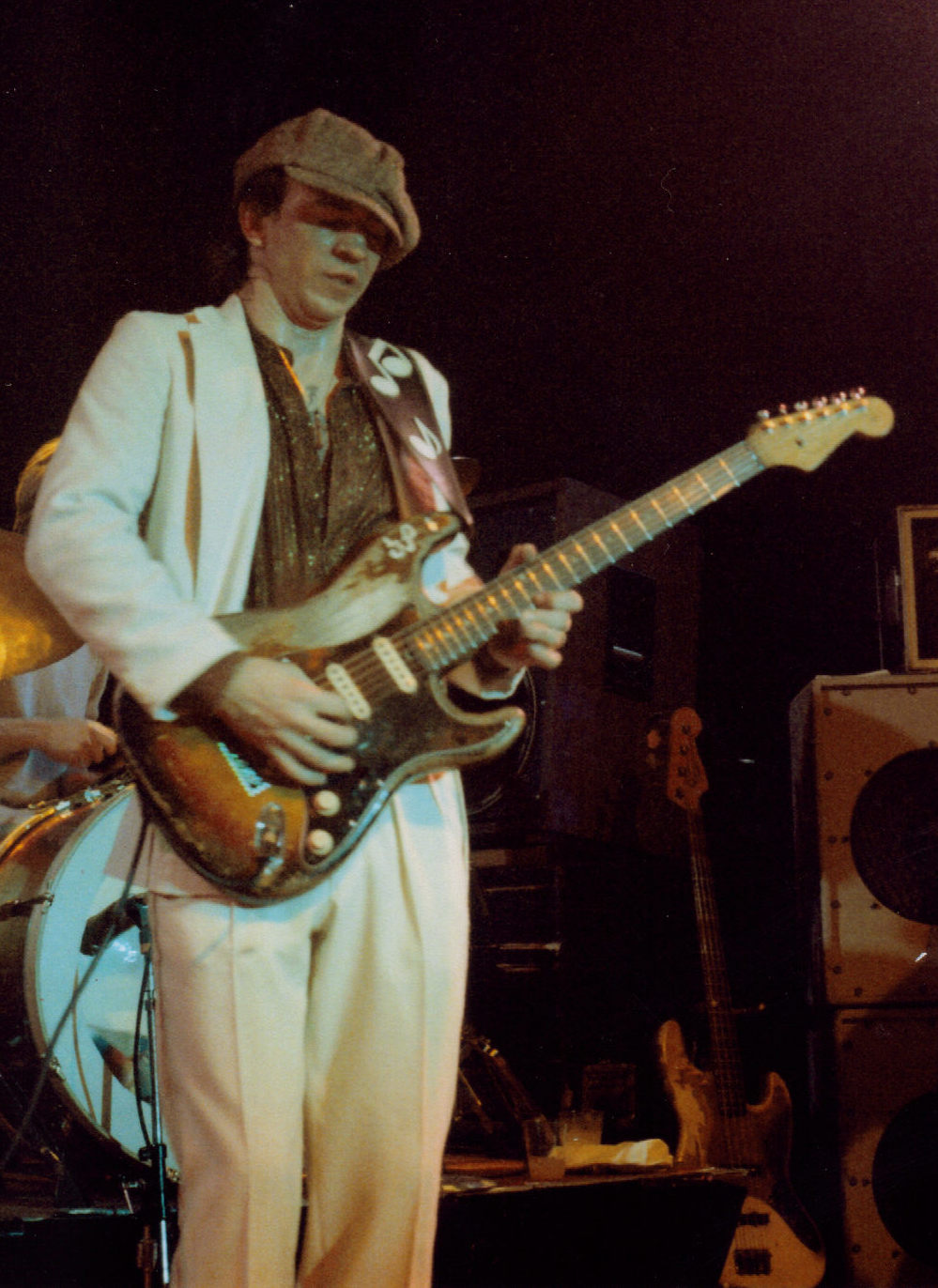
Stevie Ray Vaughan

- August 1 – Carl Ekern, American football player (b. 1954)
- August 6 – Lemuel C. Shepherd, Jr., 4-star general of the American Marine Corps (b. 1896)
- August 9 – Dorothy Appleby, American film actress (b. 1906)
- August 12 – Dorothy Mackaill, British-born American actress (b. 1903)
- August 17 – Pearl Bailey, American actress and singer (b. 1918)
- August 18 – B. F. Skinner, American psychologist (b. 1904)
- August 23 – David Rose, British-born American songwriter, composer, and arranger (b. 1910)
- August 25 – Willard L. Beaulac, American diplomat (b. 1899)
- August 26 – Retta Scott, American animator (b.1916)
- August 27
  - Raymond St. Jacques, American actor (b. 1930)
  - Stevie Ray Vaughan, American guitarist (b. 1954)
- August 28 – Larry Jackson, American baseball player and politician (b. 1931)
- August 30 – Lou Garland, American baseball player (b. 1905)

=== September ===
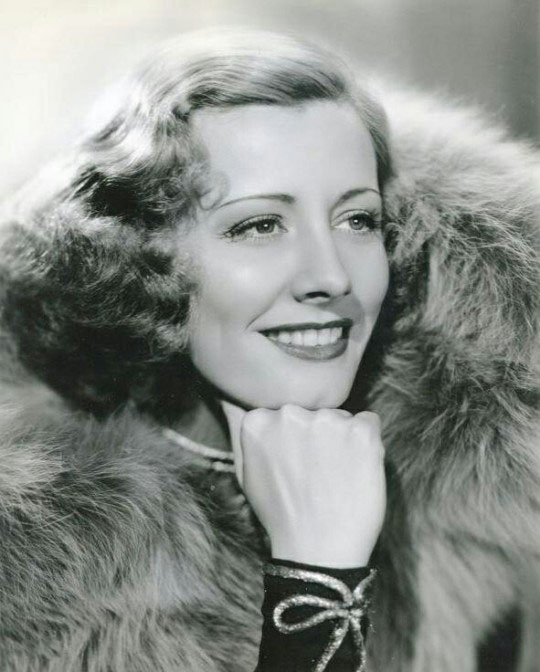
Irene Dunne

- September 1 – Buster Adams, American baseball player (b. 1915)
- September 4 – Irene Dunne, American actress (b. 1898)
- September 6 – Tom Fogerty, American musician (b. 1941)
- September 8 – Joe Gleason, American baseball pitcher (b. 1895)
- September 9 – Doc Cramer, American baseball player (b. 1905)
- September 14 – Lotus Long, American actress (b. 1909)
- September 19 – Hermes Pan, American choreographer (b. 1910)
- September 22 – John A. Danaher, American politician (b. 1899)
- September 23 – Betty Warfel, American professional baseball player (b. 1928)

=== October ===
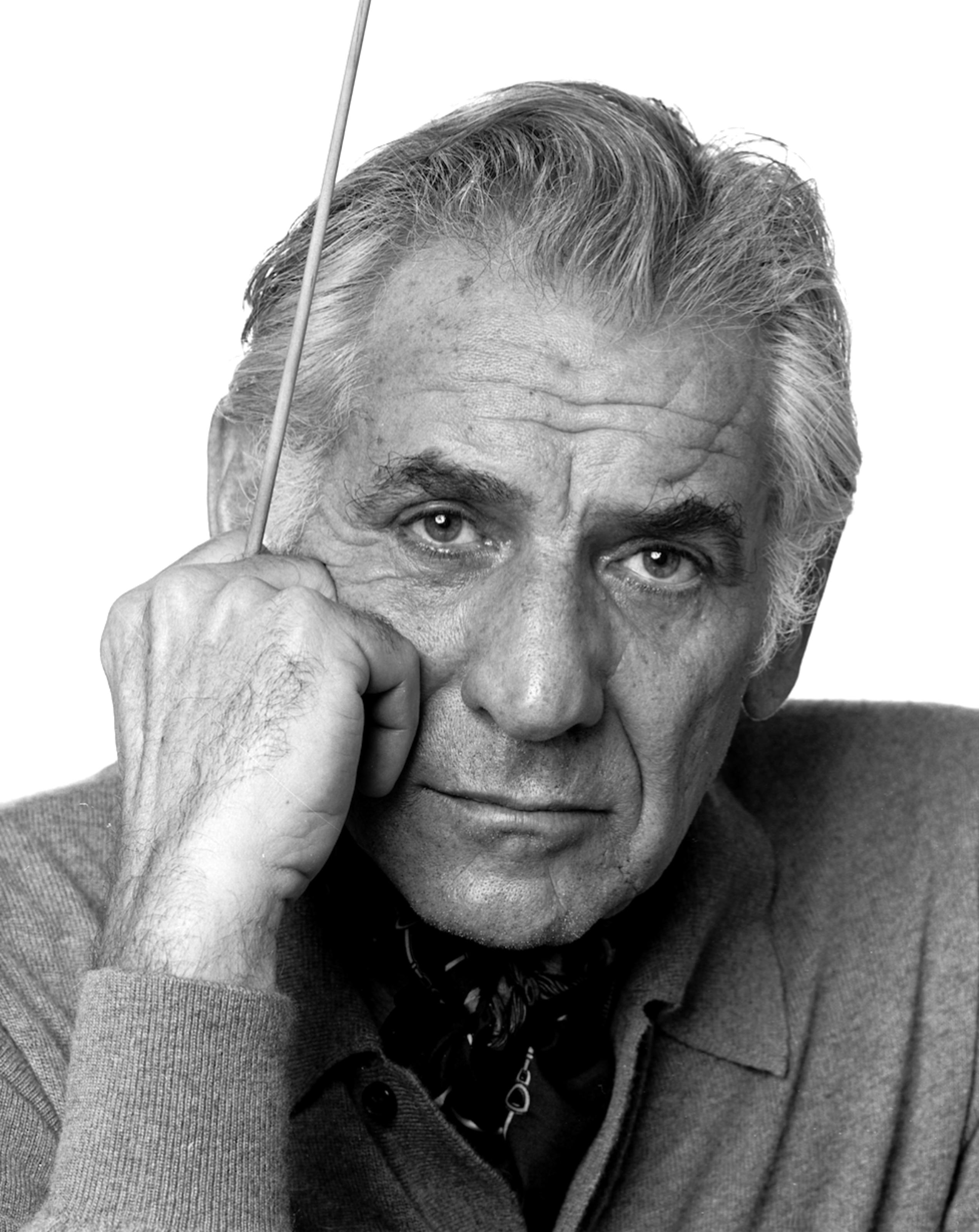
Leonard Bernstein

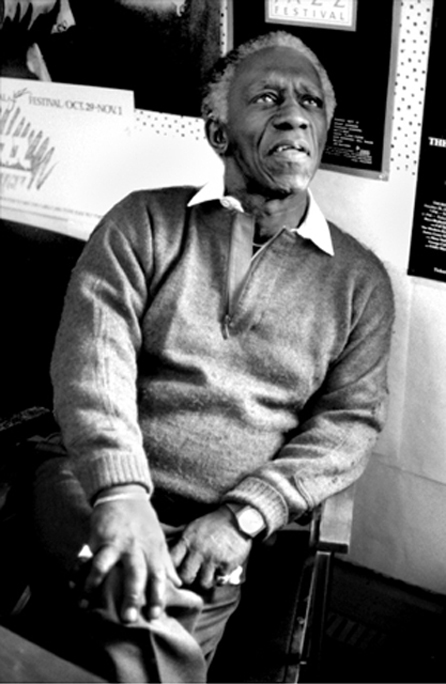
Art Blakey

- October 1 – Curtis LeMay, United States Air Force general (b. 1906)
- October 7 – Grim Natwick, American animator (b. 1890)
- October 8 – William Henry Harrison III, American politician (b. 1896)
- October 13 – Douglas Edwards, American television news anchor (b. 1917)
- October 14 – Leonard Bernstein, American composer and conductor (b. 1918)
- October 15 – Helen Bray, American actress (b. 1889)
- October 16
  - Art Blakey, American jazz musician (b. 1919)
  - Jorge Bolet, Cuban-American pianist and conductor (b, 1914)
- October 20 – Joel McCrea, American actor (b. 1905)
- October 24 – John Sex, American cabaret singer (b. 1956)
- October 26 – William S. Paley, American media executive (b. 1901)
- October 27
  - Xavier Cugat, Catalan-born bandleader (b. 1900)
  - Elliott Roosevelt, American writer (b. 1910)
- October 29
  - William Arnold Newton, pornographic actor (b. 1965)
  - Herbert Brodkin, film and television director and producer (b. 1912)
  - William French Smith, American lawyer and former Attorney General of the United States (b. 1917)
- October 30 – Tom Steele, Scottish-born American actor and stuntman (b. 1909)

=== November ===
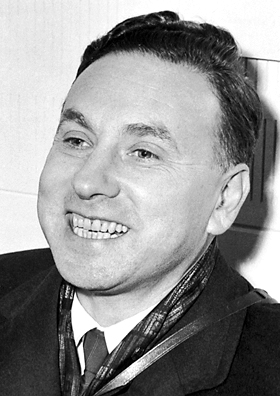
Robert Hofstadter

- November 3 – Mary Martin, American actress and singer (b. 1913)
- November 4 – Robb White, American writer (b. 1909)
- November 5 – Meir Kahane, American rabbi and political figure (b. 1932)
- November 7 – Vito Russo, American activist, historian, and author (b. 1946)
- November 11 – Elliott Chaze, American journalist and novelist (b. 1915)
- November 12 – Eve Arden, American actress (b. 1908)
- November 17 – Robert Hofstadter, American physicist, Nobel Prize laureate (b. 1915)
- November 18 – Harwell Hamilton Harris, American architect (b. 1903)
- November 27 – David White, American actor (b. 1916)

=== December ===
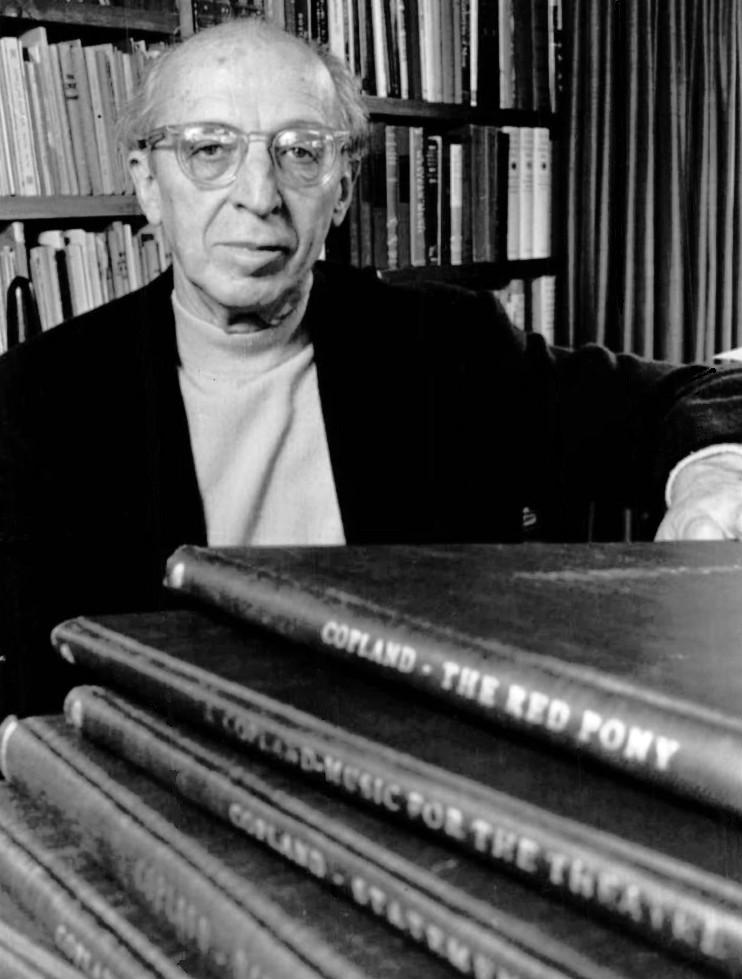
Aaron Copland

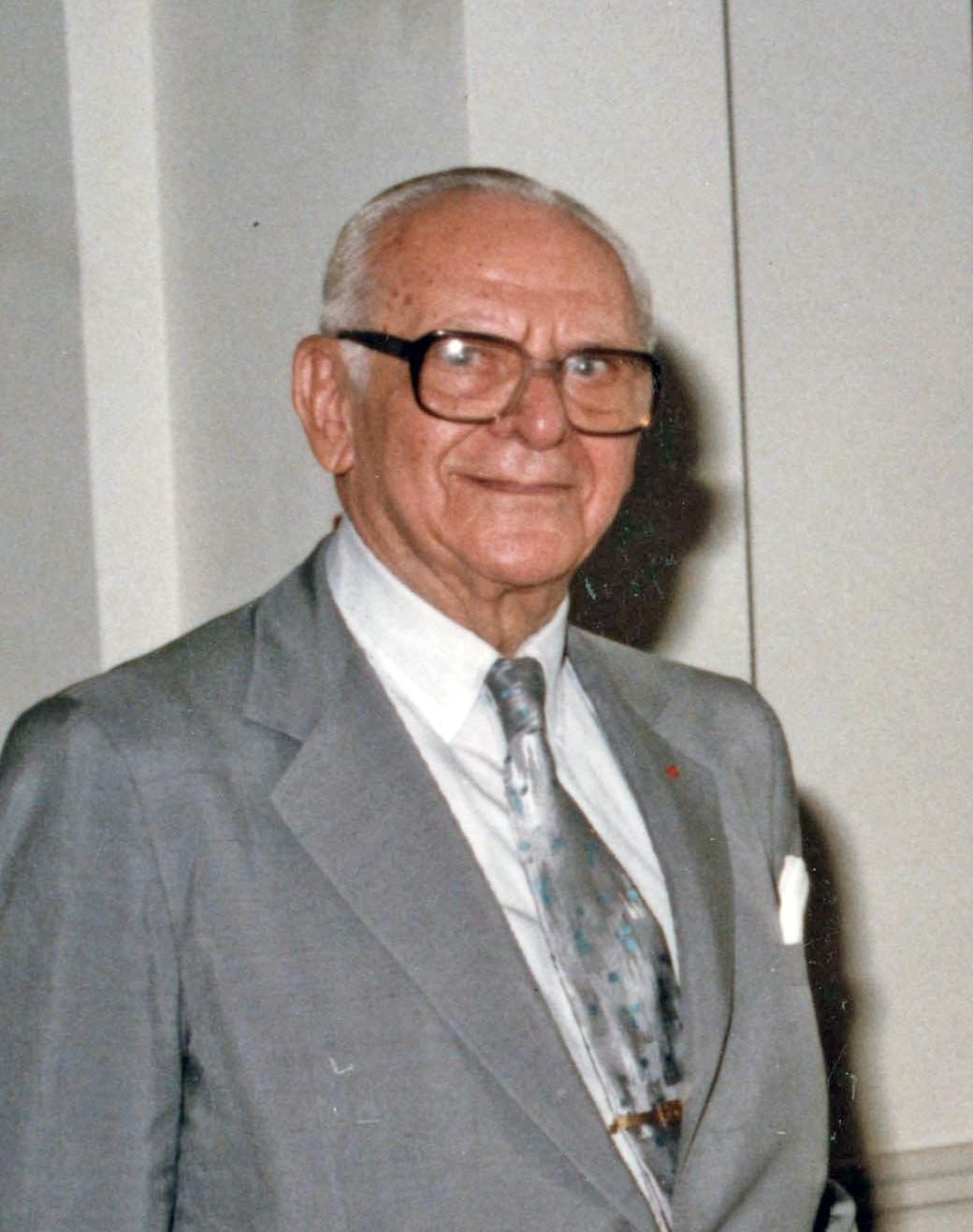
Armand Hammer

- December 2
  - Aaron Copland, American composer (b. 1900)
  - Robert Cummings, American actor (b. 1910)
- December 4 – Edward Binns, American actor (b. 1916)
- December 7
  - Joan Bennett, American actress (b. 1910)
  - Dee Clark, American soul singer (b. 1938)
- December 8 – Martin Ritt, American film director (b. 1914)
- December 9 – Mike Mazurki, American actor and wrestler (b. 1907)
- December 10 – Armand Hammer, American business tycoon (b. 1898)
- December 13 – Alice Marble, American tennis champion (b. 1913)
- December 15
  - Jean Paige, American actress (b. 1895)
  - Edmund Parker, Kenpo founder (b. 1931)
- December 16 – Douglas Campbell, World War I pilot (b. 1896)
- December 18 – Anne Revere, American actress (b. 1903)
- December 20 – Elmo Tanner, American singer and whistler (b. 1910)
- December 28
  - Kiel Martin, American actor (b. 1944)
  - Warren Skaaren, American screenwriter and film producer (b. 1946)
- December 31 – George Allen, American football coach (b. 1918)

=== Undated ===
- Caroline F. Ware, historian and New Deal activist (b. 1899)

== See also ==
- 1990 in American television
- List of American films of 1990
- Timeline of United States history (1990–2009)
