= America's Next Top Model season 20 =

America's Next Top Model
- Season 20
- Judges: Tyra Banks; Kelly Cutrone; Rob Evans; Bryanboy
- No. of contestants: 16
- Winner: Jourdan Miller
- No. of episodes: 15

Release
- Original network: The CW
- Original release: August 2 – November 15, 2013

Season chronology
- ← Previous; Season 19 Next → Season 21

The twentieth cycle of America's Next Top Model (subtitled as America's Next Top Model: Guys & Girls and stylized as ANTM 2.0) premiered on August 2, 2013. It was the 14th season to air on The CW. Tyra Banks, Kelly Cutrone, Bryanboy, and Rob Evans all returned as judges. As in the previous cycle, public voting was still a factor in eliminations. This was the first cycle of the show to feature male contestants. Tyra indicated in an interview that a school version called LeGore's Next Top Model (2011), inspired her to start including male contestants. The international destination for this cycle was Bali, Indonesia, the first visit in Southeast Asia since cycle 6.

The prizes for this cycle included a modeling contract with NEXT Model Management, a spread in Nylon magazine, and a US$100,000 campaign with Guess.

The winner of the competition was 19-year-old Jourdan Miller from Bend, Oregon with Marvin Cortes placing as runner up.

== Contestants ==
(Ages stated are at start of contest)

Contestant	Age	Height	Hometown	Finish	Place
Bianca Wilson	18	1.77 m (5 ft 9 1/2 in)	Los Angeles, California	Episode 2	16
Christopher 'Chris' Schellenger	24	1.76 m (5 ft 9 1/2 in)	Houston, Texas	Episode 2	15
Chlea Ramirez	20	1.78 m (5 ft 10 in)	Bear, Delaware	Episode 3	14
Michael 'Mike' Scocozza	27	1.95 m (6 ft 5 in)	Brodheadsville, Pennsylvania	Episode 4	13
Bianca 'Kanani' Andaluz	19	1.71 m (5 ft 7 1/2 in)	Humboldt Park, Illinois	Episode 6	12
Jiana Davis	20	1.78 m (5 ft 10 in)	Denver, Colorado	Episode 7	11
Philip 'Phil' Sullivan	24	1.92 m (6 ft 3 1/2 in)	Lanesborough, Massachusetts	Episode 8	10
Alexandra Agro	21	1.76 m (5 ft 9 1/2 in)	Palm City, Florida	Episode 10	9
Donald 'Don' Benjamin	25	1.83 m (6 ft 0 in)	Minneapolis, Minnesota	Episode 11	8
Nina Burns	18	1.74 m (5 ft 8 1/2 in)	Berkeley Heights, New Jersey	Episode 12	7
Jeremy Rohmer	19	1.91 m (6 ft 3 in)	Mission Viejo, California	Episode 12	6
Renee Bhagwandeen	24	1.73 m (5 ft 8 in)	Fort Lauderdale, Florida	Episode 13	5
Christopher 'Chris' Hernandez	25	1.87 m (6 ft 1 1/2 in)	North Bergen, New Jersey	Episode 13	4
Cory Wade Hindorff	22	1.88 m (6 ft 2 in)	Philadelphia, Pennsylvania	Episode 15	3
Marvin Cortes	20	1.85 m (6 ft 1 in)	Bronx, New York	Episode 15	2
Jourdan Miller	19	1.85 m (6 ft 1 in)	Bend, Oregon	Episode 15	1

== Episodes ==
No. overall	No. in season	Title	Original release date	US viewers (millions)
239	1	"Meet the Guys & Girls of Cycle 20"	August 2, 2013	1.55
The contestants for cycle twenty were taken to Los Angeles where for the first time in the show's history, men would be able to participate. At first the men were separated from the women, but they later met in masquerade ball fashion show. There, they had to pick their partners and kiss them at the end of the runway. Notable scenes were Cory, who picked a bloke instead of a lady as a partner, Chris H., who chose two female partners, and Bianca with Chlea, both of whom were left without a bloke to walk with. Afterwards, the contestants were interviewed individually. Jourdan revealed that she had married and divorced a bloke at the age of eighteen. Virgg talked about her being transgender, and that she had begun to take hormones in preparation for sex reassignment surgery. Mike confessed that he had been discovered by Tyra while working on an ice cream truck. Jeremy admitted that he had been chubby as a kid, but managed to overcome his struggles and become fit. Marvin talked about his home life, and about his father's profession as a janitor. Chris H. spoke about his experience of having been homeless. Later, all thirty-five contestants were driven to the top model house. There, the pool of contestants was narrowed down to twenty-six contestants who would spend the night there before the permanent and official cast was revealed. The top twenty-six contestants moved into the top model home, where they would spend the night. Tyra and Rob dropped by in order to talk to the hopefuls about the different aspects of male and female modeling. Personalities clashed when playful Chris H., punched Phil in his groin area. He was quickly confronted by the other male models. Seeing this, Nina tried to comfort him and got to know him more. Later that night, the contestants were photographed so that they could earn the fan votes that would allow them into the final cast. Chris H. and Jourdan struggled during the beginning of the shoot, while others excelled. Back at the model house, Jourdan began to talk to Jeremy and told him that they were only friends. She also stated that she felt uncomfortable and slightly irritated with Jeremy following her around. Nina talked to Chris H. and tried to convince him to open up to more to the people there. Immediately before the final cast was going to be revealed, Virgg requested to speak to Tyra. She explained that the hormones were taking a toll on her, and as a result, she had decided to quit the competition. The top sixteen contestants were then revealed by Tyra, leaving the eliminated contestants to be sent home. Immediately after, Tyra announced that they would have to walk on a vertical runway for Guess, but continued with a cliffhanger.: Special guests: Paul Marciano
240	2	"The Girl Who Gets Married Again"	August 9, 2013	1.22
The episode began with the conclusion of the last episode, where the chosen top sixteen contestants had a vertical catwalk for Guess as their first challenge with Rob and supermodel Jessica Hart as the judges. Chlea described Kelly's attitude backstage. Marvin, Cory and Renee excelled while Chris H., Bianca and Mike struggled. Bianca completely gave up on the catwalk, opting to go limp down the runway. Rob and Jessica thought Mike's walk was the worst. In contrast, they were impressed by Marvin and Renee. After the challenge, Jessica revealed that Mike and Bianca had been the weakest and that Marvin and Renee had been the standouts. Ultimately, Renee was chosen as the challenge winner for having the highest challenge score. As her reward, she got to use the Tyra Suite, which she chose to share with Kanani. Back at the model house, the models were able to see all the scores from the challenge. Mike and Bianca are the two lowest scores, which made Mike worried. As a result, he proceeded to drink himself to sleep. The next day the contestants had their first photo shoot where they had to portray different types of weddings. Jourdan impressed during her session, and managed to deliver a great picture. Marvin, Don and Chris H. receive praise for doing well. Mike on the other hand was chastised for looking stiff, which led to Alexandra outshining him in their shot. Marvin was praised for his shot who outshone the girls in his photo while Bianca who failed to do that was criticised. Chris S. and Phil also struggled at the shoot. At panel, Chris H., Don, Jiana and Alexandra received good feedback. Marvin received praise for his strong photograph, and later received first call-out for having the highest combined score. Chlea was reprimanded by Kelly for her behavior at the challenge, while Phil was told that he had one of the lowest social media scores. Mike, Chris S., and Bianca ultimately wound up in the bottom three. Tyra noted that Mike had the worst walk of the bunch, and that she felt that Bianca had faded in the group shot. Despite his high fashion look, she critiqued Chris S. for having produced a weak photograph. Bianca was eliminated first for having the lowest overall score. Chris S. followed suit, leaving Mike to be spared from elimination.: Featured photographer: Douglas Friedman; Special guests: Jessica Hart
241	3	"The Guy Who Gets a Weave"	August 16, 2013	1.40
Marvin got to stay in the Tyra Suite after having received a best photo, which he chose to share with Don. Cory became irritated because he felt that the other guys in the competition were acting like a bunch of hormonal teenagers. The next day, the contestants were taken to a penthouse. Tyra and Rob came in to teach them a lesson on how to create chemistry in their photos. The models began practicing the three rules of sexual chemistry, fresh breath, tension and inhale. Then, the models are paired up to showcase what they have learnt. A lot of the couples were pretty good at selling this, with the exception of Phil, who felt uncomfortable partnering with Alexandra. The models were told that they were doing a risqué photo shoot, and that they were going to be working in pairs with Rob and Victoria's Secret model Alessandra Ambrosio. Chris H., Jiana, Jourdan and Renee excelled at the shoot, while Don, Marvin and Chlea struggled to look sexy. After the shoot, the models went back to their house. There they found a Tyra Mail, which told them that they would be receiving their makeovers. At the makeovers, almost everyone was satisfied with their new looks. Kelly went up to Chlea during her makeover and asked her if they could 'make over' their relationship, feeling that they gotten off on the wrong foot. They talked out their issues and hugged it out. The guys also learned that they would undergo hair removal, which some of the female contestants got a hoot out of watching. At judging, both Jiana and Mike received praise for their strong shots. Mike redeemed himself and received the best photo of the week. Chlea, Don, Phil and Marvin received mediocre feedback. Meanwhile, Jeremy was critiqued by Tyra, who said he looked like a "Gorilla" in his photo. Chlea and Don wound up in the bottom two for producing lackluster photographs. Don was ultimately saved and Chlea was eliminated.: Featured photographer: Sarah Silver; Special guests: Alessandra Ambrosio, Chad Kenyon, Yuki Tomoyuki, Harry Karp, Adrian Mekertichian, Christopher
242	4	"The Girl Who Went Around in Circles"	August 23, 2013	0.85
The episode starts off with everyone hovering over Mike's photo from the prior elimination. Mike told Chris H. to "shut up", which set him off. Chris H. and Mike began to argue, with Chris H. demanding an apology from Mike. Cory then talked to Chris H. and asked why he reacted to people the way he did. Cory told him that he needed to talk to everyone in the house and tell them his story. Chris H. called for a house meeting and proceeded to tell everyone that because of his past, he just didn't know how to act around people and how to cope with things. Most of the contestants could understand where he was coming from, but Mike remained unswayed by Chris H.'s confession. The next day the contestants went to a club where they met Johnny and a special guest, the editor of Nylon magazine, Marvin Scott Jarrett. He told the models that they would be doing a fashion show on a rotating platform. Mike received some tips from Johnny about his runway walk, since he had the worst walk in the competition. Backstage Johnny introduced the models to their stylists Ashton Michael and Kimberley Gordon, who were also going to judge their walks. Nina began to worry because she had sprained one of her ankles during casting week. She worried that she would be unable to participate in the challenge. Instead of backing out from the challenge, she tried wrapping her ankle to see if that would help with her walk without the risk of getting hurt. Chris H. comforted Nina and told her that she was very strong. During the show, Jourdan, Renee, Phil and Chris H. excelled. Jeremy and Mike struggled most, both Ashton and Kimberley agreed that they had been the worst. In the end, Jourdan was revealed to be the winner of the challenge. As a reward, she was allowed to keep her wardrobe from the show. She was also given the opportunity to make an appearance on Nylon TV. Back at the house the models were able to see their scores from the challenge. Mike and Jeremy had the lowest scores, which made Jeremy extremely worried. The models went to their next photo shoot, where they would be posing in a trailer park with a Honey Boo Boo impersonator in groups. The models were allowed to choose their partners for the shoot, which left Jeremy, Kanani and Don to work as a trio. During the shoot, Jourdan, Chris H., Cory, Nina and Phil received praise from the photographer. Jeremy struggled, and Mike was chastised for not doing his best. Marvin was also criticized for having the same facial expression in each shot. At panel, Jourdan, Phil, Nina, Don and Chris H. received praise from the judges. Jourdan received best photo for having the highest overall score of the week. Mike and Jeremy both received negative feedback, and were consequently placed in the bottom two. Tyra critiqued Mike for delivering yet another weak photograph. She also revealed that the judges were worried that his strong photo the week before had just been luck. Jeremy was criticized for his declining performance despite having strong potential. By a margin of just 0.10, Jeremy was able to remain in the competition.: Featured photographer: Mark "The Cobra Snake" Hunter; Special guests: Marvin Scott Jarrett, Ashton Michael, Kimberley Gordon, Caroline D'Amore, Sugar Pop Pop
243	5	"The Guy Who Gets to Kiss the Girl"	August 30, 2013	1.12
Tensions flared at the house when Jourdan took an extra five minutes on the phone, proceeding to take time from someone else’s phone call. She had been given the task to choose the phone time for everyone in the house, but arranged the phone schedules so that Nina and herself would receive ten minutes on the phone with everyone else getting five. This made everyone in the house very irritated with her, especially Renee, who decided to take her anger a step further by threatening to slap Jourdan in the face. Later that same day, the contestants were challenged to become fashion correspondents. The task is overseen by Bryanboy and Perez Hilton. The contestants are asked to pull random people off the street and conduct interviews with them about their personal style. After the challenge, Perez called out Jiana and Marvin as the weakest during the challenge for having failed to ask all the questions he and Bryanboy had requested. For having fulfilled all of the requirements while conducting the interviews, Jeremy was chosen as the challenge winner. He was also told that he could pick one of the female contestants to share the prize with. He choose Jourdan, irritating the other models even further. As their prize, they were allowed to go out to dinner together. During their night out of the house, Jeremy and Jourdan began talking about their lives and their stories. The following day, the contestants must shoot for a body spray commercial in which they are asked to dress as the opposite gender and share a passionate kiss. They are also allowed to choose their partners for the commercial. Cory, Don and Kanani excelled, while Marvin and Alexandra struggled. Some of the contestants thought that Jiana was focusing too much on Phil rather than herself. Nina was also criticized for failing to be masculine. At judging, Cory was hailed with praise for his performance during the commercial. He later received first call-out. Don, Phil, and Kanani received mostly positive critique for their performances, with the majority of the other contestants receiving mixed feedback. Ultimately, Jiana and Alexandra were placed in the bottom two. Despite having been front-runners at the beginning of the competition, Tyra explained that both of their performances in the commercial had left much to be desired. The final scores were revealed, and Jiana managed to escape being eliminated from the competition.: Featured commercial director: Jeremy Rowley; Special guests: Perez Hilton
244	6	"The Girl Who is Scared of Clowns"	September 6, 2013	1.26
The episode began with the contestants returning to the house. Due to her distress over having been in the bottom two the previous elimination, Cory chose Jiana to share the Tyra suite with him. Phil continually interrupted the two during their stay in the suite, irritating both them. Cory spoke to Jeremy about him possibly liking Jourdan, but Jeremy denied Cory's skepticism. While the female contestants were showering, some of the male contestants decided to prank them by taping their possessions to the walls. On the day of the challenge, the contestants were taken to a farm. Kelly and guest Jackie Fraser-Swan explained that where they would have to create two Flixel photos in teams featuring Emerson clothing. Cory, Kanani and Don were chosen as team captains due to having had the three highest scores last panel. The teams consisted of Cory, Phil, Jiana and Chris H.; Kanani, Renee and Jourdan; Don, Marvin, Jeremy and Nina. During the shoots, some of the tension between Kanani, Jourdan and Renee was resolved when Jourdan decided to apologize for her behavior the previous week. Phil aggravated his team by cutting the sleeves off of the designer's clothes as well as throwing a rock at a fence, breaking it. Due to damaging property, Cory's team was placed last for the challenge. Kelly explained that although Don's team produced stellar photos, they had forgotten to use a female model in one of their pictures. As a result, Kanani's team won the challenge. Chris H. became angered by his low score in the challenge and began taking it out on other contestants. Nina attempted to calm him down but he blew up at her, shocking and hurting her. Later that night some of the boys decided to place clown dolls in the female contestants' room, fully aware of the fact that Renee and Kanani were scared of clowns. Kanani began to panic when she saw the dolls, proceeding to break down and cry due to her alleged coulrophobia. The following day the contestants met Johnny, who announced that the theme of the photo shoot would be a beauty shot focusing on nail art. They also met photographer Franco Lacosta. After being given different themes, the contestants began to get their nail art and make-up applied. Jeremy irritated Jourdan for teasing her about the kiss they had the previous week at the shoot. Still mad about the events that had taken place earlier, Nina proceeded to ignore Chris H. the whole time. During the shoot, Renee, Marvin, Jourdan, and Don excelled. Nina and Kanani struggled with their concentration during their sessions. Johnny became displeased with Jeremy's performance, while Phil was chastised for failing to look more masculine. At panel, Cory, Marvin and Jourdan all received praise for the strong photographs they managed to deliver. Chris H. received positive feedback from the judges, but was met with mixed reactions from social media. During the elimination ceremony, Jourdan was awarded best photo for the second time. After all the other contestants were declared safe, Jeremy, Kanani, and Phil were called forward by Tyra as the bottom three. Tyra noted that while the judges thought Jeremy had strong potential, he was failing to prove himself as the competition progressed. Kanani and Phil were both called out on their underwhelming photos and their sub par performances during the photo shoot. The final scores began to roll, and Jeremy became the first contestant to be eliminated from the competition. Soon after his exit, an emotional Kanani followed suit.: Featured photographer: Franco Lacosta; Special guests: Jackie Fraser-Swan
245	7	"The Guy Who Cries"	September 13, 2013	1.16
The contestants met Kelly downtown for their challenge. They were ordered to strip down into their underwear for a fashion related quiz. Each correct answer would earn them money so that they could put together a look for MyEveryNeed.com. The model who could put together the best overall look would receive a US$2,000 gift card. Some of the contestants struggled to answer the questions correctly, resulting in a low spending budget for their clothes. Multiple contestants had a hard time finding clothes that met their budgets, especially Phil, who had a meager budget of just twenty-five dollars. After the challenge, the contestants were introduced to celebrity stylist Monica Rose. Most of the contestants received mildly good reviews, with the exception of Phil, who was harshly criticized for having worn women’s leggings and a T-shirt. He was scolded for making a mockery out of the challenge. Don was ultimately chosen as the challenge winner. In addition to winning the gift card, he was also allowed to take Marvin and Renee out for ice cream. On the day of the photo shoot, the contestants were all taken to a photo studio where they saw an exhibit of pictures of Tyra impersonating multiple iconic models. Johnny explained that for the shoot, they would all get paint thrown at them. The finished product would later be displayed in the gallery along with Tyra's photos. At the shoot, Marvin, Phil and Jiana received negative remarks on their performances. Chris and Nina initially struggled, but still managed to impress Johnny and the photographer. Jourdan, Cory and Renee were all lauded for their strong poses. Back at the house, the female contestants became angry after Chris decided to shower in their room before they did. Meanwhile, Marvin was still having a hard time getting his emotions under control. At judging panel, Renee, Chris and Nina all received praise for their pictures. Jourdan received a perfect score from the judges, and subsequently won best photo for having obtained the highest overall score. Tyra also noted that she believed her photograph was one of the best produced in the history of the show. Jiana and Phil were in danger for bottom two on the second consecutive week. Phil was once again chastised for his poor performance during the shoot while Jiana was told that the judges felt her performance in the competition was continually declining as the weeks progressed. Phil escaped his elimination and Jiana was eliminated.: Featured photographer: Udo Spreitzenbarth; Special guests: Monica Rose
246	8	"The Girl Whose Walk is TOO Good"	September 20, 2013	1.12
The contestants meet Rob and special guest Alexis Borges of Next Model Management. They revealed that their challenge was to book a maximum of two go-sees at Style Fashion Week. All had a chance to compete for a place for designer Paulie Gibson and secondly, the female contestants competed for a place with XCVI while the male contestants went to see Civil Society. Overall, Chris, Don, Phil and Renee booked the maximum two shows, Cory and Nina only booked one show, while Marvin and Jourdan booked no shows, which causes upset for Jourdan as Paulie previously told her that her walk was "too great". The contestants then performed their respective runway shows. Alexis announced that Renee had won the challenge and won a selection of clothes from all three designers in the challenge. Back at the house, Phil expresses concern after just receiving eight points, which causes confusion. The following day, the contestants arrive at Canyon Ranch using the fields as the contestants must pose horizontally in the grass to make a magical couture whilst being photographed from above. At the shoot, Chris, Cory, Nina, Jourdan and Renee all receive good feedback whereas Marvin seems lukewarm and doesn't follow direction well. Don struggles to perform well and Phil receives a bad critique after showing the same position and face expression with no intensity. Some commotion is caused when Jourdan throws a frog from the field onto Renee's dress, which heightens tensions between the two. At judging panel, Jourdan, Cory, Nina and Renee receive mainly strong feedback. The judges seem concerned about Don's expression staying the same throughout the weeks. The judges question Jourdan and Marvin regarding their lack of shows booked during the challenge. Chris receives moderate feedback whereas Marvin receives a bad critic regarding his "baby" like expression in his face. Phil receives criticism after portraying a female like face in his shots. Chris received best photo. In the end, Marvin and Phil landed in the bottom two, Phil for the third time. Phil was criticized for being in the bottom two for the third time and not portraying a different face and expression each week while Marvin was told he had a great bone structure but the judges are nervous about his chance at booking shows. The scores were revealed and Phil had the lowest score, and Phil was eliminated. Alexandra, Chlea, Jeremy, Jiana, Kanani and Mike, along with the recently eliminated Phil to have gained a place for a come back in the competition. Each eliminated contestant by gender have the highest social media score would return to the competition and also would join in the chance to go to the Indonesian island of Bali to continue the competition. Alexandra was the first contestant to return the competition. Immediately afterwards, Tyra announced that as one girl had returned, one guy would also return. The episode ended with a cliffhanger.: Featured photographer: Matthew Jordan Smith; Special guests: Alexis Borges, Paulie Gibson, Daniela Zeltzer, Brad Schwartz
247	9	"The Guys and Girls Get Flirty"	September 27, 2013	1.02
Clip show with "Behind the Scenes" footage including never before seen clips throughout the show like Phil's wildest activities inside the house (special segment called Phil-er), the visit of last cycle's winner Laura James, Nina's hula hoop performance, Don and Alexandra's intimate relationship, Chris H.'s beauty tips and kissing lessons, Renee's tears of joy during the makeover, Marvin and Phil's reenactment of the judges, the mysterious insect they found in the house, the prank of the girls to the guys as a revenge, the visit of the psychologist where Jourdan became emotional, the game "Truth, Tooch or Dare" where Jeremy and Jiana shared a kiss, and "The Top Ten Flirty Moments" on the cycle.
248	10	"The Girl Who Gets Punked"	October 4, 2013	1.14
Concluded from the previous episode, Tyra reveals Jeremy as the second person to return to the competition. After Phil's elimination and Alexandra and Jeremy's return, Chris received best photo last week will use the Guess Closet; he chose Alexandra to join him, much to Nina's chagrin. At the challenge, the remaining girls and guys meet Kelly and Vincent St. George (Reggie Watts). The models have to audition for a commercial for Quaff water. Alexandra and Jourdan excel at the challenge, while Chris's performance was deemed as "bizarre". Renee revealed she has a fear of things that are disguised in a suit, but ultimately does well. Jourdan impressed Reggie the most and was declared as the winner of the challenge. Tensions flare at the top model house between the male contestants and the female contestants, when Chris complained that the female contestants were making a mess in the kitchen, particularly towards Renee for not cleaning her dish. Renee takes offense to this and an argument erupts between Chris, Renee, Jeremy and Jourdan. After the row, Jourdan makes up with Chris and Jeremy apologizes to Jourdan for making a comment on her divorce. Renee refuses to apologize to Chris, after speaking with Cory. Later, the contestants are taken to Birmingham High School where greeted by Johnny Wujek and Tyra. The photo shoot this week is all about 'flawsome' and embracing your flaws, while shooting alongside actress, singer and dancer Zendaya and albino male model Shaun Ross. The contestants had to embody and embraces different types of flaws. During the photo shoot, Don, Nina, Marvin and Renee perform well at embracing their flaws. Cory initially struggles but manages to take a strong photo, while Jourdan got distracted by Jeremy during her shoot. Chris fails to get a good shot after finding it difficult to show his gap, as did Alexandra who fell flat. At judging, Cory, Don, Renee and Nina receive positive reviews for their Flawsome photos. Nina would later get best photo of the week. Jeremy, Jourdan, Chris and Marvin receive mostly mixed feedback by the judges, while Alexandra's photo was castigated poorly for looking a little older. During panel, Alexandra storms out to the waiting room after feeling dizzy and sick. Alexandra and Chris find themselves in the bottom two for their poor performances - Chris who was left alone as Alexandra was resting in the waiting room, was revealed to still be in the running, while Alexandra was sent home; marking the first time a contestant is eliminated without appearing during the final call out.: Featured photographer: Sarah Silver; Special guests: Reggie Watts, Zendaya, Shaun Ross, Ken Mok
249	11	"The Guy Who Has a Panic Attack"	October 11, 2013	1.13
The contestants have arrived in Bali as they went to the Ayana resort. At the pool, Chris and Marvin had a minor confrontation when Marvin thought Chris' score last week was unbalanced due to Kelly Cutrone constantly giving him higher scores. Cory agrees, and thinks Chris is immature. Both Marvin and Cory agree that Chris should have gone home last panel. Afterwards, they went to their challenge, where they meet with Johnny Wujek who introduces Carole Lacroix, the product manager of swimsuit and underwear line' 69 Slam. The contestants will have to walk under water, while wearing Seawalker helmets to help them breathe. Don is especially worried by this, due to have past anxiety attacks. Nina reveals she had part of her lungs removed due to inhaling an airborne fungus. At the sea runway, Jourdan, Renee and Chris did extremely well for the most part, while Marvin and Jeremy fell flat in convincing the designer by their walk. Nina broke down which frustrated Chris, after being told she cannot participate in the sea runway for her lung problem. As a result, she and Don who panicked under water and quickly bailed the runway, have to jump in the sea and pose while wearing snorkels, instead of walking with a helmet. Later, Renee won the challenge for having the best performance under water. Back at the house, Nina and Don got the lowest score for the challenge, which made them upset at the cost of potentially going home. Meanwhile, Renee and Marvin continue flirting. At the photo shoot, the contestants are taken to the Bali Safari and Marine Park, where they have to embody and pose with different animals. During the shoot, Jeremy and Cory excelled while the rest fell flat, especially Marvin, Chris and Nina. Nina broke down again after receiving mixed feedback at her shoot, and while the others tried to calm her down, Chris - who was considered to be her closest friend, neglected her. When Jeremy stated that he thinks he will get best photo this week, Renee and Marvin argued over each other's performances and insulting one another after Marvin made a remark against Renee's arrogance. At panel, all the contestants received generally mixed to negative feedback, including Renee, Don, Jourdan, Chris and Marvin, but Nina's stunning photo earned her second best photo of the week in the competition. Don and Marvin landed in the bottom two both for the second time; Marvin, though praised for his charisma, produced another weak photo, and Don, for delivering an average photograph. In the end, Don was eliminated, who thought that he had a better picture than Chris.: Featured photographer: Lennette Newell; Special guests: Carole Lacroix, Laura Fuest
250	12	"The Girl Who Gets Kissed on an Elephant"	October 18, 2013	1.10
The remaining contestants return to the hotel and were met in the living room by Tyra with candles and floor pillows. As the models talked about certain feelings and emotions like Jourdan brought her struggles in the past with her ex-husband, Chris also expressed his jealousy about the others' strong relationships and that he didn't have a close friend in the house which dismays Nina knowing that she had been Chris's closest friend and that he didn't feel the same. The next day, while working out, Jeremy confronted Chris and recalled their past experiences while they were met in Bali. Jeremy pointed out that he was shown by Chris's lack of respect. Everyone in the house started listening to their drama while Nina was sleeping sound. The photoshoot came where they had to model designs by a deaf 11-year old designer, Rafi A. Ridwan and Oka Diputra in a Rice Paddy. The contestants showed their high-fashion abilities to Tyra for a 10-second pose teach. Jourdan, Cory and Marvin excelled and proved their modelling abilities in the shoot while Chris was criticized for being bad tempered and performing lackluster and Nina for not knowing to connect her body and face. Jeremy was told to not having the ability to work his body. Also, Renee was constantly told of her flat expression and inability to stand out. After the photoshoot, they head to Ubud into two teams in three, Chris, Cory, Nina and Renee went to a healing and cleansing trip while Jourdan, Jeremy and Marvin toured around Ubud Monkey Forest. They were housed to the elephant village where tensions rose again while the bed assignment was done. Chris felt he was not assigned properly which prompted Jeremy to be the mature one. Jourdan, Nina and Cory shared the big bed, Marvin and Renee shared the couches, Jeremy slept on the small couch on the room and Chris made his own. The next day, the models rode some elephants where Marvin and Renee; who have the nickname of "Marnee", kissed. They then went back to the hotel and were greeted by the skull Mail. Again, a 'no one is safe' letter was sent, leaving them guessing for a double elimination. At panel, Jourdan, Marvin and Cory received praise for their high fashion editorial photographs while Renee, Jeremy, Chris and Nina received mixed feedback to weak. Having no challenge, this week would prove who delivered the best photo out of everyone else. Jourdan's photograph eventually won her fourth best photo in the competition. Nina, Chris and Jeremy were called for a double elimination; Chris, for not believing in his own abilities, Nina, for producing an average photo despite strong performances throughout the competition, and Jeremy, for still not mastering Head-to-toe modelling. In a shocking elimination, Nina was first to be eliminated, followed by Jeremy, and were both sent home, which dismayed everyone.: Featured Photographer: Jez Smith; Special Guests: Oka Diputra, Rafi A. Ridwan
251	13	"The Guy Who Becomes a Bat"	November 1, 2013	1.01
The contestants had a challenge where they had to prove their physical abilities in a workout challenge as they met with cycle 19 winner Laura James and Rob Evans in the beach, where they were briefed about the challenge. It was a battle within the sexes. Renee versus Jourdan and Chris, Marvin and Cory battled it out as well. Renee beat Jourdan and Marvin won over the male contestants. As a result, the two won the challenge and had the chance to appear in a fitness video with Laura and Rob. They were also rewarded with a spa treatment. At the photo shoot, they were greeted by Johnny in a temple where they had to do shoot with Bats while suspended in the air upside-down. Jourdan started thinking about how the competition would affect Renee and Marvin if one of them got eliminated. Jourdan and Marvin excelled in the shoot and impressed Johnny and Jez the most. Chris's shoot had to take long before a great shot was produced. Cory was directed to not look to feminine in his face and body, while Renee didn't feel good and had her shoot end earlier. At judging, Tyra announced that there would be a final double elimination which would help determine the top three contestants. Jourdan wowed the judges with her stellar photo. Marvin also received great feedback. Renee was criticized for having produced an "amateur" photo. Chris's photo also dismayed the judges, while Cory created polarity amongst the judges at panel as well as in social media. After adding up all the scores, Jourdan received her fifth best picture during elimination, becoming the first contestant. She was commended by Tyra for having performed successfully throughout the competition. She proceeded to nickname her "Sunrise Smize". Marvin was called second and was also lauded for his journey. He received "Booch Blue" as his nickname. Cory, Chris and Renee were called forward for elimination. Renee had the lowest score and exited first. She was followed by Chris, who fell 1.5 points short to Cory and was eliminated. Cory was nicknamed "Fierce Fuchsia".: Featured Photographer: Jez Smith; Special Guests: Laura James
252	14	"Finale Part 1: The Finalists Shoot Their Guess Campaign"	November 8, 2013	1.08
The contestants received a Tyra Mail concerning what they assumed would be a photo shoot for Guess. Johnny has to meet them on-set, as their assumptions were proven correct when they were told that they would having a shoot for Guess. He introduced the models to Yu Tsai, their photographer for the shoot. Immediately before the shoot however, past contestants returned to assist the top three contestants. All of the eliminated contestants (except Bianca Chris S and Alexandra.) have made an entrance wearing the color of the contestant they were supporting. Cory's team consist of Chlea, Jiana, Kanani and Nina. Marvin's team have supported four people: Don, Jeremy, Phil and Renee. Jourdan only received one supporter, Chris H. This left Mike to be part of Jourdan's team, Chris stressed that he picked Jourdan because he felt that Jourdan was ready to be a model. That night, the top three contestants had a chance to talk with their loved ones. Jourdan decided to call her boyfriend, Cory called his mom and Marvin talked with his father. The second photo shoot of the week was for Nylon. Marvin Scott Jarrett shot the three models in different locations. He stressed his awe for the three contestants. He applauded Jourdan's striking performance, Marvin's drive and Cory's masculinity. After the shoot, the contestants had the chance to talk with Jarrett himself about their lives and journey in Top Model. For the last challenge, the top three contestants went to the site where the final runway show would be taking place. Executive Producers Ken Mok and Laura Fuest Silva are at the show where Ken and Laura explained as they would have to perform in a fashion feature, with the theme involving a 'love triangle' with an abusive relationship. Jourdan excelled after performing amazingly and believably. Jourdan and Cory had to kiss with each other, while Marvin felt a bit uneasy. The eliminate contestants must have debated to switch teams, as a result, Mike left Corey's team and switch to Jourdan's team as he felt Jourdan looked like a more model. Twenty minutes before the show has yet to begin, Tyra and the judges revealed a twist that there would be one final elimination before the fashion show. The judges deliberated on the contestants ' Guess photos. Jourdan was praised for having produced a Guess-worthy photograph and having a great social media response for her "booty tooch", but they believed her photo not as strong as it could have been. Marvin was lauded for his cheekbones but Kelly said he was depending too much on his looks. Cory was noted to look very masculine but the Judges were not sure if he could be "the man". The judges said they had already scored the photos and the results were in, and that only two of them would continue on in the competition. The episode ended with a cliffhanger.: Featured Photographers: Yu Tsai (Guess shoot), Dinar Puspita Sari (Nylon shoot); Special Guests: Mrs. Maria, Laura James, Marvin Scott Jarrett, Ken Mok, Laura Fuest Silva
253	15	"Finale Part 2: The Guy or Girl Who Becomes America's Next Top Model"	November 15, 2013	1.29
Concluded from the previous episode, Tyra and the judges have already made the decision, Jourdan and Marvin advanced into the final two and Cory was eliminated. Despite his elimination, Cory will still be given to participate in the final runway. As the final runway was going to start, Tyra opened up the show by speaking to the crowd in Indonesian, and explaining that they would be shown the fashion film that the final three had shot the previous episode. Immediately after this, the catwalk show began. Jourdan tripped with her stilettos on her gown leaving her on the verge of tears. Both Jourdan and Marvin wowed the judges with their performances. The next day, Tyra visited the final two near the villa and told them that they would be having one final photo shoot, focusing on portraying feral and wild jungle creatures. At panel, both Jourdan and Marvin's walks and bodies of work were given praise. After receiving their evaluations, Jourdan was revealed to be the twentieth winner of America's Next Top Model, leaving Marvin as the first male runner-up in the show.: Special Guests: Laura James

== The Comeback Series ==
Much like the previous cycle, The Comeback Series also returned online with Bryanboy as its host. The web series follows the eliminated models as they participate in the photo shoots. This season, the audience enabled two eliminated models, one male and one female, to return to the competition. For having accumulated the highest social media score average, Alex was allowed to return to the competition at the end of episode 8. Immediately after her comeback, it was revealed that one additional male contestant would also be given the opportunity to return. In episode 10, the episode following the season recap, it was revealed that Jeremy was the male model who would be returning to the competition.

Contestant	Public Vote Average	Returned in
Alexandra	7.00	Episode 8
Jeremy	6.70	Episode 10

Note: Bianca and Chris S. did not participate in the Comeback Series.

== Summaries ==
=== Call-out order ===
Order	Episodes													
Order	1 (Note: In the first part of the episode 1, the pool of 35 contestants was reduced to 26 who moved on to the next round of casting. In the second part, the pool of 26 semi-finalists was reduced to 16 contestants who moved on to the main competition.)	2	3	4	5	6	7	8 (Note: In episode 8, all the eliminated models were brought back to panel after Phil's elimination. At the end of the episode, Alexandra was able to return to the competition for having obtained the highest social media score out of the eliminated girls. Just as Jeremy, Mike and Phil were called forward to learn their verdict, the episode ended in a cliffhanger. It was revealed the following episode that Jeremy would return to the competition.)	10	11	12	13	15 (Note: In episode 14, Tyra and the judges revealed that there would be one final elimination before the fashion show. The episode ended in a cliffhanger and the call-out resumed at the next episode. At the beginning of episode 15, it was revealed that Cory had been eliminated.)	
1	Alexandra	Marvin	Mike	Jourdan	Cory	Jourdan	Jourdan	Chris H.	Nina	Nina	Jourdan	Jourdan	Jourdan	Jourdan
2	Mike	Don	Jiana	Nina	Kanani	Marvin	Renee	Nina	Don	Renee	Marvin	Marvin	Marvin	Marvin
3	Renee	Chris H.	Jourdan	Phil	Don	Cory	Nina	Renee	Renee	Jeremy	Cory	Cory	Cory	
4	Cory	Jiana	Nina	Don	Phil	Chris H.	Chris H.	Cory	Jourdan	Cory	Renee	Chris H.		
5	Jourdan	Alexandra	Chris H.	Chris H.	Jourdan	Don	Cory	Jourdan	Cory	Jourdan	Chris H.	Renee		
6	Don	Cory	Cory	Marvin	Chris H.	Renee	Don	Don	Jeremy	Chris H.	Jeremy			
7	Jiana	Jeremy	Alexandra	Jiana	Jeremy	Nina	Marvin	Marvin	Marvin	Marvin	Nina			
8	Chris S.	Renee	Kanani	Cory	Renee	Jiana	Phil	Phil	Chris H.	Don				
9	Chlea	Nina	Renee	Kanani	Nina	Phil	Jiana		Alexandra					
10	Jeremy	Jourdan	Marvin	Alexandra	Marvin	Kanani								
11	Nina	Kanani	Phil	Renee	Jiana	Jeremy								
12	Phil	Chlea	Jeremy	Jeremy	Alexandra									
13	Bianca	Phil	Don	Mike										
14	Chris H.	Mike	Chlea											
15	Kanani	Chris S.												
16	Marvin	Bianca												

The contestant was eliminated
The contestant was eliminated outside of the judging panel
The contestant won the competition

=== Bottom two/three ===
Episode	Contestants	Eliminated
2	Mike, Chris S. & Bianca	Bianca
2	Mike, Chris S. & Bianca	Chris S.
3	Chlea & Don	Chlea
4	Jeremy & Mike	Mike
5	Alexandra & Jiana	Alexandra
6	Phil, Kanani & Jeremy	Kanani
6	Phil, Kanani & Jeremy	Jeremy
7	Phil & Jiana	Jiana
8	Phil & Marvin	Phil
10	Chris H. & Alexandra	Alexandra
11	Don & Marvin	Don
12	Chris H., Jeremy & Nina	Nina
12	Chris H., Jeremy & Nina	Jeremy
13	Cory, Chris H. & Renee	Renee
13	Cory, Chris H. & Renee	Chris H.
15	Cory, Jourdan & Marvin	Cory
15	Cory, Jourdan & Marvin	Marvin

The contestant was eliminated after their first time in the bottom two
The contestant was eliminated after their second time in the bottom two
The contestant was eliminated after their third time in the bottom two
The contestant was eliminated outside of judging panel
The contestant was eliminated in the final judging and placed as the runner-up

=== Average call-out order ===
Casting call-out order, comeback first call-outs and final two are not included.

Rank by average	Place	Model	Call-out total	Number of call-outs	Call-out average
1	1	Jourdan	38	12	3.17
2	3	Cory	51	12	4.25
3	7	Nina	45	10	4.50
4	4	Chris H.	51	11	4.64
5	2	Marvin	63	12	5.25
6	8	Don	49	9	5.44
7	5	Renee	61	11	5.54
8	11	Jiana	41	6	6.83
9–11	6	Jeremy	64	8	8.00
9–11	10	Phil	56	7	8.00
9–11	12	Kanani	40	5	8.00
12	9	Alexandra	43	5	8.60
13	13	Mike	28	3	9.33
14	14	Chlea	26	2	13.00
15	15	Chris S.	15	1	15.00
16	16	Bianca	16	1	16.00

=== Scoring chart ===
Place	Model	Episodes													Total score	Average
Place	Model	2	3	4	5	6	7	8	10	11	12	13	15		Total score	Average
1	Jourdan	31.9	32.8	45.1	41.2	44.2	44.5	37.1	37.1	34.9	33.0	44.0	32.0	27.0 (Note: The final scores of season were originally shown to be 32.0 for Jourdan and 27.5 for Marvin. After the finale aired, several people had noted that the scores were identical to those shown during the first elimination of the finale. Furthermore, while Tyra had announced that the fan vote would have no say in the final scores, they had been added into the final tally nevertheless. In an article released by Reality TV World, it was revealed that there had been a glitch with the final scores during post-production, and that the actual scores for the finale were 27.0 for Jourdan (having received a nine from all three judges) and 25.0 for Marvin (having received 8 points from Tyra and Kelly, and 9 points from Rob). The CW acknowledged the finale contained incorrect scoring graphics after being contacted about the discrepancy. During an exclusive statement, a representative of the network was quoted as saying: "There was a technical error with the on-air graphics that occurred during post-production of the finale of ANTM, however, as you can see in the photo, it didn't change the outcome meaning Jourdan is still the winner.")	425.8	38.7
2	Marvin	42.1	27.8	40.1	35.7	43.0	34.0	31.9	35.7	32.6	32.7	42.7	27.5	25.0	398.3	36.2
3	Cory	35.6	28.8	38.1	45.7	42.2	35.3	38.5	37.0	35.4	30.0	38.2	26.6		404.8	36.8
4	Chris H.	39.1	29.8	40.6	40.3	39.8	36.8	43.1	34.8	33.5	28.5	36.7			403.2	36.6
5	Renee	32.6	28.7	35.7	37.4	37.9	37.9	41.3	39.7	36.9	29.2	36.5			393.8	35.8
6	Jeremy	33.6	24.6	33.2	39.5	31.0			35.7 (Note: Alex returned the competition in episode 8, while Jeremy returned in episode 10.)	36.8	27.7				262.1	32.8
7	Nina	32.2	30.6	42.5	36.9	36.9	37.9	42.6	43.9	38.3	26.9				368.7	36.9
8	Don	39.1	22.6	40.8	42.6	39.0	35.3	36.9	40.1	32.3					328.7	36.5
9	Alexandra	36.7	28.8	37.0	34.7				34.5						171.7	34.3
10	Phil	30.9	24.7	41.5	42.4	34.1	27.0	30.3							230.9	33.0
11	Jiana	37.5	33.8	40.0	35.5	34.3	26.9								208.0	34.7
12	Kanani	31.9	28.8	37.7	45.6	33.9									177.9	35.6
13	Mike	30.4	34.5	33.1											98.0	32.7
14	Chlea	31.6	22.2												53.8	26.9
15	Chris S.	29.4													29.4	29.4
16	Bianca	29.2													29.2	29.2

Indicates the contestant won the competition.
Indicates the contestant had the highest score that week.
Indicates the contestant was in the bottom two that week.
Indicates the contestant was eliminated that week.

=== Photo shoot guide ===
- Episode 1 was split into two parts:
  - First part: Masquerade fashion show (casting)
  - Second part: Leather outfits (casting)
- Episode 2 photo shoot: Alternative weddings
- Episode 3 photo shoot: S&M fashion with Alessandra Ambrosio and Rob Evans
- Episode 4 photo shoot: Trailer park chic
- Episode 5 commercial: Questionable Body Spray gender role reversal
- Episode 6 photo shoot: Nail art beauty shots
- Episode 7 photo shoot: Splashing body paint
- Episode 8 photo shoot: Magical field couture
- Episode 10 photo shoot: Flawsome with Zendaya and Shaun Ross
- Episode 11 photo shoot: Animorphs with endangered animals
- Episode 12 photo shoot: Rice paddy couture
- Episode 13 photo shoot: Hanging upside-down with bats
- Episode 14 photo shoots: Guess campaign; Nylon magazine spreads
- Episode 15 photo shoot: Feral and wild in the jungle

=== Makeovers ===
- Chlea – Long wavy honey blonde weave
- Mike – Amber highlights
- Kanani – Pixie cut
- Jiana – Long bob cut and dyed darker
- Phil – Shoulder length wavy brown weave
- Alexandra – Dyed chocolate brown
- Don – Dyed blonde with lighter facial hair
- Nina – Layered shoulder length cut with bangs and dyed red
- Jeremy – Trimmed & lightened with highlights
- Renee – Straightened and dyed black
- Chris H. – Dyed ice blonde
- Cory – Shaved bald; later, eyebrows bleached
- Marvin – A fade
- Jourdan – Dyed honey blonde
