= Hindorff =

Hindorff is a surname. Notable people with the surname include:

- Cory Wade Hindorff (born 1990), American model, actor, singer, songwriter, and activist
- Martin Hindorff (1897–1969), Swedish sailor
- Silvia Hindorff (born 1961), German gymnast
