= Bryanboy =

Swedish fashion blogger and socialite

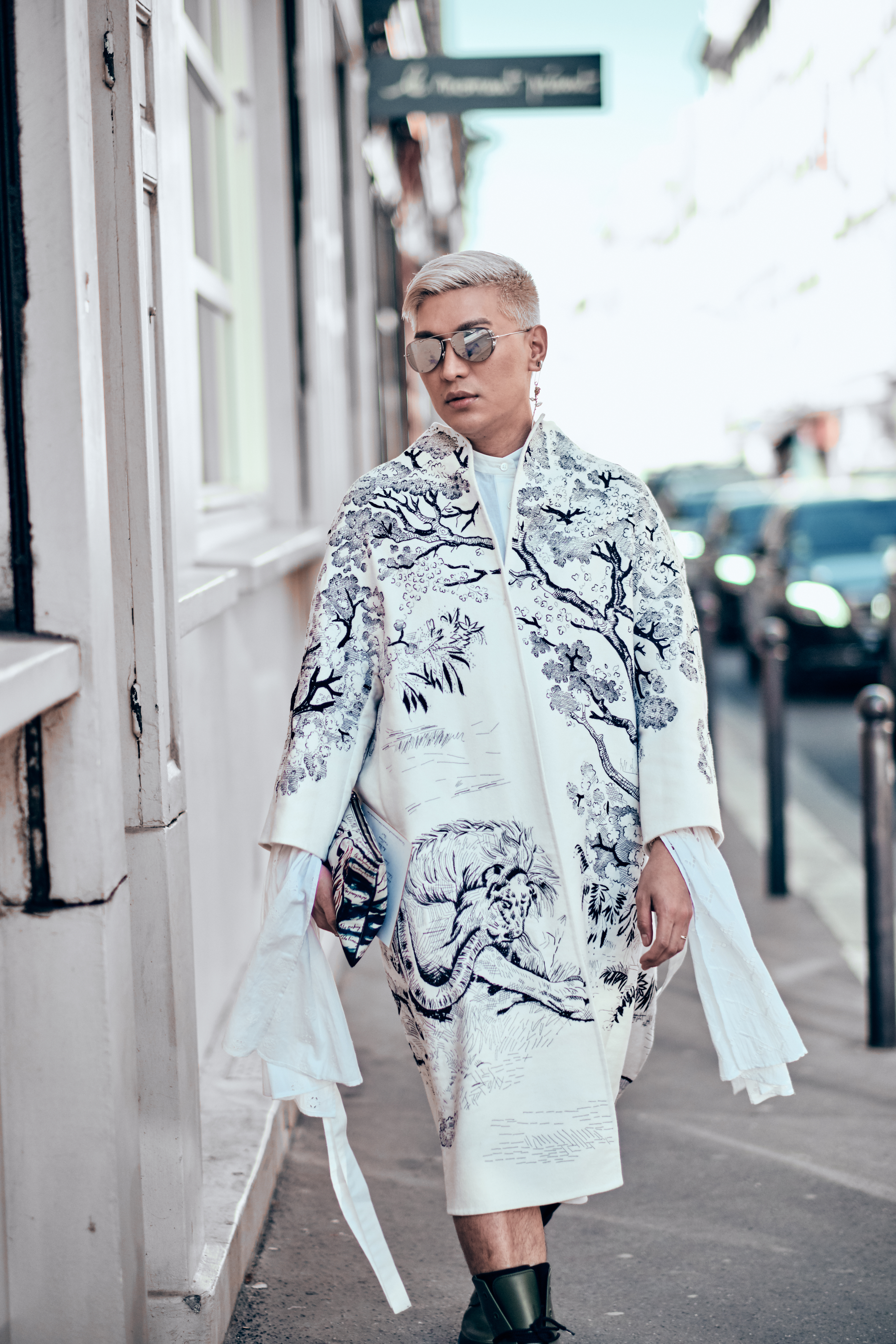
- Born: Bryan Grey Yambao
- Citizenship: Swedish (through marriage)
- Occupations: Fashion Editor and Social media personality
- Employer: Perfect Magazine
- Title: Editor-in-Chief

TikTok information
- Page: Bryanboy
- Followers: 4.0 million
- Last updated: 2 November 2022
- Website: http://bryanboy.com

Bryan Grey Yambao (21 March 1982), also known as Bryanboy, is a Filipino fashion blogger and socialite. A former web developer, he started blogging at age 24 from his parents' Manila home.

His eponymous blog won the 2007 Philippine Blog Award for Best Fashion & Lifestyle Blog. The New York Post named him one of the nine hottest internet celebrities, and news.com.au has called him "one of Fashion 2.0’s biggest superstars" and a "phenom in the fashion blogosphere". His blog, called "hysterically camp" by the Sydney Morning Herald, is known for its "witty and often bitchy commentary." He was featured as the social media correspondent on the panel of Cycle 19 & 20 of America's Next Top Model.

Bryanboy fans often send in photos of themselves in his signature pose—standing with hips thrust to one side and a handbag in an outstretched arm—or with handwritten signs declaring "I <3 Bryanboy"; celebrity participants have included Marc Jacobs, Tanya Dziahileva, Alexandra Agoston, and Rachel Clark. Though no brand spokesman commented on the matter, it was reported that Bryanboy's trademark pose was referenced in two 2006 Fendi advertisements. Marc Jacobs named a handbag after him (the BB ostrich bag) after Bryanboy posted about it in his blog.

== Career ==
In October 2020 at the height of the COVID-19 pandemic, Yambao grew an audience of 1 Million TikTok followers in a span of six months.

Yambao was featured on the December 2021-January 2022 cover of Mega Magazine Philippines.

On September 21, 2022, Yambao was appointed as Editor-in-Chief of London-based fashion bi-annual, Perfect Magazine.

== Filmography ==
=== Television ===
Year	Title	Role	Notes
2012	America's Next Top Model (season 19)	Social Media Correspondent	13 Episodes
2013	America's Next Top Model (season 20)	Social Media Correspondent	15 Episodes
