= Bali Safari and Marine Park =

Taman Safari Bali
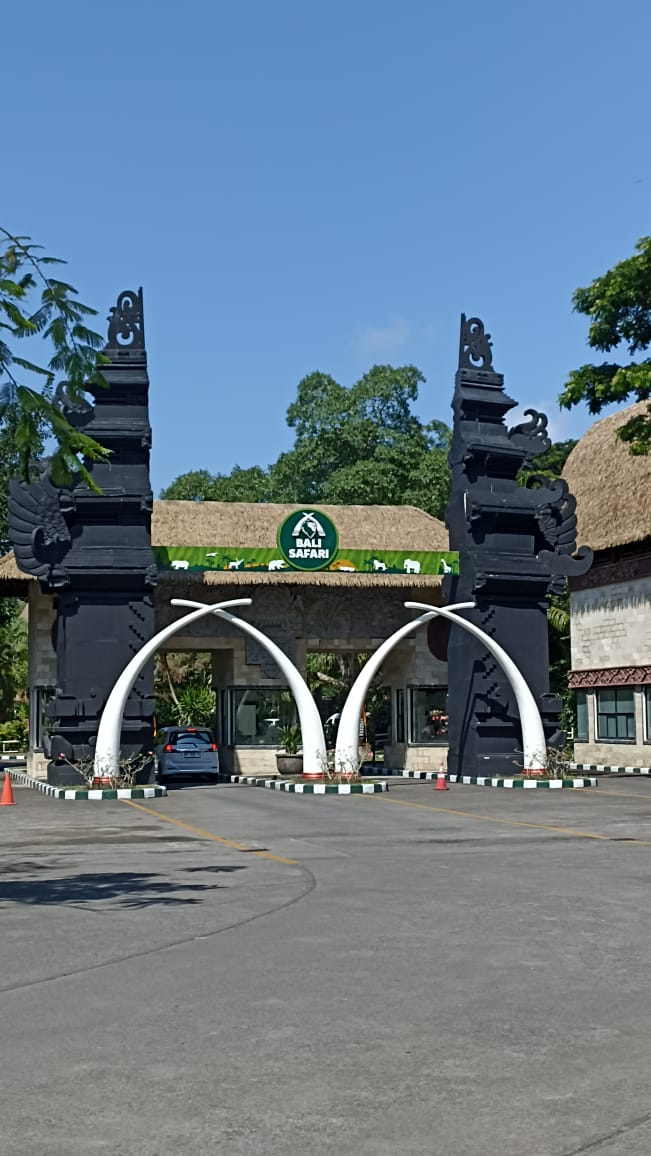
- Gate of Taman Safari Bali
- Interactive map of Taman Safari Bali
- 8.5810°S 115.3441°E
- Slogan: Escape into paradise
- Date opened: November 13, 2007
- Location: Gianyar, Bali, Indonesia
- Land area: 40 hectares (99 acres)
- No. of animals: >1000
- No. of species: >100
- Memberships: WAZA, SEAZA, CPSG, and PKBSI
- Website: www.balisafarimarinepark.com

Bali Safari & Marine Park, or Taman Safari Bali is a branch of Taman Safari located in Gianyar, Bali. It is managed by the Taman Safari Group which also manages Taman Safari Indonesia 1 in Cisarua, Bogor, West Java and Taman Safari Indonesia 2 in Prigen, East Java. All three Safari Parks including Taman Safari Bali are a conservation organization and a member of the Association of Indonesian Zoos. .

== Geographical Location ==
Taman Safari Bali with an area of ± 40 ha, is located in an area that includes the area of three villages, namely Medahan Village, Lebih Village, and Serongga Village, all in Gianyar Regency, Bali. This location is around 17 km from Denpasar or about 30 km from Kuta.

== Facilities ==
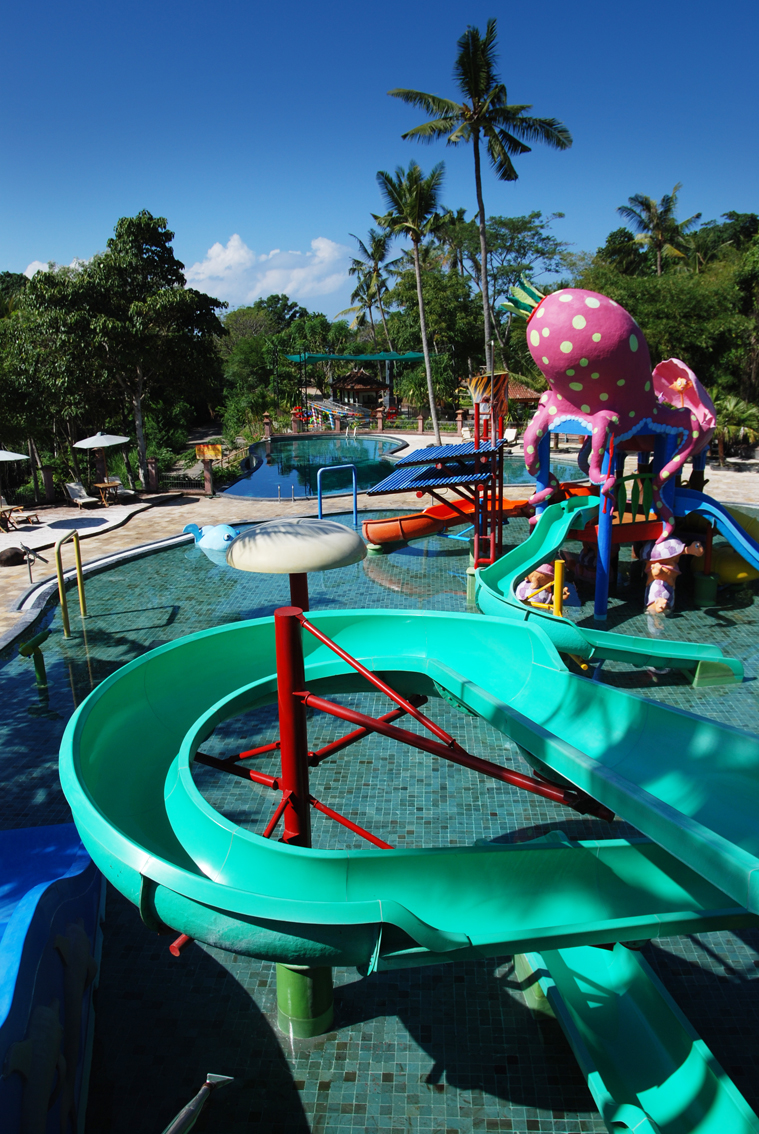
Water Park

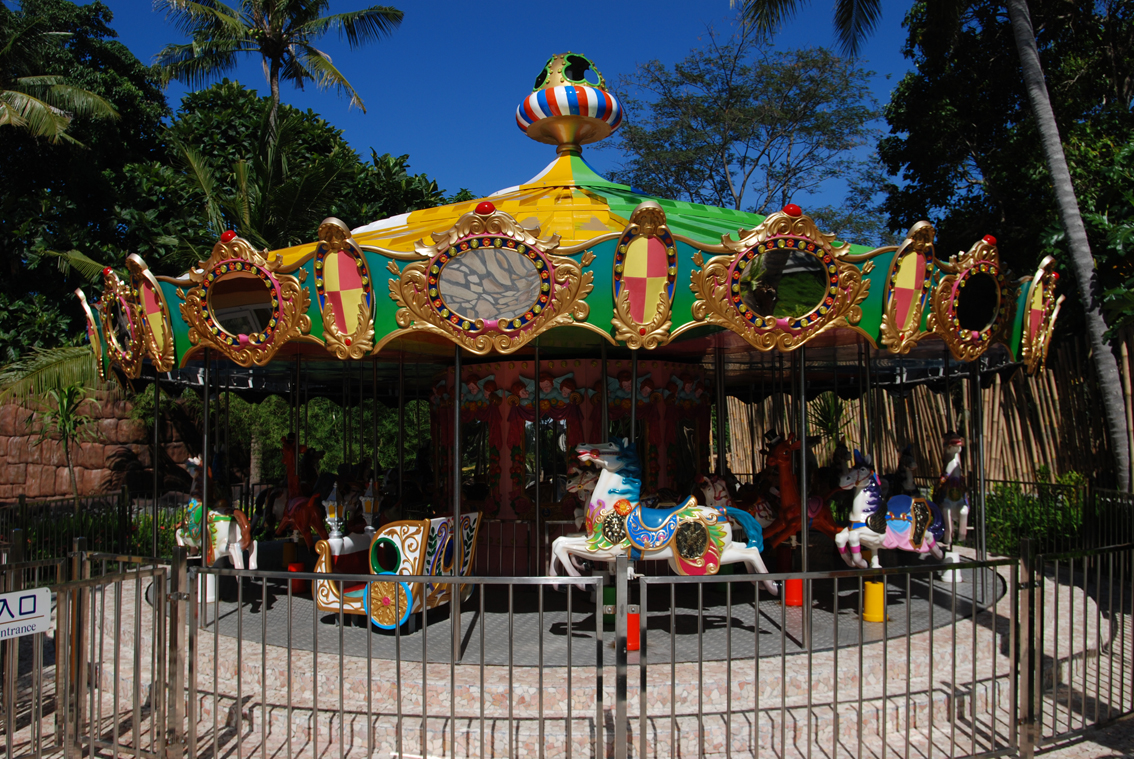
Fun Zone

Taman Safari Bali has many facilities, including:

- Animals in natural surroundings
- Recreation area
- Water play zone
- Fun Zone
- Cottages and bungalows
- Restaurants
- Rainforest Trail

The zoo provides bus tours for visitors to view some 1000 animals from 3 regions including Indonesia, India, and Africa.

== Ganesha Park ==
Ganesha Park is a park which has a 9-metre (30 ft) statue of the elephant-headed Hindu god Ganesha. This serves as the entrance to the Bali Theatre, which features Balinese Art. Foreign tourist can enjoy elephants bathing in this place.

== Pura Safari ==
Pura Safari is a temple (pura) located in the zoo, where people of Hindu Dharma and Hindu religion worship.

== Price and facilities ==
As of 2023, the domestic ticket price for the cheapest package, the Safari Explorer, is Rp. 175,000 per adult and Rp. 135,000 per child (3-12 years), and the price for foreign tourists starts from Rp. 650,000. The price includes Education and Conservation Programs such as various Animal Presentations, Safari Journey, Fun Zone and Water Play Zone, Feed the Predator, Jeep 4x4, Bali Theatre, Uma and Tsavo Lion Restaurant, and Night Safari. In addition to the facilities listed above, Bali Safari park has a hotel in the park, namely the Mara River Safari Lodge, an African themed hotel.

== Photo gallery ==
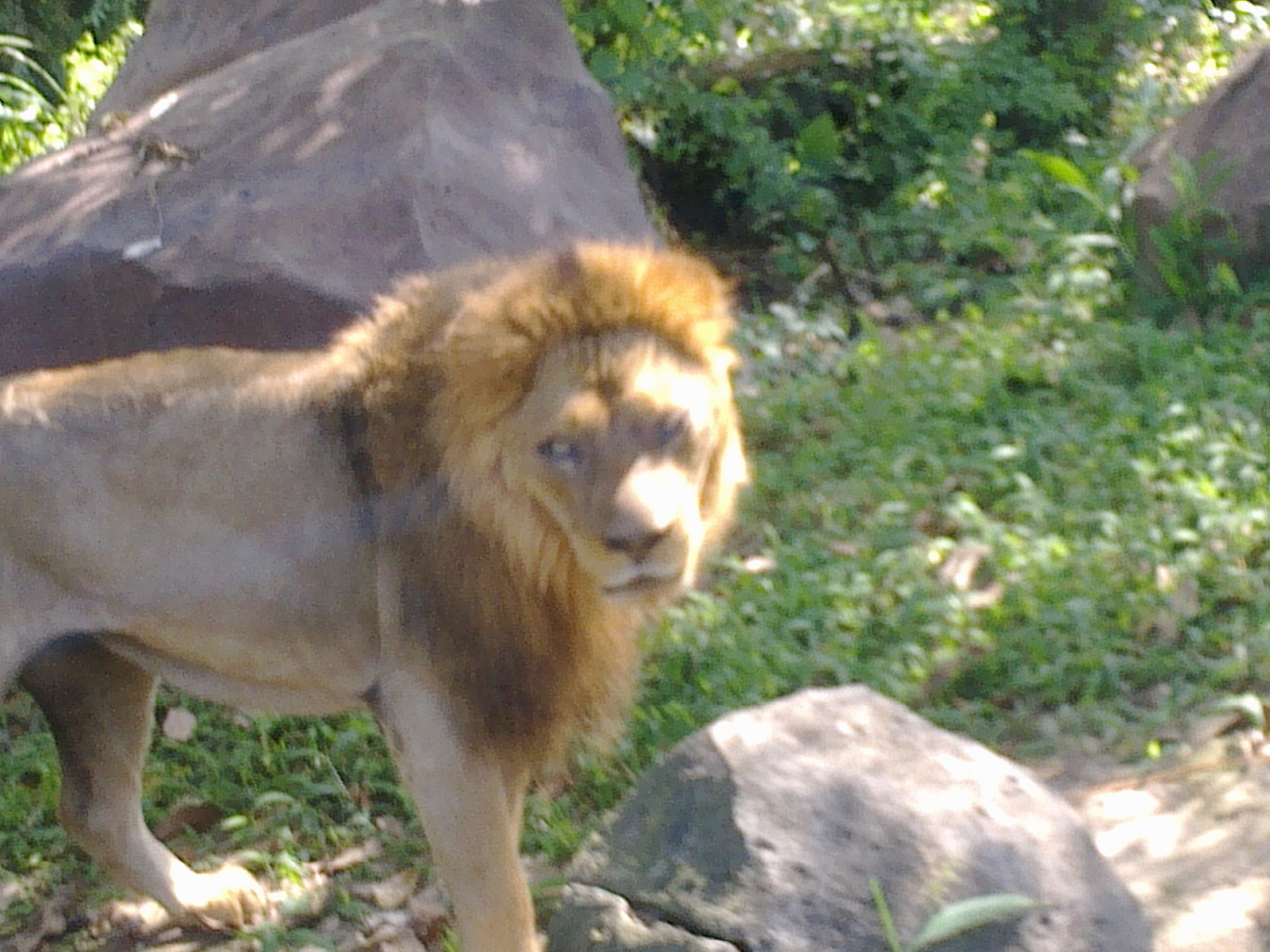

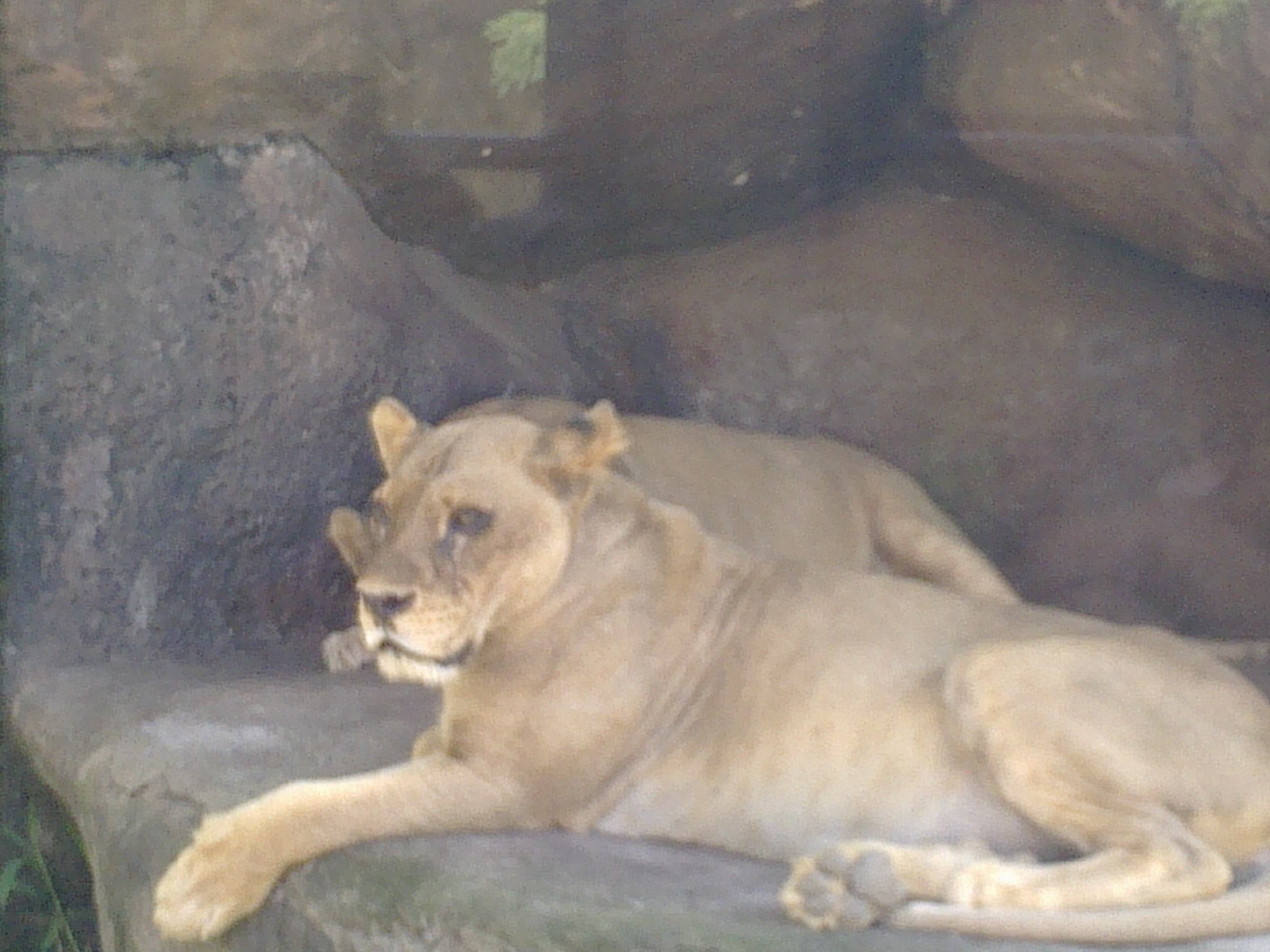

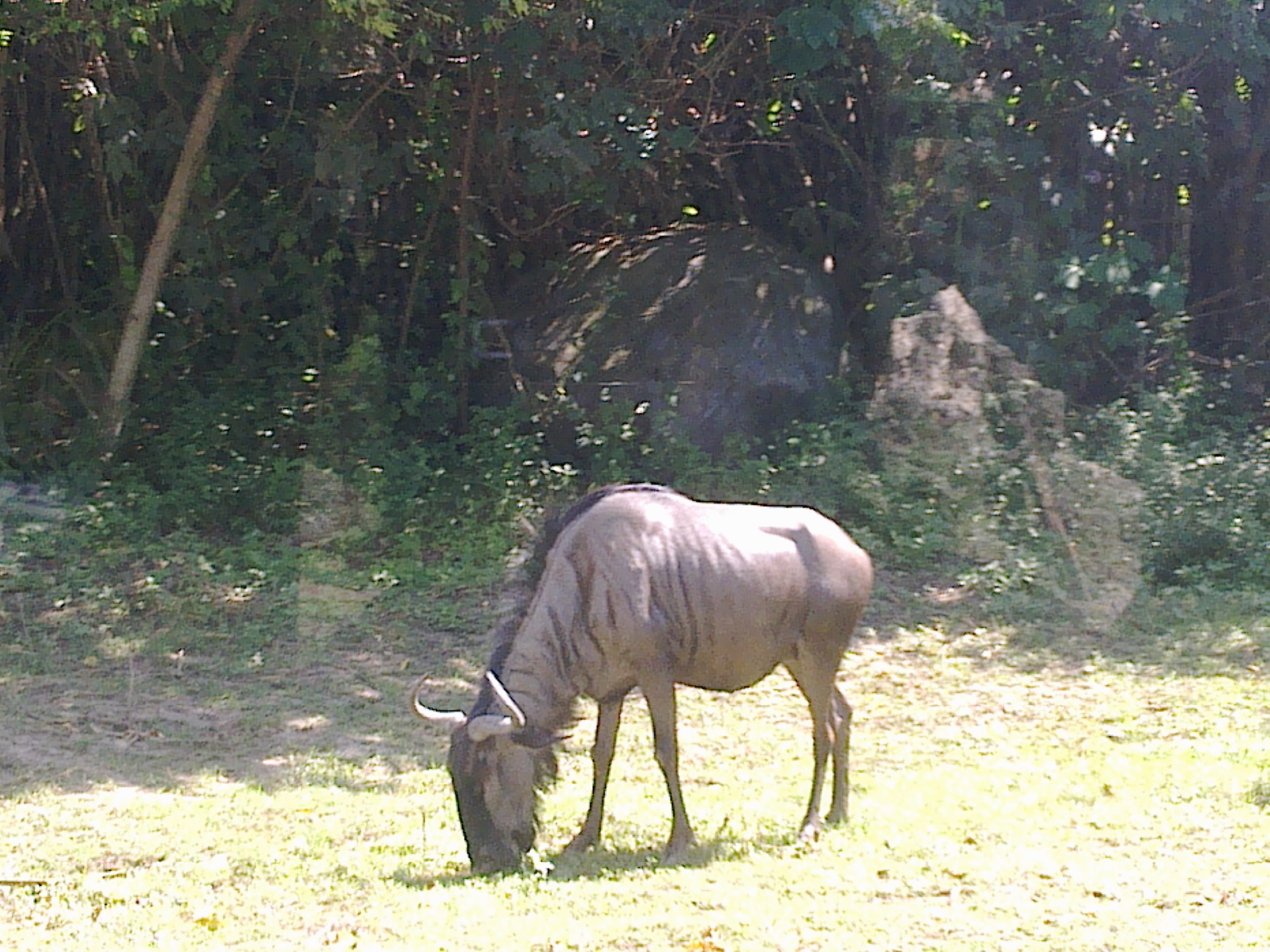

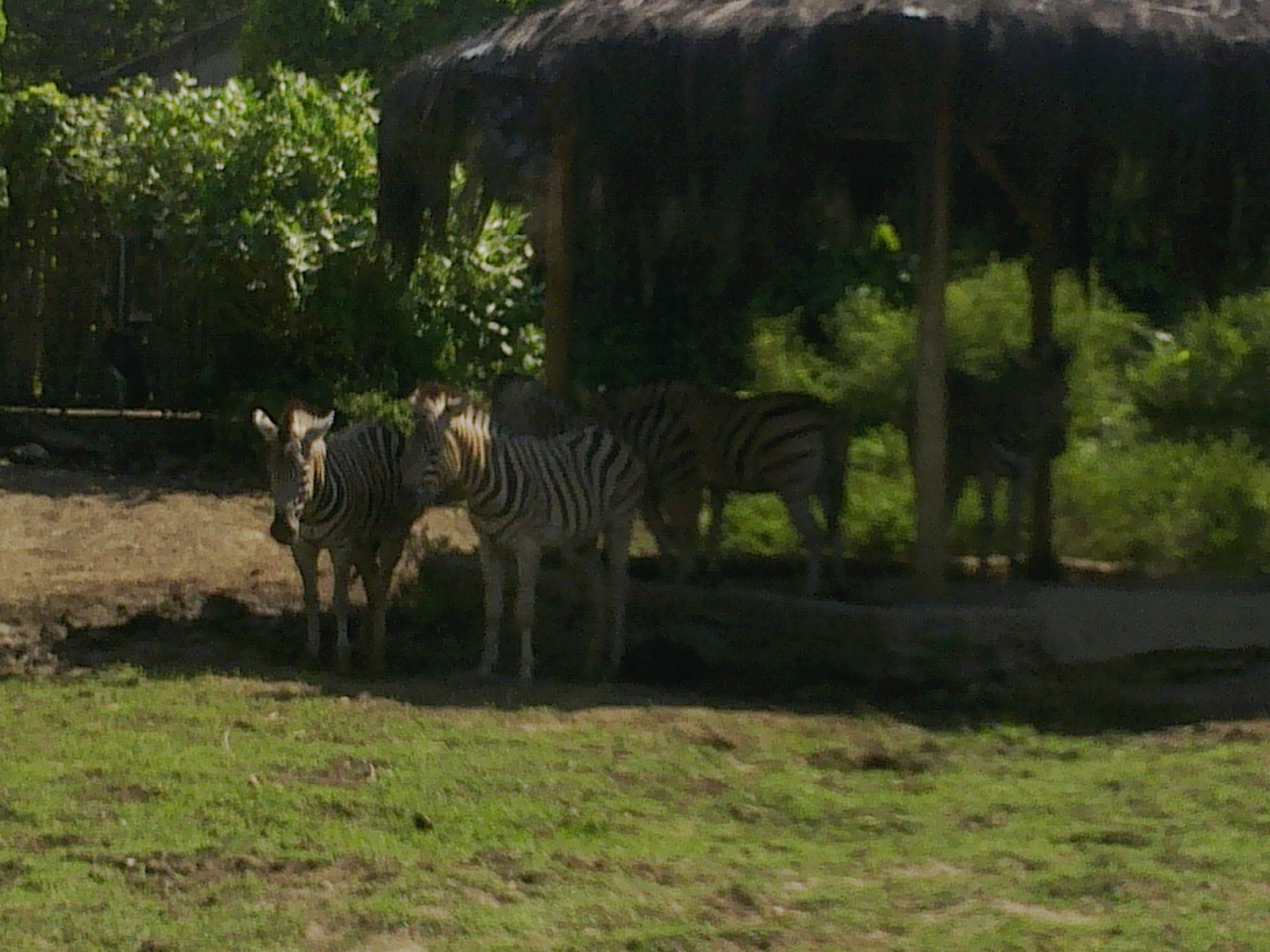

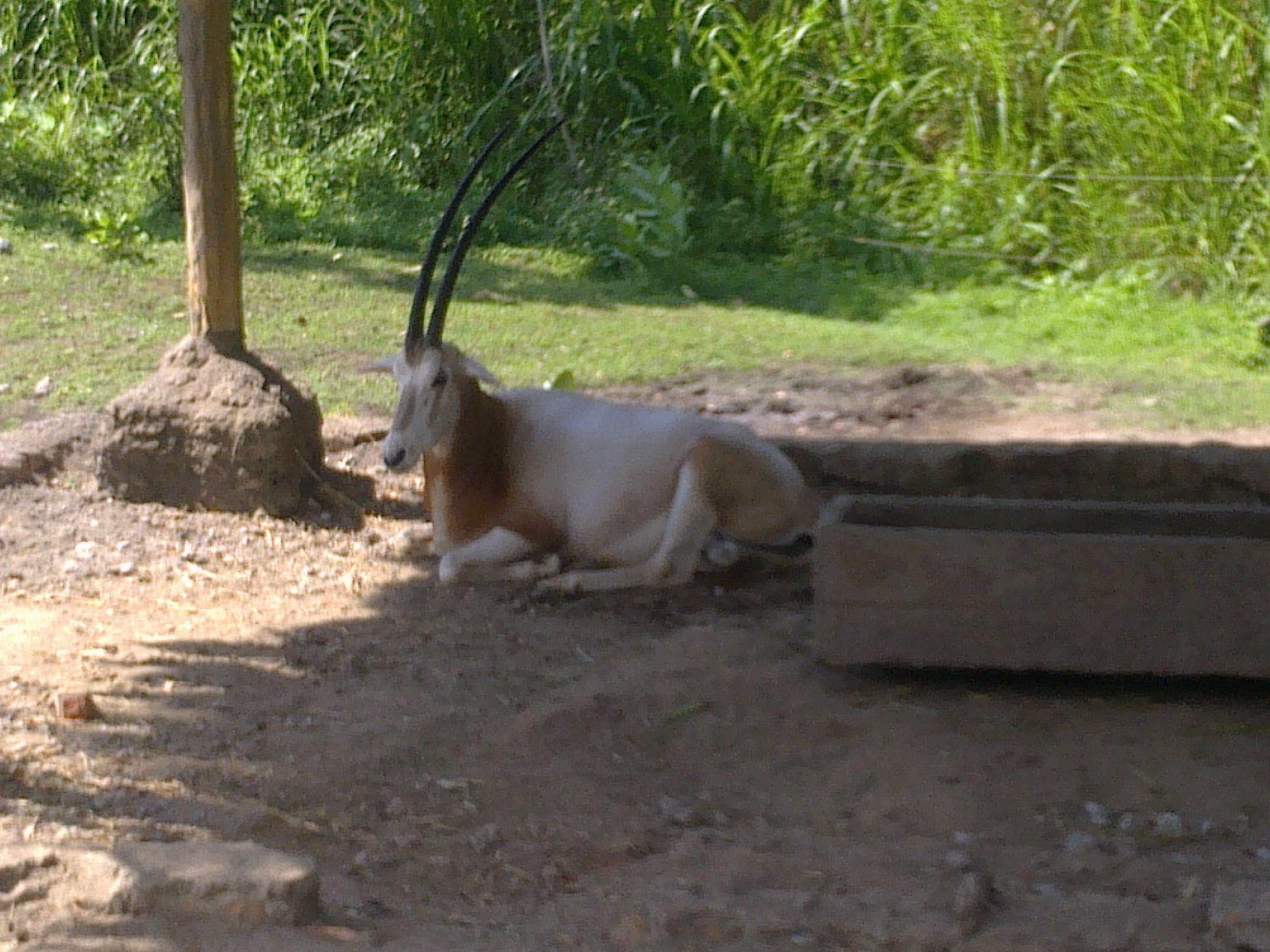

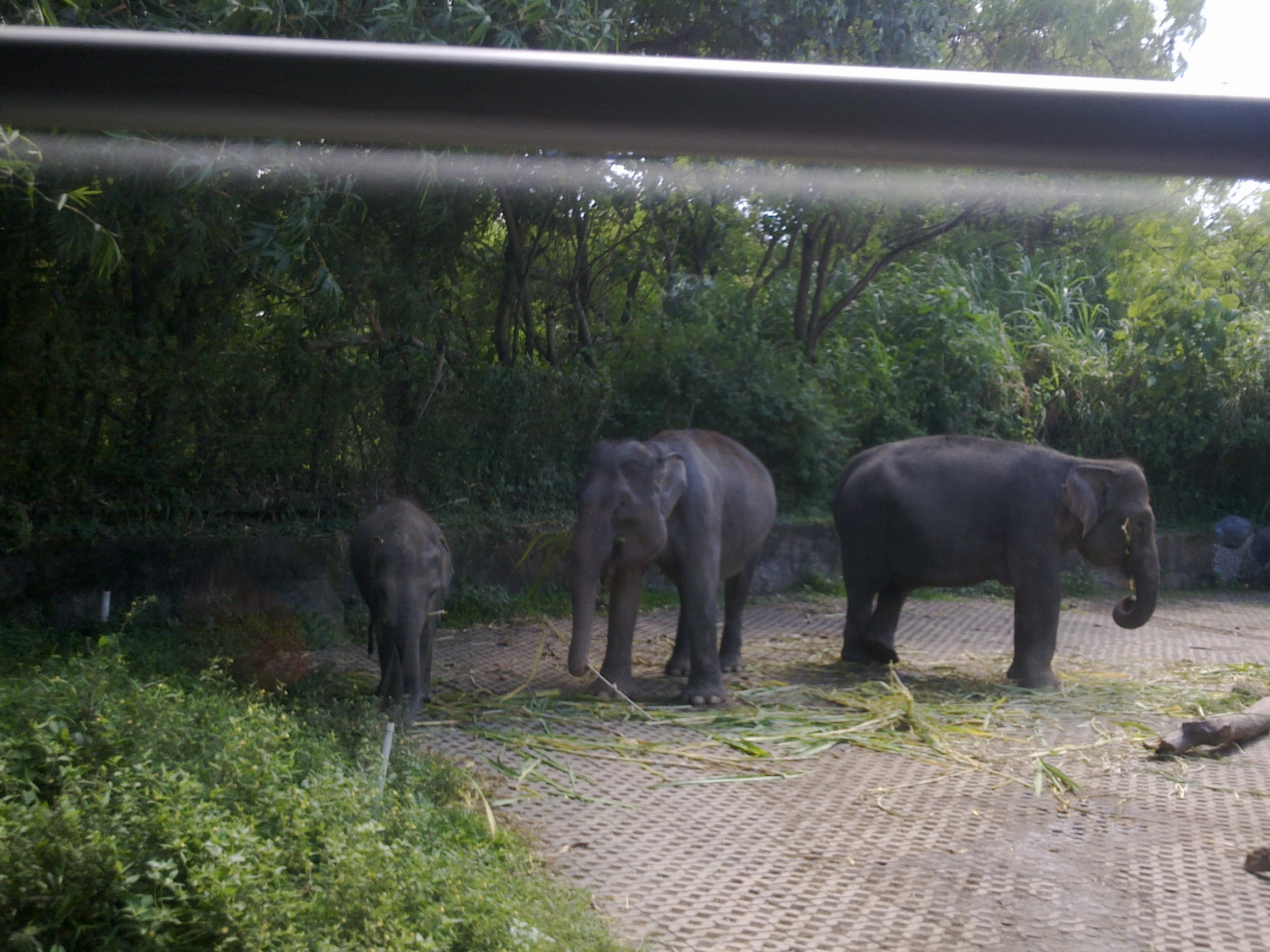

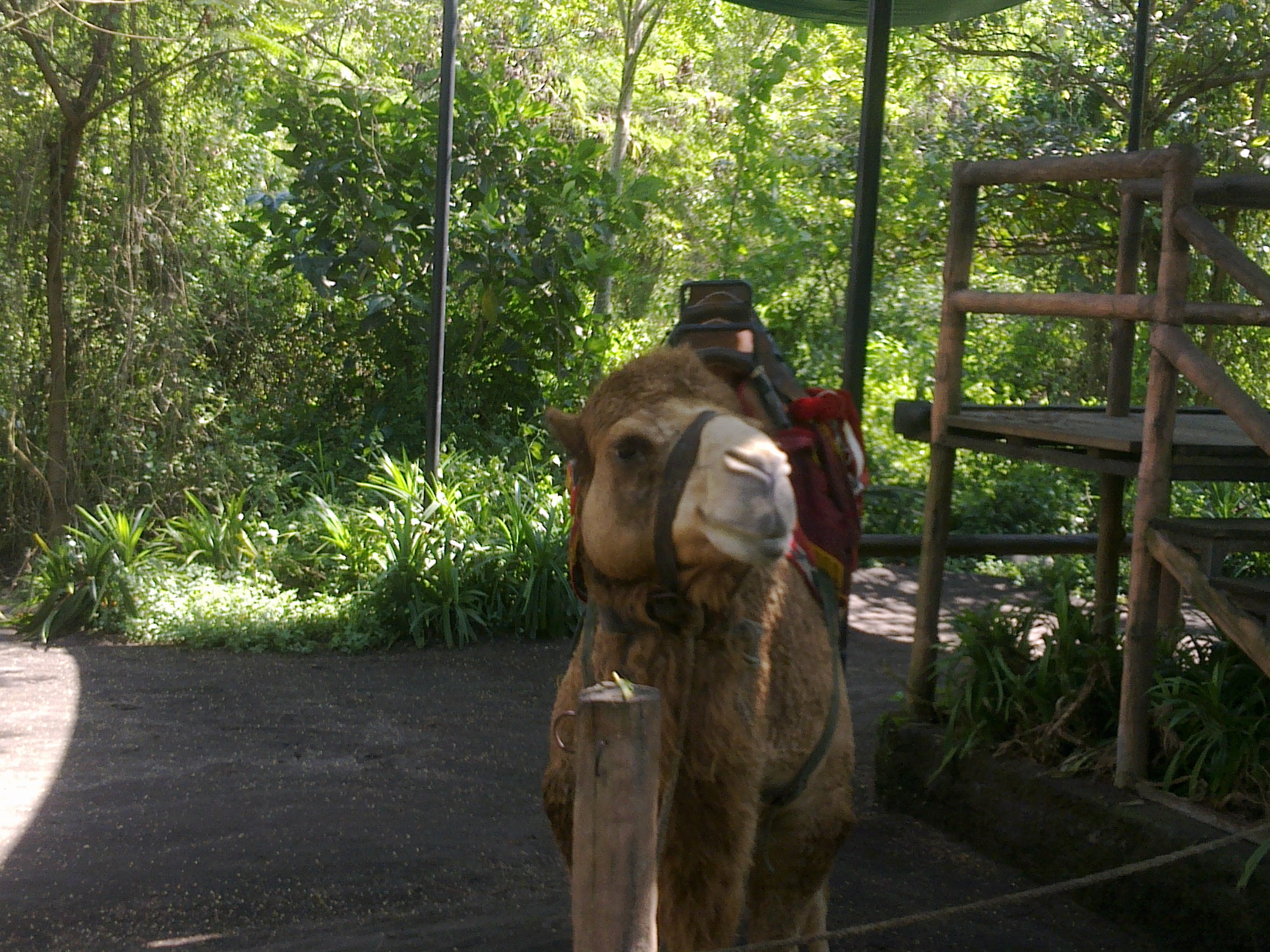

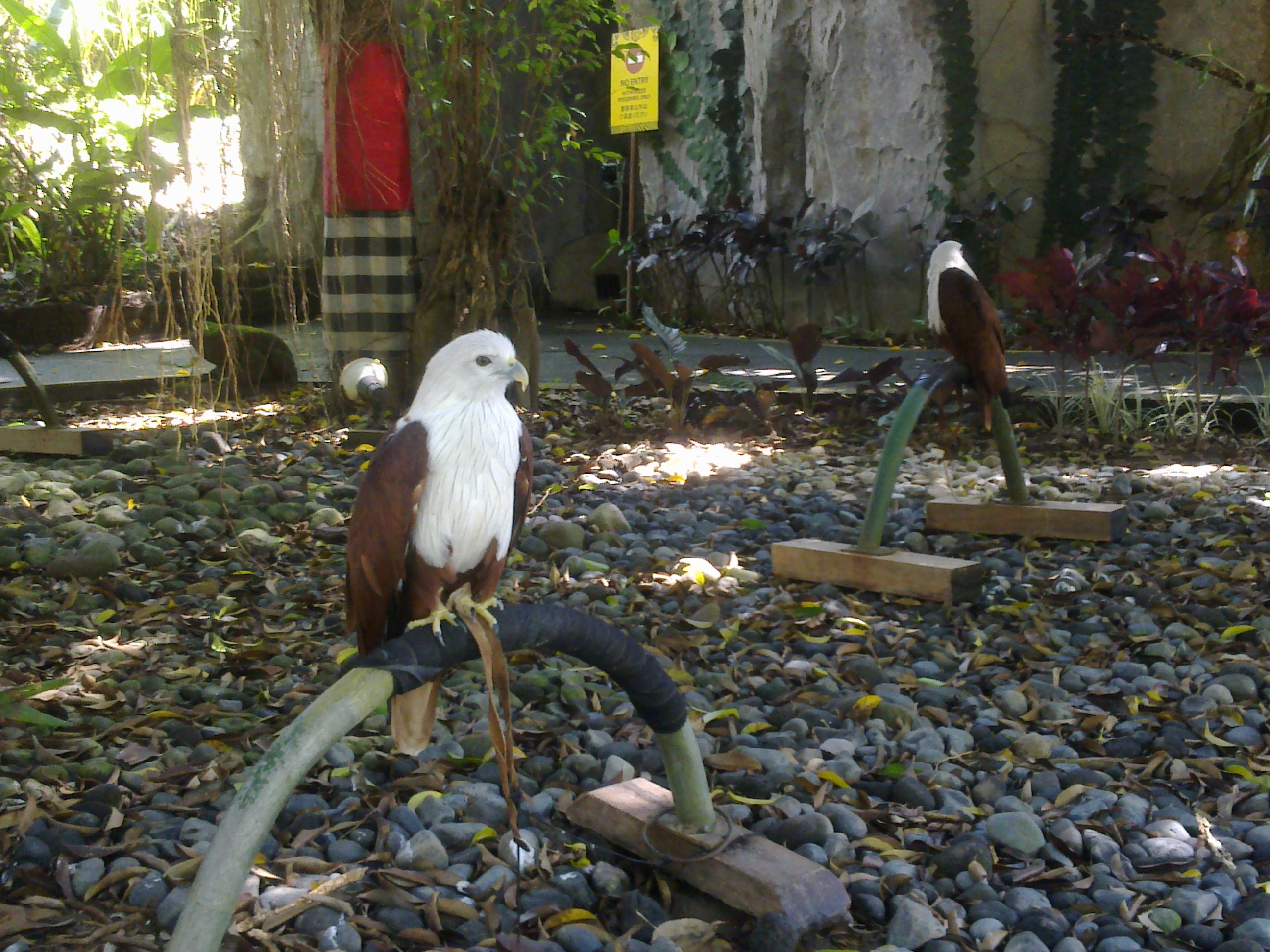

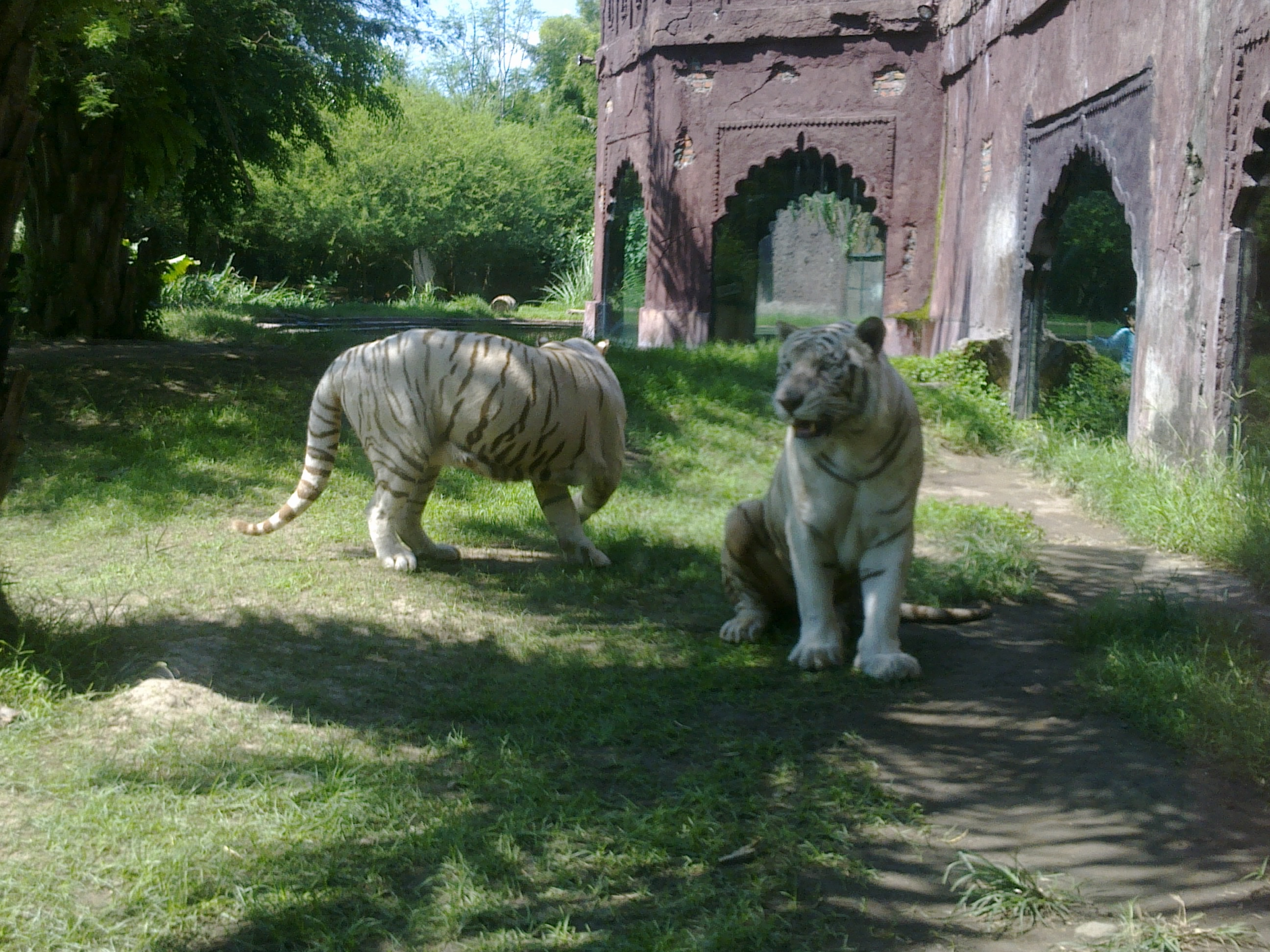

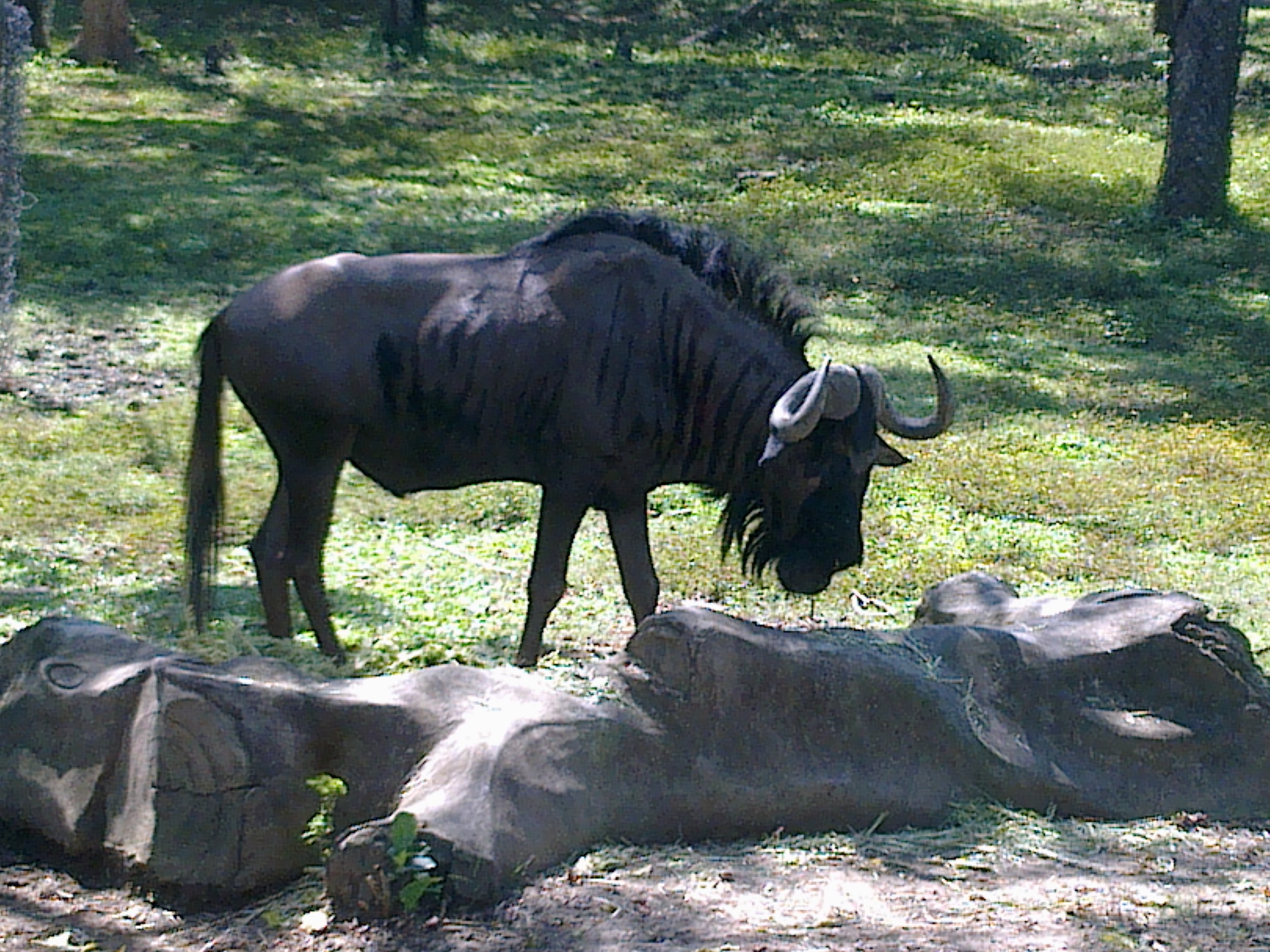

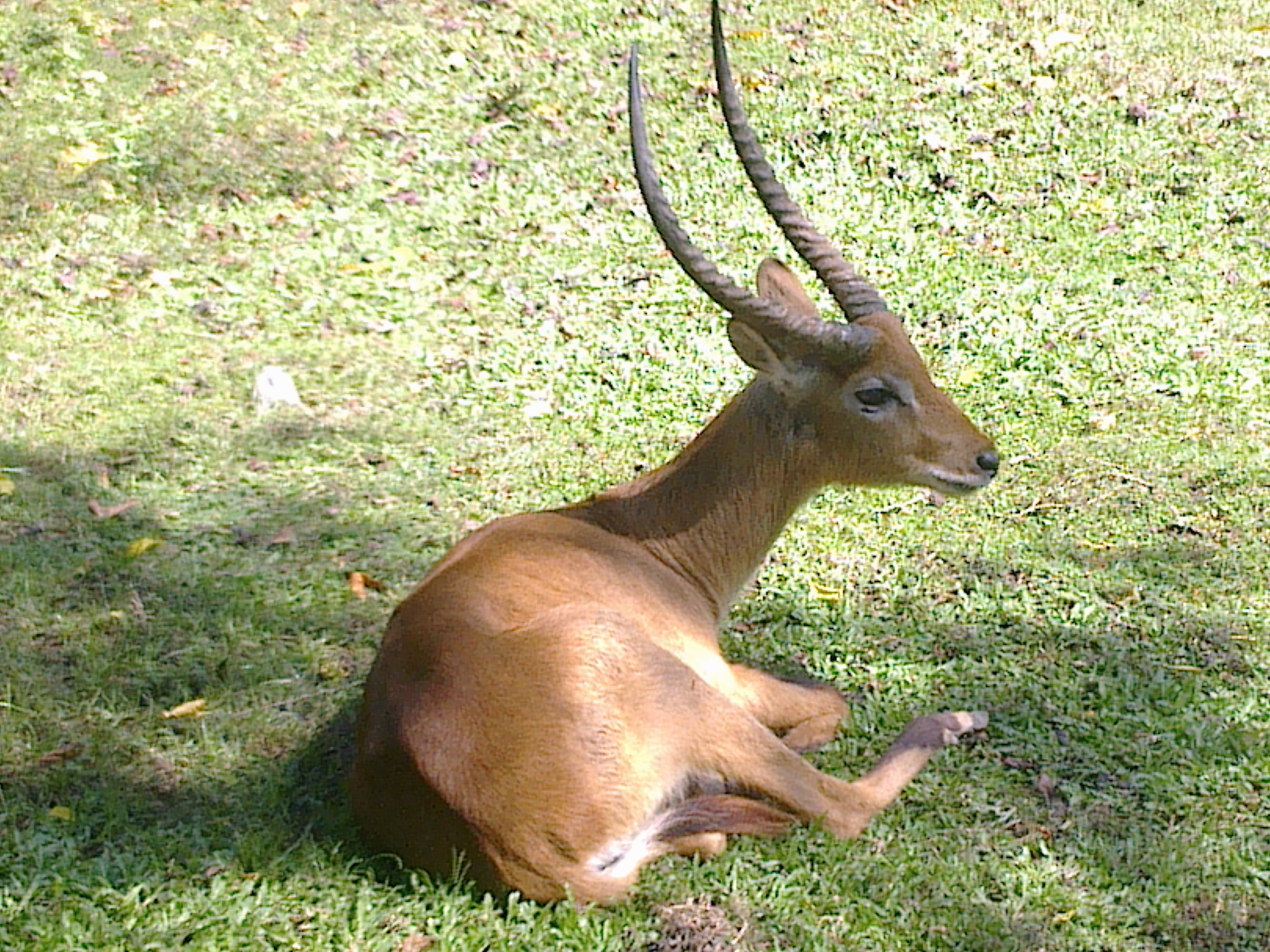

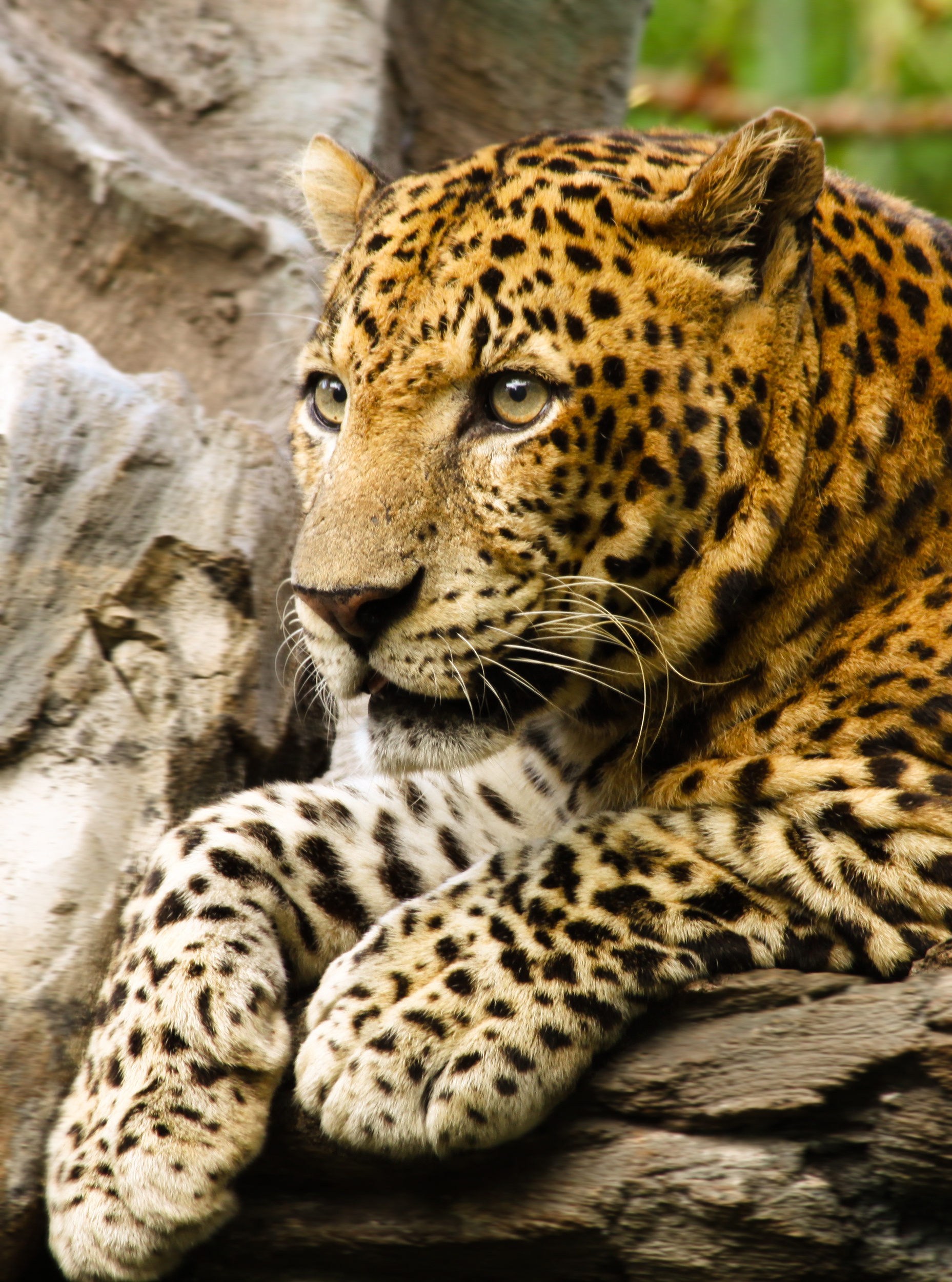
