= Udo Spreitzenbarth =

Barsaat Mein hone wale Rog

- Born: Pforzheim, Germany
- Occupation: Photographer
- Title: Photographer
- Website: www.udophotography.com

Udo Spreitzenbarth is a fashion and art photographer, residing in New York City. He was born in Germany and studied architecture at the Technical University Darmstadt, Germany. In 1993 he moved to New York and began his career as a fashion photographer. His work has been published in fashion magazines, and was presented at exhibitions worldwide. He also appeared as a featured photographer on America's Next Top Model in a 2013 episode titled “The Guy Who Cries”.

== Awards and exhibitions ==
Beasts of Burden - Solo exhibition

- 2006 Berlin
- 2007 Cologne
- 2007 Frankfurt

8 Spirits

- 2008 Shanghai
- 2010 Shanghai Tangram Art center

Tyra 15 Exhibition

- 2013 New York City

Miami Fashion Film Festival

- 2014 Six of his fashion films got into the official selection, featuring Tyra Banks, Jenna Dewan and more
- 2017 250 Jahre Goldstadt - Object of desire

== Magazine publications and covers ==
Cosmopolitan (Russia, South Africa, Mongolia, Portugal, Thailand, Estonia, En Epsilon, Mongolia), Elle (Germany, Canada, South Africa, Argentina), Marie Claire (Germany, South Africa), Newsweek, Westeast, Zink, Oyster, Gala, Men's Health, Maxim, Photographie, FAULT, Resource, TRAFFIC, Resident

== Corporate clients ==
Udo Spreitzanbarth has done advertising photography for DKNY Jeans, Maybelline, Ford, Nissan, Jim Beam, Jose Cuervo, Bretz Furniture Couture, FTC (Fair Trade Cashmere), Fubu, Coogi, Avirex, Mavi Jeans, Camus Cognac, Weatherproof, Free Country, Legale Hosiery, Marlboro, Gellner Jewelry, Eric Gaskins Couture

== Celebrity clients ==
Daymond John, John Legend, Usher, Tyra Banks, Helmut Newton, Meg Ryan, Salma Hayek, Lauren Hutton, Cindy Crawford, Jenna Dewan-Tatum, Diane Kruger, Leelee Sobieski, Gabe Saporta, Jessalyn Gilsig, Mary J. Blige, Angie Stone, Yao Ming, Molly Sims, Camila Alves, Olga Kurylenko, Monica, Mischa Barton, Tyrese, Wycleff Jean, Lisa Edelstein, Bai Ling, Shaggy, Vanessa Carlton, Ginuwine, Tricia Helfer, Selia Ebanks, Deborah Cox, Laura Vandervoort, Wynter Gordon, The Jonas Brothers, The Beach Boys, Daniel Brühl, Ryan Serhant
