= Cory Wade Hindorff =

American singer, actor, model, and spokesperson

- Born: September 21, 1990 (age 35); Philadelphia, Pennsylvania, U.S.
- Modeling information
- Height: 6 ft 2 in (188 cm)
- Hair color: Brown
- Eye color: Blue
- Agency: EMG Models
- Website: corywadeofficial.com

Cory Wade Hindorff (born September 21, 1990) is an American model, actor, singer, songwriter and LGBTQ activist and spokesperson. He is best known for being the last eliminated on the 20th cycle of America's Next Top Model, and being the first openly gay male participant in the show.

== Early life ==
Cory is the third of four brothers, born in Philadelphia, Pennsylvania, on September 21, 1990. He attended Strath Haven High School there, and later studied musical theater at Point Park University. He focused his early career on live theater, and performed as Angel in Rent at a local equity house in the suburbs of Philadelphia, and Paul in A Chorus Line in another professional production.

== Career ==
=== ANTM ===
Hindorff was selected to participate in the 20th cycle of America's Next Top Model in 2013. The season was unique because it was the first time Tyra Banks allowed contestant in all gender to compete against each for the first place. Throughout the show, Hindorff was forced to mature his inner-self to stand against the criticism of fellow male contestantsand especially judge Rob for being too "feminine" and having a lack of masculine poses for the photoshoots

He described it in an interview: "I went through an identity crisis that almost completely destroyed me when I was on that show. All of that said, my experience on Top Model was incredible and life changing. It was a very positive thing. I just wish I could've desensitized myself to all of the pressure I was receiving to 'man up' or to 'act straight.'"

Tyra Banks also helped Hindorff get through some tough times during the show: "She told me that what I had to offer was polarizing...and that I should use that to my advantage. That advice has served me very well! She was also the one who recommended that I get into event hosting and red carpet hosting! I've made most of the money I've earned in 2015 through hosting at events and on red carpets so she definitely knew what she was talking about! I love her endlessly."

After his run on the 20th cycle of ANTM he returned for three cameos on the next season.

=== After ANTM ===
He went on to do several modeling jobs, is currently signed with EMG models in New York City, and gives talks on gender expression and sexuality at various colleges and universities across America through "The College Agency".

=== Music career ===
In February 2015, he released his first single "I'm Sorry" and followed it with "Carpe Diem" on July that same year. During a trip to London on 2017, he got acquaintanced with pop producer Alan Glass, who produced his first album "Unify" with its first single and music video "There For You", debuted on June 26, 2017. Unify was released in September 2017 via Spotify. On October 23, 2020, alongside Reenna, he released "Dreaming on the Dance Floor".

== Activism ==
He is a strong supporter of LGBTQ equality and especially gender-fluid and non-binary clothing choices for queer people. He has been published in the Huffington Post, BuzzFeed, People and others in various articles about gender non-conformity as well as general queer culture in today's society. He advocates for The Door NYC, Adoptions From The Heart, Attic Youth Center and Sound Affects charities and non-profit organizations.

== Personal life ==
According to interviews, he loves to sing, act, model and being a drag queen. Cory is non-binary and uses he/him, she/her, and they/them pronouns Cory resides in New York City.
