= Alexandra Agoston =

Australian fashion model

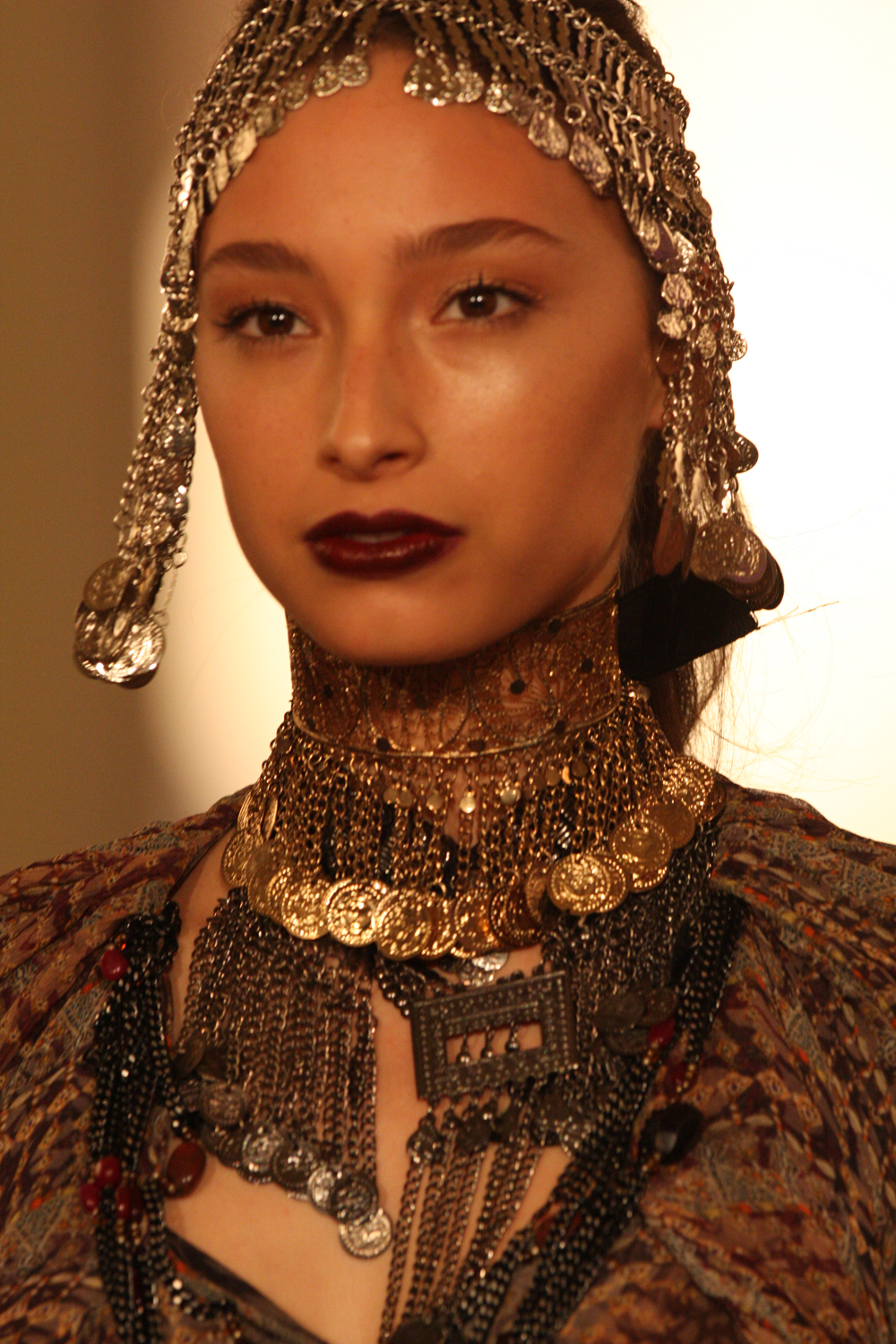
- Agoston in 2012
- Born: Alexandra Agoston-O'Connor; 24 June 1987 (age 39); Sydney, Australia
- Occupation: Fashion model
- Modeling information
- Height: 6 ft 0 in (183 cm)
- Hair color: Brown
- Eye color: Brown
- Agency: DNA Models; Viva; Priscillas

Alexandra Agoston-O'Connor (born 24 June 1987) is an Australian fashion model.

== Career ==
Agoston is of Hungarian, Irish, English, and Austrian descent. She was discovered in Paris while on holiday with her family.

Her first modelling jobs were for Proenza Schouler, Monique Lhuillier, Christian Lacroix, Elie Saab, Armani Privé, Dior, Comme des Garçons and Jean-Paul Gaultier. She has also walked for Naeem Khan, Badgley Mischka, John Galliano, Off-White, Christian Siriano and David Jones.

She is considered to be Gaultier's muse.

Agoston has been the face of Kookai.

== Personal life ==
Agoston is in a relationship and has two children with photographer Chris Colls.
